= List of rivers of the Philippines =

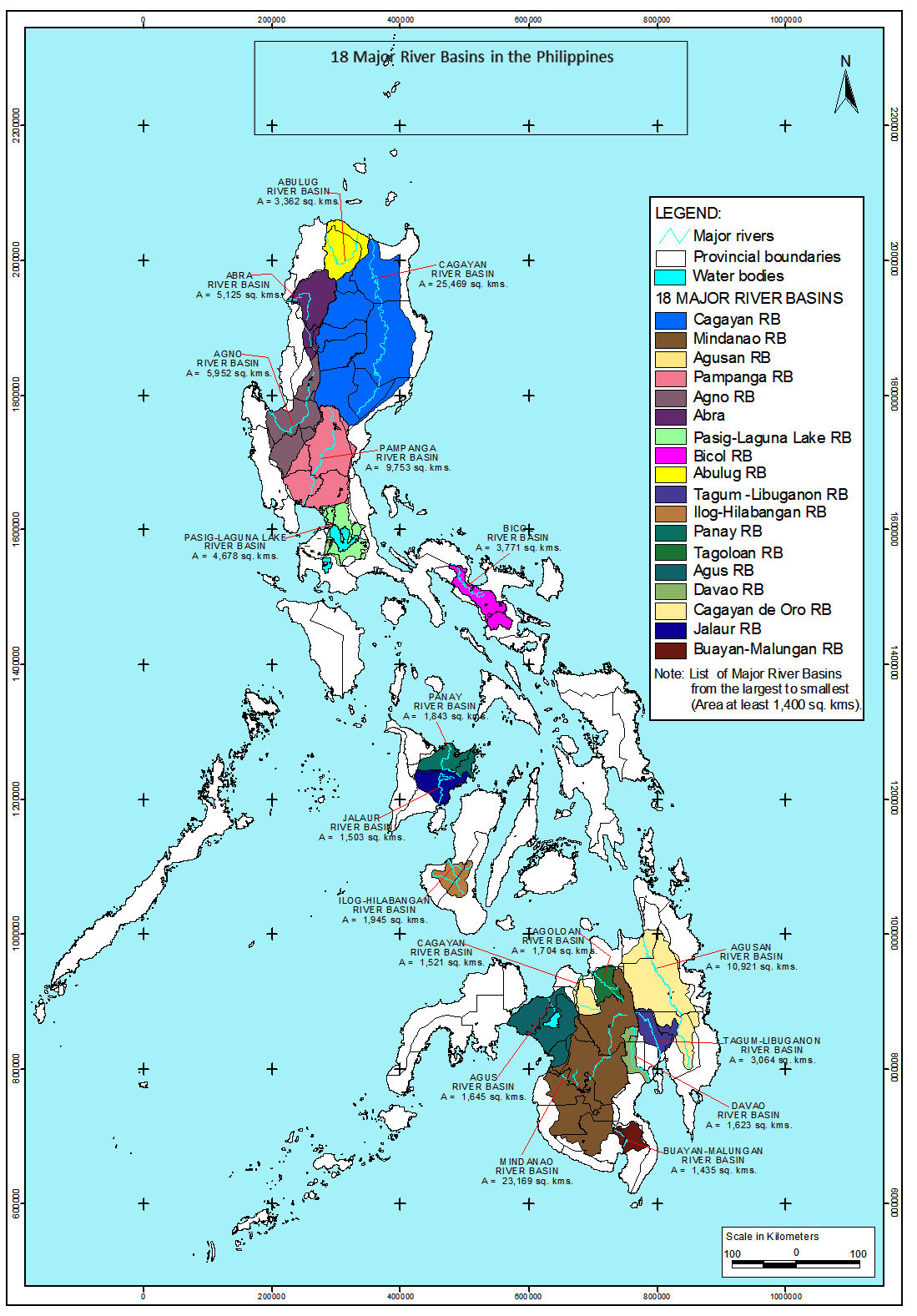
18 Major River Basins in the Philippines

Rivers in the Philippines are grouped into 18 major river basins. Of these, the Cagayan, the country's longest river, has the largest drainage basin, followed by the Mindanao, the Agusan, and the Pampanga.

== Luzon ==
- Abra River
- Abulog River
- Agno River
- Angat River
- Bacoor River
- Balili River
- Bay River
- Bicol River
  - Libmanan River
  - Mangayawan River
  - Naga River
  - Yabu River
- Bued River
- Bunggo River
- Cabuyao River
- Cagayan River
  - Baligatan River
  - Calao River
  - Chico River
  - Diadi River
  - Ilagan River
  - Magat River
    - Santa Fe River
  - Mallig River
  - Pinacanauan River
  - Siffu River
- Calumpang River (Batangas)
- Ifugao River
- Labo River
- Lawaye River
- Lobo River
- Mangangate River
- Marikina River (Metro Manila)
- Maygñaway River (on Catanduanes)
- Morong River
- Meycauayan River
- Navotas River
- Padsan River
  - Guisit River
- Pagsanjan River (Laguna)
- Pampanga River
- Pangil River (Laguna)
- Pansipit River
- Parañaque River
- Pasig River (Metro Manila)
  - San Juan River
  - Taguig River (Metro Manila)
- San Juan River
- San Cristobal River (Laguna)
- Santa Cruz River
- Santo Tomas River (Zambales)
- Sapang Baho River
- Siniloan River
- Tarlac River
- Tullahan River
- Tunasan River
- Umiray River
- Yawa River
- Zapote River

== Visayas ==
- Abatan River, Bohol
- Aklan River, Panay
- Anilao River, Leyte
- Banica River, Negros Island
- Batiano River, Panay
- Bojo River, Cebu
- Butuanon River, Cebu
- Catarman River, Northern Samar
- Catubig River, Northern Samar
- Hilabangan River
- Iloilo River, Panay
- Inabanga River, Bohol
- Jalaur River, Panay
- Kamputhaw River, Cebu
- Loboc River, Bohol
- Malbasag River, Leyte
- Matutinao River, Cebu
- Pambujan River, Northern Samar
- Panay River, Panay
- Silmugi River, Cebu
- Subangdaku River, Southern Leyte
- Ulot River, Samar

== Mindanao ==
- Agus River
- Agusan River
  - Sibagat River
  - Wawa River
  - Umayam River
- Buayan River
- Cagayan de Oro River
  - Bubunaoan River
  - Kalawaig River
  - Tagite River
- Davao River
  - Salug River
- Guagua River
- Malungon River
- Mandulog River (Iligan)
- Rio Grande de Mindanao
  - Libungan River
  - Pulangi River
    - Bobonawan River
    - Tigwa River
    - Manupali River
    - Muleta River
    - Sawaga River
  - Maradugao River
  - Kabacan River
  - Buluan River
  - Allah River
- Surigao River
- Tagum River
- Libuganon River
- Tagoloan River
  - Initao River (Initao, Misamis Oriental)
  - Talabaan River (Naawan, Misamis Oriental)
  - Manticao River (Manticao, Misamis Oriental)

== Longest rivers in the Philippines ==
Rank	River	Mouth	Length (km)	Length (mi)	Source	Provinces
1	Cagayan River	Philippine Sea	505	314	Caraballo Mountains	Cagayan, Isabela, Nueva Vizcaya, Quirino
2	Rio Grande de Mindanao	Illana Bay	373	232	Pulangi River	Cotabato City, Cotabato, Sultan Kudarat, Bukidnon, Lanao del Sur
3	Agusan River	Butuan Bay	349	217	Tagum	Agusan del Norte, Agusan del Sur, Davao de Oro
4	Pulangi River	Illana Bay	320	199	Mangabon Range	Bukidnon
5	Pampanga River	Manila Bay	261	162	Sierra Madre	Pampanga, Nueva Ecija, Aurora
6	Agno River	Lingayen Gulf	206	128	Cordillera Central Mountains	Pangasinan, Benguet
7	Ilagan River	Cagayan River	188	117	Sierra Madre	Isabela, Nueva Vizcaya, Aurora
8	Magat River	Cagayan River	183	114	Cordillera Central Mountains	Isabela, Ifugao, Nueva Vizcaya
9	Abra River	South China Sea	179	111	Mount Data	Ilocos Sur, Abra, Benguet
10	Abulog River	Philippine Sea	175	109	Kalinga	Cagayan, Apayao
11	Chico River	Cagayan River	175	109	Mount Data	Cagayan, Kalinga, Mountain Province, Benguet
12	Pambujan River	Philippine Sea	156	97	Calbayog	Northern Samar, Samar
13	Angat River	Manila Bay	153	95	Angat Dam	Bulacan
14	Panay River	Sibuyan Sea	151	94	Central Panay Mountain Range	Capiz, Iloilo
15	Davao River	Davao Gulf	150	93	Salug River	Davao City, Davao del Norte, Bukidnon
16	Jalaur River	Guimaras Strait	122	76	Central Panay Mountain Range	Iloilo
17	Amburayan River	South China Sea	97	60	Cordillera Central Mountains	Ilocos Sur, La Union, Benguet
17	Aklan River	Sibuyan Sea	97	60	Central Panay Mountain Range	Aklan, Capiz, Iloilo
19	Tarlac River	Agno River	95	59	Mount Pinatubo	Tarlac
20	Bicol River	San Miguel Bay	93	58	Lake Bato	Camarines Sur
21	Cagayan de Oro River	Macajalar Bay	90	56	Kalatungan Mountain Range	Misamis Oriental, Bukidnon, Lanao del Norte
21	Ulot River	Philippine Sea	90	56	San Jose de Buan	Samar, Eastern Samar
23	Bucayao Silonay River	Sibuyan Sea	82	51	Mindoro Mountain Range	Oriental Mindoro, Occidental Mindoro
24	Lumintao River	Mindoro Strait	80	50	Mindoro Mountain Range	Occidental Mindoro
25	Mambusao River	Panay River	77.30	48.03	Central Panay Mountain Range	Capiz
26	Marikina River	Pasig River	77	48	Sierra Madre	Metro Manila, Rizal
26	Bued River	South China Sea	77	48	Cordillera Central Mountains	Pangasinan, La Union, Benguet
28	Bongabong River	Sibuyan Sea	76	47	Mindoro Mountain Range	Oriental Mindoro,Occidental Mindoro
29	Sibalom River	Sulu Sea	74.5	46.3	Central Panay Mountain Range	Antique
30	Padsan River	South China Sea	72	45	Cordillera Central Mountains	Ilocos Norte
31	Tigum River	Guimaras Strait	71.5	44.4	Central Panay Mountain Range	Iloilo
32	Busuanga River	Mindoro Strait	70.0	43.5	Mindoro Mountain Range	Occidental Mindoro
