= San Cristobal River =

River in Laguna, Philippines

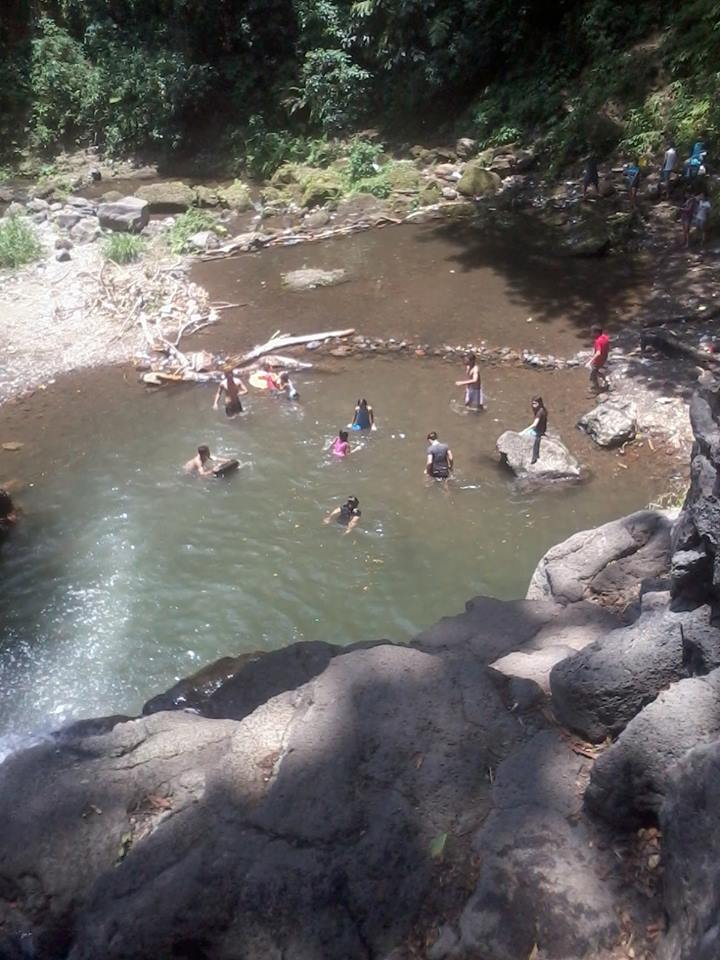
- San Cristobal River, the boundary shore of Calamba

- Location within Luzon Location within Philippines
- Native name: Matang Tubig River (Tagalog)

Location
- Country: Philippines
- Region: Calabarzon
- Province: Laguna
- Cities: Cabuyao; Calamba

Physical characteristics
- Mouth: Laguna de Bay
  - coordinates: 14°13′49″N 121°11′12″E
  - elevation: less than 2 meters (6.6 ft) above sea level

The San Cristobal River (Tagalog: Ilog ng San Cristobal), commonly known as the Matang Tubig River, is a river system in the cities of Calamba and Cabuyao, Laguna, Philippines. The river is one of 21 major tributaries of Laguna de Bay.

== Hydrology ==
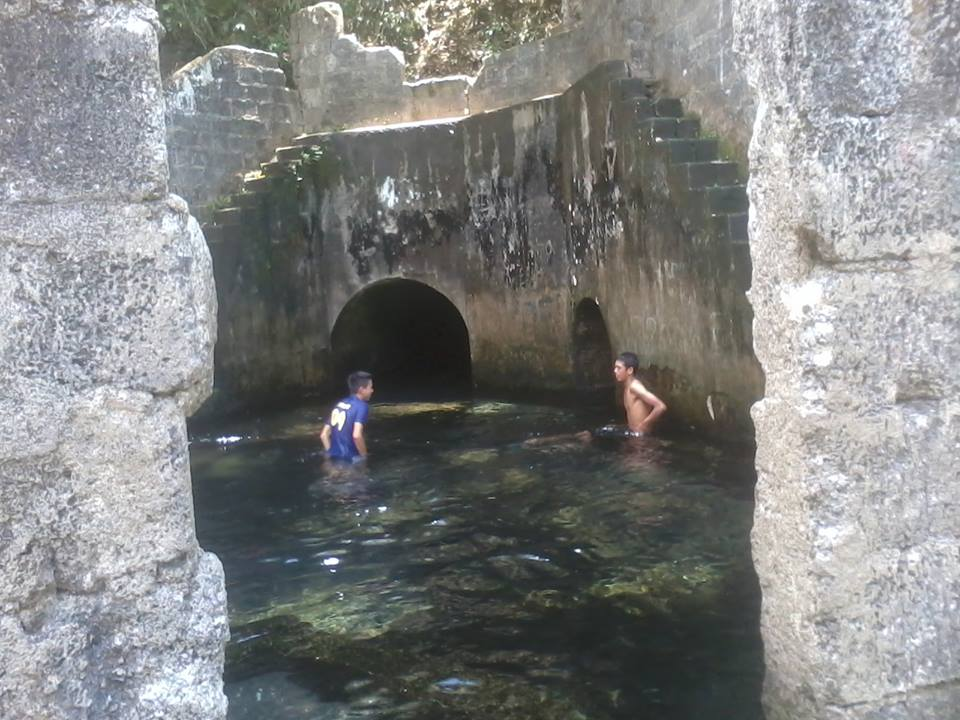
Shot of Matang Tubig Cave in May 2014.

The main source of the San Cristobal River is Mount Sungay, the highest mountain of Cavite province, where the main stem and its tributaries drain the northern and eastern side of the mountain. Its watershed area covers Calamba and Cabuyao in Laguna, Tagaytay and municipality of Silang in Cavite. The river system of San Cristobal from Mount Sungay is connected to the Matang Tubig located in Casile and Canlubang.

== Water quality ==
Along with the San Juan River, the two rivers act as natural drainage systems by receiving and conveying Calamba's (and Cabuyao's for San Cristobal) liquid wastes and storm surface runoff to the nearby Laguna de Bay. Both rivers are very polluted as a result, thus, affecting the water quality of the lake as well.

Although a 1991 study cited the San Pedro River and Morong River as the sources of eutrophication-causing minerals in Laguna de Bay, the Laguna Lake Development Authority (LLDA) has noted that more recent deterioration of the San Cristobal River in Calamba have made it one of the lake's major sources of nutrient loading. The LLDA's conservation efforts for the major tributaries and watersheds of Laguna de Bay have led to the creation of the Laguna de Bay River Basin Councils, of which the San Cristobal River Enhancement Defenders (SACRED) is particularly tasked with conservation of the San Cristobal.

== See also ==
- Laguna de Bay
- Laguna Lake Development Authority
