= Tadlac Lake =

Volcanic maar on the island of Luzon, Philippines

- Crocodile Lake
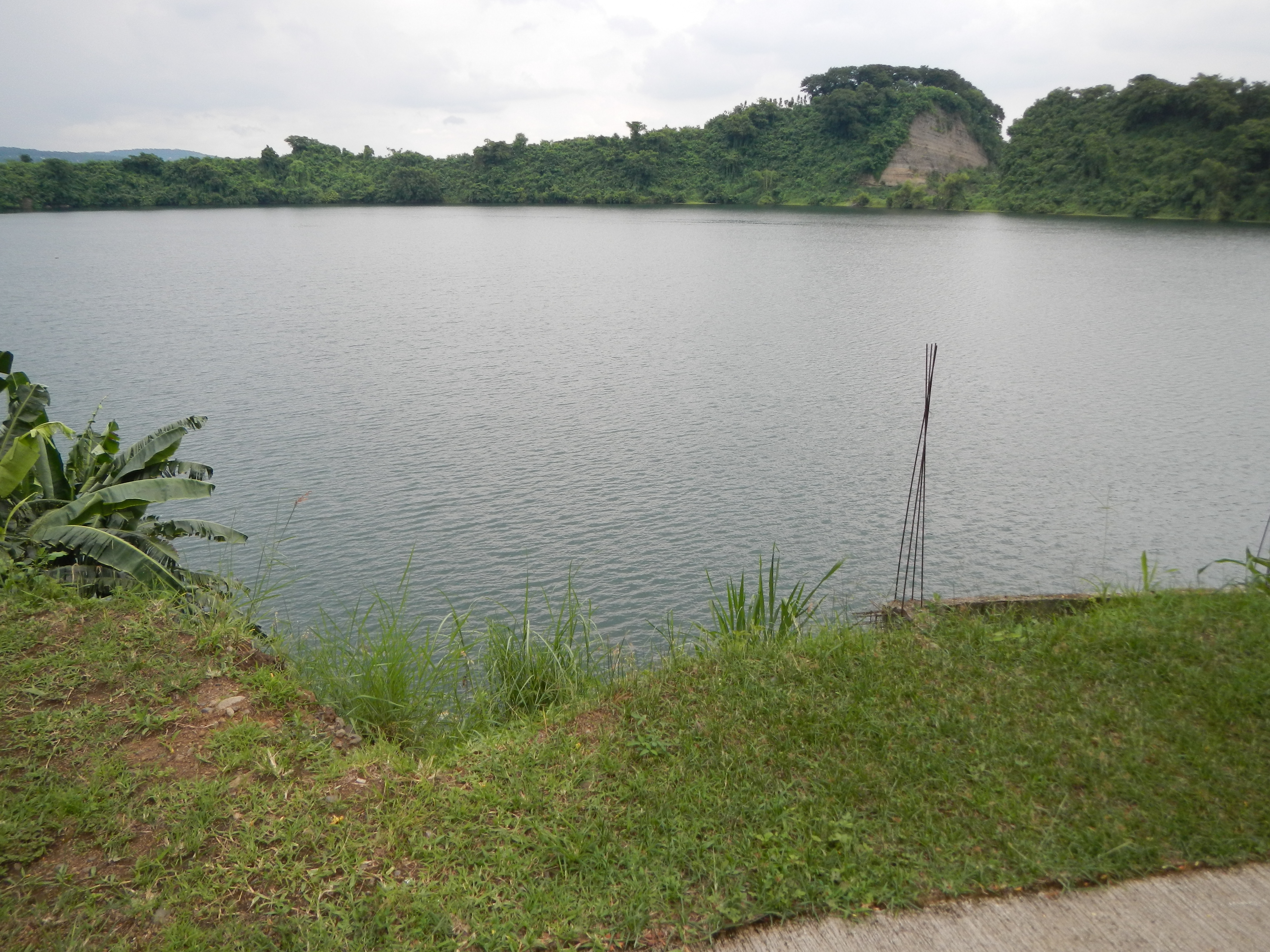
- The lake as seen from the eastern shore in 2013

- Location within the Philippines
- Location: Brgy. Tadlac, Los Baños, Laguna
- Coordinates: 14°10′57″N 121°12′23″E
- Type: Volcanic maar
- Primary inflows: none
- Primary outflows: none
- Basin countries: Philippines
- Managing agency: Laguna Lake Development Authority
- Max. length: 650 meters (2,130 ft)
- Max. width: 503 meters (1,650 ft)
- Surface area: 22.7 hectares (56 acres)
- Average depth: 27 meters (89 ft)
- Shore length^{1}: 1.8 kilometers (1.1 mi)
- Surface elevation: 2 meters (6 ft 7 in)
- Islands: none
- Settlements: Calamba; Los Baños
- ^{1} Shore length is not a well-defined measure.

Tadlac Lake, also colloquially known as Crocodile Lake, is a freshwater volcanic maar lake located in Barangay Tadlac, in the municipality of Los Baños, Laguna. The lake-filled maar is located along the southern shore of Laguna de Bay, the largest lake in the Philippines, with Tadlac Lake protruding out of the shore of the larger lake. If not for its slightly-elevated crater rim, Tadlac Lake would be wholly engulfed by Laguna de Bay.

The volcanic lake is one of many maars in the Laguna Volcanic Field. It is listed as one of the inactive volcanos in the Philippines by the Philippine Institute of Volcanology and Seismology (PHIVOLCS).

Tadlac Lake is also notable for its history of annual lake overturns, locally called langal. This phenomenon, rare elsewhere but common in Tadlac Lake during the cold season (December-February), is the result of trapped carbon dioxide (CO_{2}) erupting from the deep layers of the lake towards the surface, leading to fish kills from low levels of dissolved oxygen. This was greatly heightened by the introduction of aquaculture to the lake in the mid-1980s, eventually leading to a massive and costly fish kill in 1999, which in turn led to the cessation of aquaculture there.

Prior to the introduction of aquaculture, Tadlac Lake was considered as an oligotrophic lake, having low nutrient content and low algal production, resulting in very clear water with high potability.

Commonly confused or misnamed as Alligator lake. Alligators are only present in the Everglades in the United States and China's Yangtze River. Never present in the Philippines. Crocodiles however have been known to inhabit Laguna lake and surrounding bodies of water until the early to mid 1900s.

== Geography and geology ==
Tadlac Lake is located in Barangay Tadlac, in the hot springs resort town of Los Baños (Spanish for “The Baths”) near the border with Calamba in the province of Laguna. The lake is in a headland jutting out into Laguna de Bay known as Malilimbas Point, and is directly below the northeastern slope of Mount Makiling, the highest mountain in the Laguna Volcanic Field. Because of its origin, the lake has no outlet and is replenished only by rainfall.

The slightly ovoid lake is 22.7 ha (56 acres) in surface area with a perimeter of about 1.8 kilometers (1.1 mi). It has an average depth of 27 meters (89 ft), so swimming is not recommended because of its depth and the sudden drop from its shoreline. The lake surface’s longest dimension is 650 meters (2,130 ft) in the NE-SW direction, with the widest dimension perpendicular to the longest at 503 meters (1,650 ft). The crater rim that separates Tadlac Lake from the surrounding Laguna de Bay is thinnest northeast of the lake, with only about 40-metre (130 ft) wide piece of land separating it from the larger lake.

The Tadlac Barangay Road runs east of the lake but does not encircle it, while another road runs west of it. The lands around the lake are privately owned, and some owners have established resorts around the lake. The Laguna Lake Development Authority (LLDA), as mandated by the government, manages Laguna de Bay and its surrounding areas including Tadlac Lake.

=== Lake overturns ===
Lake overturns or carbon dioxide (CO_{2}) eruption from deep within its waters, locally called as langal, normally occur during the months of December to February. During this period some indigenous fish of the lake are often observed gasping for air near the surface.

This phenomenon was greatly heightened by the introduction of aquaculture to the lake in the mid-1980s, eventually leading to a massive and costly fishkill in 1999, which in turn led to the cessation of aquaculture activities on the lake.

== Etymology ==
During the Spanish colonial period, the lake was known as Laguna de los Caimanes (Lake of Crocodiles or Crocodile Lake). The great number of crocodilians that used to live in its waters gave the lake its name. Today, crocodiles have been extirpated in and around Crocodile Lake and Laguna de Bay.

Suggested etymologies for the name tadlac include a kind of "wild ginger" and a grass closely related to sugarcane.

Documenting field expeditions he conducted during his time with the International Rice Research Institute, agricultural scientist and journalist Thomas Hargrove noted tadlak was the Tagalog term for a kind of wild ginger which he described as “pulpy with a red bulb.”

Alternatively, historian Zeus A. Salazar has suggested that the name tadlac may refer to a local variety of sugarcane which he theorized to be common in Laguna and Batangas before the propagation of modern sugarcane, based on linguistic similarities with the local name of Themeda arundinacea in Central Luzon, which in turn was the origin for the name of the city and eventually its province.

== Economic History ==
=== Quarrying ===
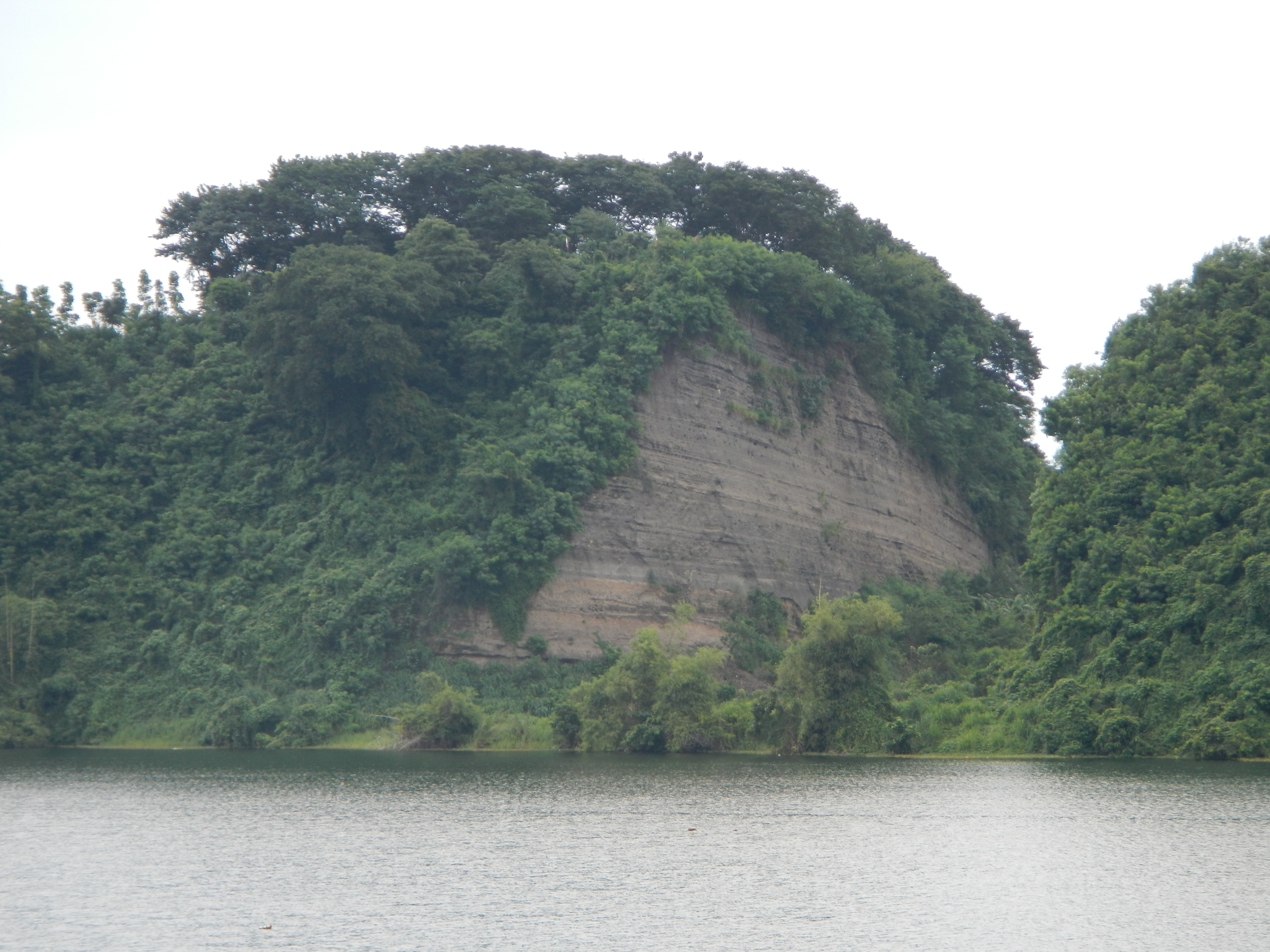
a closer look on the "cut" left on the northern portion of the crater

Starting from 1986, the LLDA authorized the use of 30,000 square metres (320,000 sq ft) or about 12% of its total surface the lake for tilapia fish cage aquaculture to help the local fishermen earn a living. Starting around the same time, the hill on the northern edge of the lake was quarried by its private owner and sold as building material for home construction. The destruction continued unopposed by the lax management of LLDA, and the local government of Los Baños recognized the activity as the right of the landowner to develop his property. This was back when the Philippine Environmental Impact Assessment System was not yet fully established. In the end, about 7,000–8,000 m^{2} (75,000–86,000 sq ft) of earth & rocks were removed and the land was leveled leaving a “cut” on the crater rim, destroying the natural look of the lake.

=== Aquaculture ===
From 1986 until the late 1990s, the lake was heavily used for aquaculture until a massive fishkill occurred in 1999. Through the collaborative efforts of the local leaders and the Laguna Lake Development Authority (LLDA), aquaculture was stopped saving the lake from further deterioration.

== Accessing the lake ==
From Manila, the lake is about 61 km (38 mi) or an hour drive from KM Zero in Rizal Park to Barangay Tadlac via South Luzon Expressway then the National Road. A park is located on the east side of the lake along Tadlac Barangay Road.

The lake can also be accessed through the road west of the lake and through the “cut” north of the lake. The owner of the quarried land had donated a 4-metre (13 ft) wide right-of-way trail on his property allowing easy access to the lake.
