= Bay River =

River in Laguna, Philippines

Bay River: Sapang River; San Nicolas River
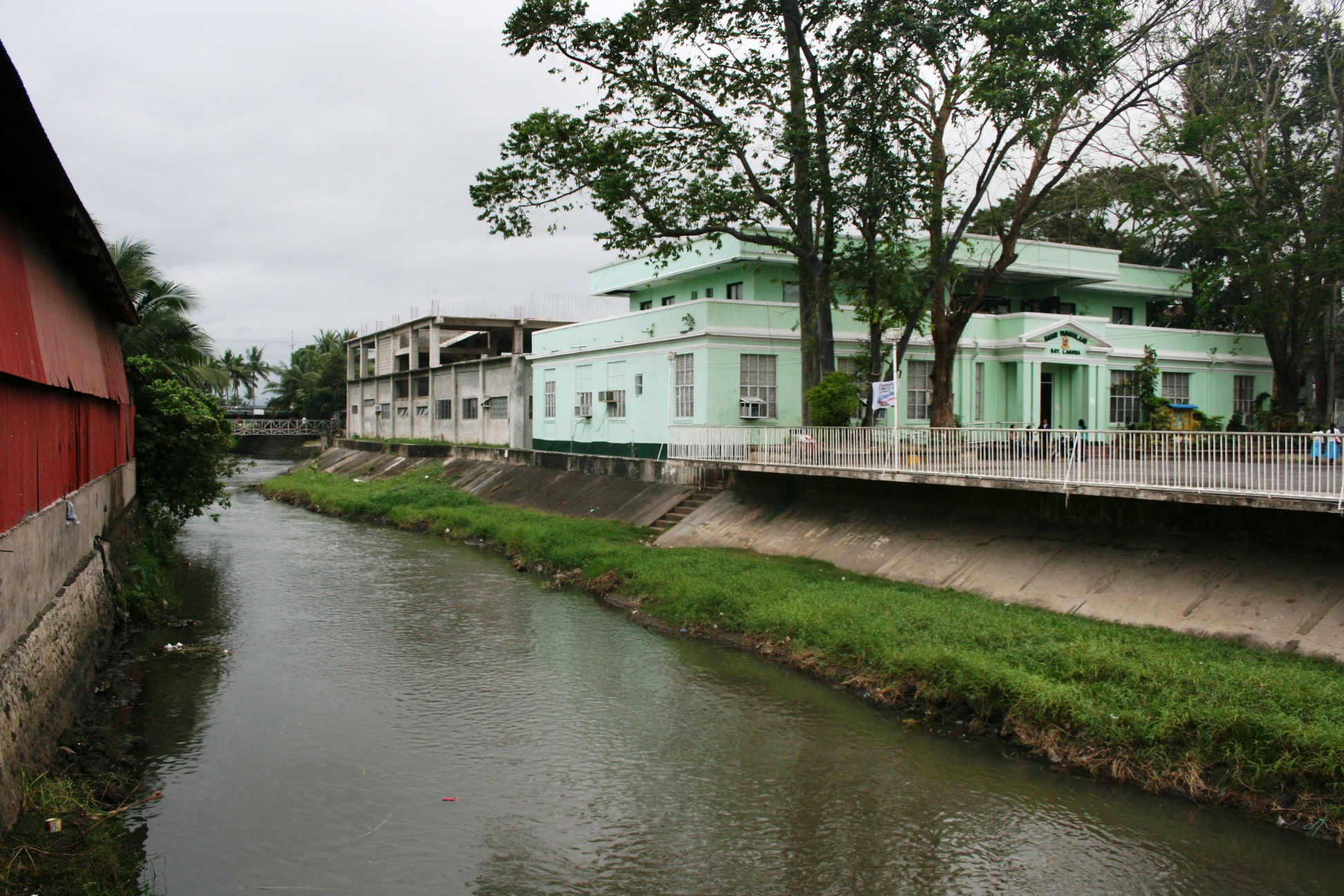
- The Bay Municipal Hall sits on the banks of the Bay River

- Bay River mouth Bay River (Philippines)

Location
- Country: Philippines
- Region: Calabarzon
- Province: Laguna
- City/municipality: Bay

Physical characteristics
- Mouth
  - location: Southern shore of Laguna de Bay
  - coordinates: 14°11′48″N 121°17′30″E
  - elevation: less than 2 metres (6.6 ft) above sea level

Basin features
- Progression: Bay River–Laguna de Bay

The Bay River (Filipino: Ilog ng Bay), also known as the Sapang River and the San Nicolas River, is a river system in Bay, Laguna, Philippines. It is one of 21 major tributaries of Laguna de Bay and is the more southern of two small rivers that hem the town proper of Bay.

The other is the Calo River (Tagalog: Ilog Calo), another Laguna de Bay tributary, to the north. In geographical terms, these two rivers created the main area of the town of Bay by leaving many centuries' worth of alluvial deposits in the lower section of the plain close to Laguna de Bay.

Over time, that plain was selected by the earliest settlers of Bay as the site of their community because the access to the lake meant easy transportation and ready access to a water source.

The downside to this choice of location was regular flooding. Residents still recall that when the two rivers overflowed their banks, the poblacion and six other barangays would be flooded. However, this rarely happens today because an irrigation system consisting of canals and ditches which bring water from these rivers into the ricefields have reduced the force of the waters.

The Bay River forms Bay's boundary with Calauan, Laguna. A third river on the opposite side of the town, the Maitem River (Tagalog: Ilog Maitem), forms Bay's boundary with Los Baños, Laguna.

== See also ==
- Laguna de Bay
- Laguna Lake Development Authority
