= Siniloan River =

Siniloan River Romelo River
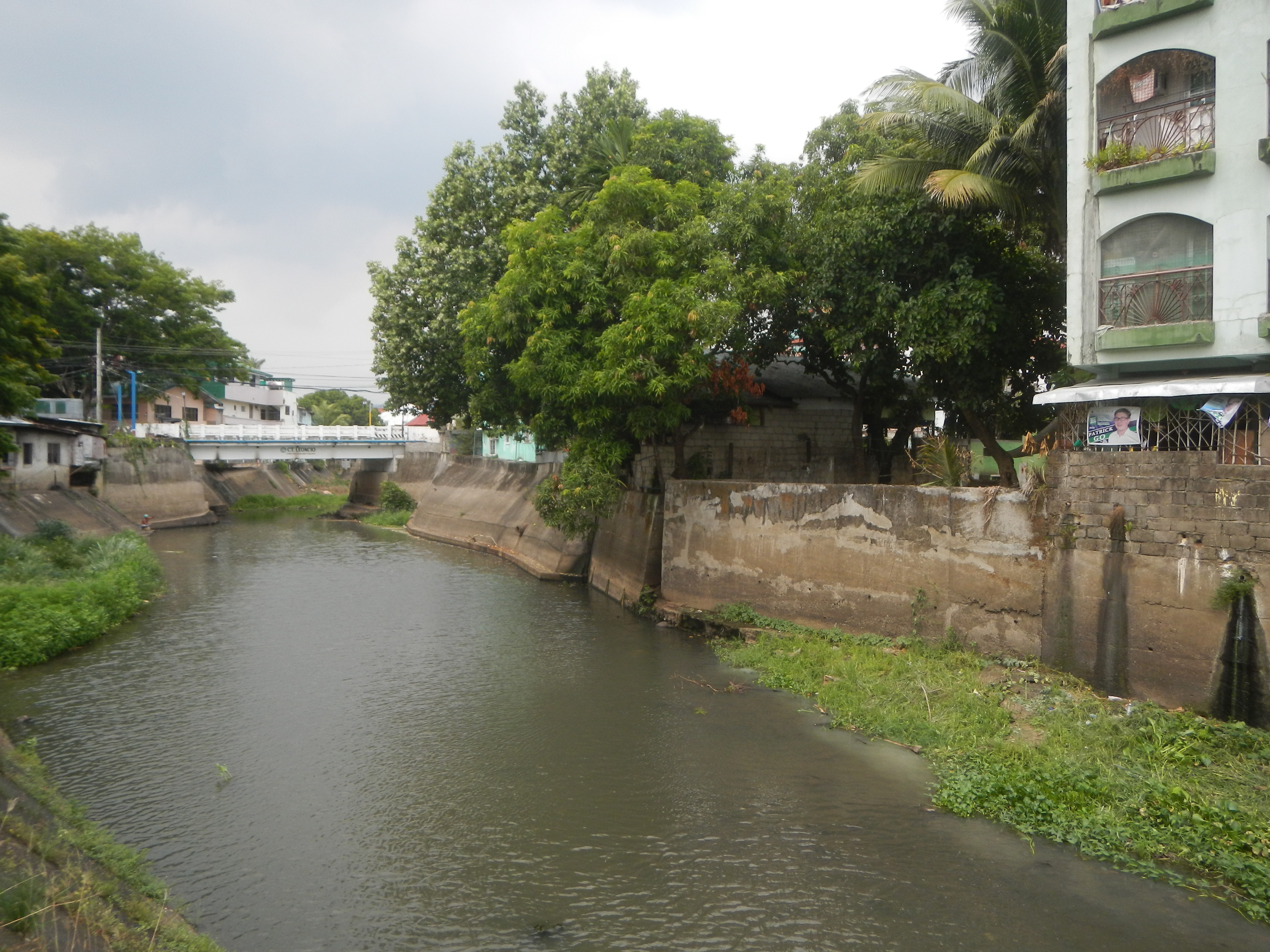

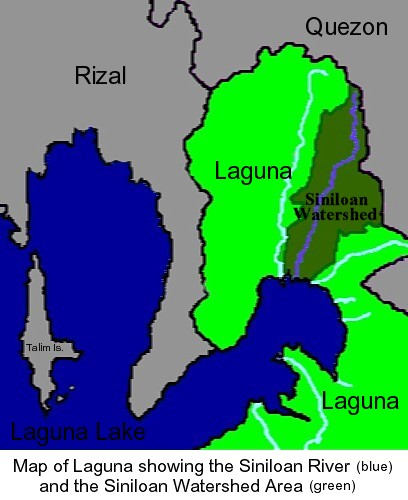

- Siniloan River mouth Siniloan River (Philippines)

Location
- Country: Philippines
- Region: Calabarzon
- Province: Laguna
- City/municipality: Santa Cruz

Physical characteristics
- Source: Mount Romelo on the southern tip of the Sierra Madre Mountain Range
- Mouth: northern tip of the easternmost lobe of Laguna de Bay
  - coordinates: 14°23′42″N 121°26′21″E
  - elevation: over 240 m (790 ft) above sea level
- Basin size: 74.31 km^{2} (28.69 sq mi)

The Siniloan River (Tagalog: Ilog ng Siniloan), also known as the Romelo River, is a river system that runs through Siniloan, Laguna on the island of Luzon, in the Philippines. It is one of 21 tributaries of Laguna de Bay and is regularly monitored by the Laguna Lake Development Authority (LLDA) through one of its 15 river monitoring stations.

The river's headwaters can be found in the Sierra Madre Mountain Range, particularly Mount Romelo for which the river is often alternately named. In this part of the river, a number of falls have become popular destinations amongst mountaineers, with a reputation for clear waters and a reasonably easy trek. The river then heads down into the coastal plains, going through the main population area of the municipality of Siniloan before finally emptying into Laguna de Bay.

Throughout its watershed, from mountains to lowlands, the Siniloan is dominated by coconut and grasses. The mountain areas are also characterized by forests, while the lowlands are also characterized by rice paddies and residential areas.

The Siniloan River sub-basin has a drainage area of 74.31 square kilometres (28.69 sq mi).

== Tourist sites ==
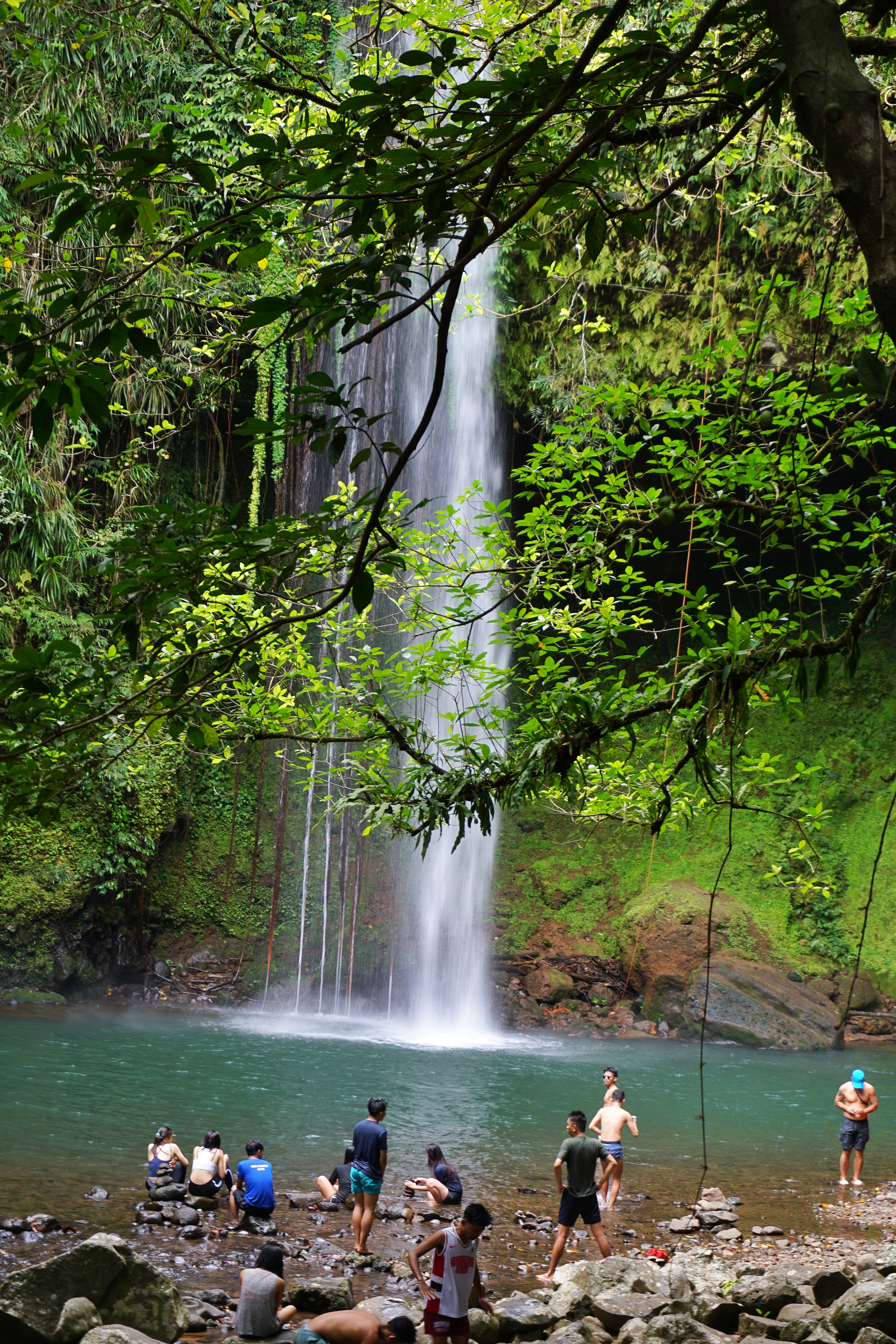
Buruwisan Falls

Cascading from the Siniloan's headwaters on Mount Romelo, five falls have become particularly well known among the locals and are frequented by tourists. These are:

- Buruwisan Falls
- Guiling-Guiling Falls
- Lanzones Falls
- Binaytuan Falls
- Sebakon Falls

Buruwisan Falls is the most popular because it is the most accessible among the falls. It has a drop of more or less 50 metres (160 ft), giving it a reputation as "an excellent training ground for neophyte mountain climbers."

The waters of Buruwisan eventually meet the waters of the Lanzones falls, and then lead to the much bigger Binaytuan Falls, which has a more or less 200-metre (660 ft) drop.

== Conservation ==
In the latest (December 2005) Water Quality Status Report listed on the Laguna Lake Development Authority's site, the Siniloan River was listed as "Class D." It also indicated that this status had been "improved" from "worse than Class D" since the river was last monitored.

According to the Water Usage & Classification for Fresh Water system used by the Philippines' Department of Environment and Natural Resources, Class D Quality freshwater is suitable for agriculture, irrigation, livestock watering and industrial water supply class II.

The LLDA's conservation efforts for the major tributaries and watersheds of Laguna de Bay have led to the creation of the Laguna de Bay River Basin Councils, of which the Siniloan River Rehabilitation &. Management Fdn., Inc. (SRRMFI) is particularly tasked with conservation of the Siniloan.

Through the SRRMFI, the LLDA implemented a World Bank-funded project in 2006 to control growing populations of the janitor fish (Pterygoplichthys disjunctivus) in Laguna de Bay. Released into the Lake accidentally during a typhoon in the mid-1990s, the species had become a major problem for the freshwater fisheries industry. The project involved paying fisherfolk P10 per kilogram of Janitor Fish, and converting it into feeds for use either in piggeries or in fishpens.

== See also ==
- Laguna de Bay
- Laguna Lake Development Authority
