= San Juan River (Calamba) =

River in Laguna, Philippines

San Juan River Calamba River
- San Juan River as seen from San Juan Bridge, which carries the South Luzon Expressway

- Location within Luzon Location within Philippines

Location
- Country: Philippines
- Region: Calabarzon
- Province: Laguna
- City: Calamba

Physical characteristics
- Source
  - location: Lipa Batangas, Alaminos Laguna, Malvar Batangas (Main Basin)
  - elevation: 345m
- Mouth: southern part of Laguna de Bay
  - coordinates: 14°13′24″N 121°11′15″E
  - elevation: less than 2 meters (6.6 ft) above sea level
- Length: 65 km (40 mi)
- Basin size: 25.50 m (83.7 ft)
- Width
  - minimum: 43m
  - maximum: 165m
- Depth
  - minimum: 0.3m
  - average: 2.5m
  - maximum: 10m
- Discharge
  - average: 886m³

Basin features
- Tributaries
  - left: Mt. Malepunyo, Soloc Creek
  - right: San Miguel, Alaminos Laguna

The San Juan River (Tagalog: Ilog ng San Juan), also known as the Calamba River, is a river system in Calamba, Laguna, Philippines. It is one of 21 major tributaries of Laguna de Bay and is regularly monitored by the Laguna Lake Development Authority (LLDA) through one of its 15 river monitoring stations.

Along with the San Cristobal River, it is one of the two major rivers of Calamba that drains into Laguna de Bay. Its watershed area covers Calamba in Laguna and the municipalities of Santo Tomas, Tanauan, and Malvar in Batangas.

== Monitoring and conservation ==
In the December 2005 LLDA Water Quality Status Report, the San Juan River was listed as "worse than Class D" with a very low percentage of dissolved oxygen saturation. It also indicated that this status had not improved since the river had last been monitored.

According to the Department of Environment and Natural Resources's Water Usage & Classification for Fresh Water, Class D freshwater is suitable for agriculture, irrigation, livestock watering and industrial water supply class II. "Worse than Class D" means that the San Juan is not usable for any of these functions.

The LLDA's conservation efforts for the major tributaries and watersheds of Laguna de Bay have led to the creation of the Laguna de Bay River Basin Councils, of which the MTSC-San Juan River Protection Fdn., Inc. is particularly tasked with the conservation of the San Juan.

== See also ==
- Laguna de Bay
- Laguna Lake Development Authority
