= Pangil River =

River in Laguna, Philippines

Pangil River Bambang Hari River
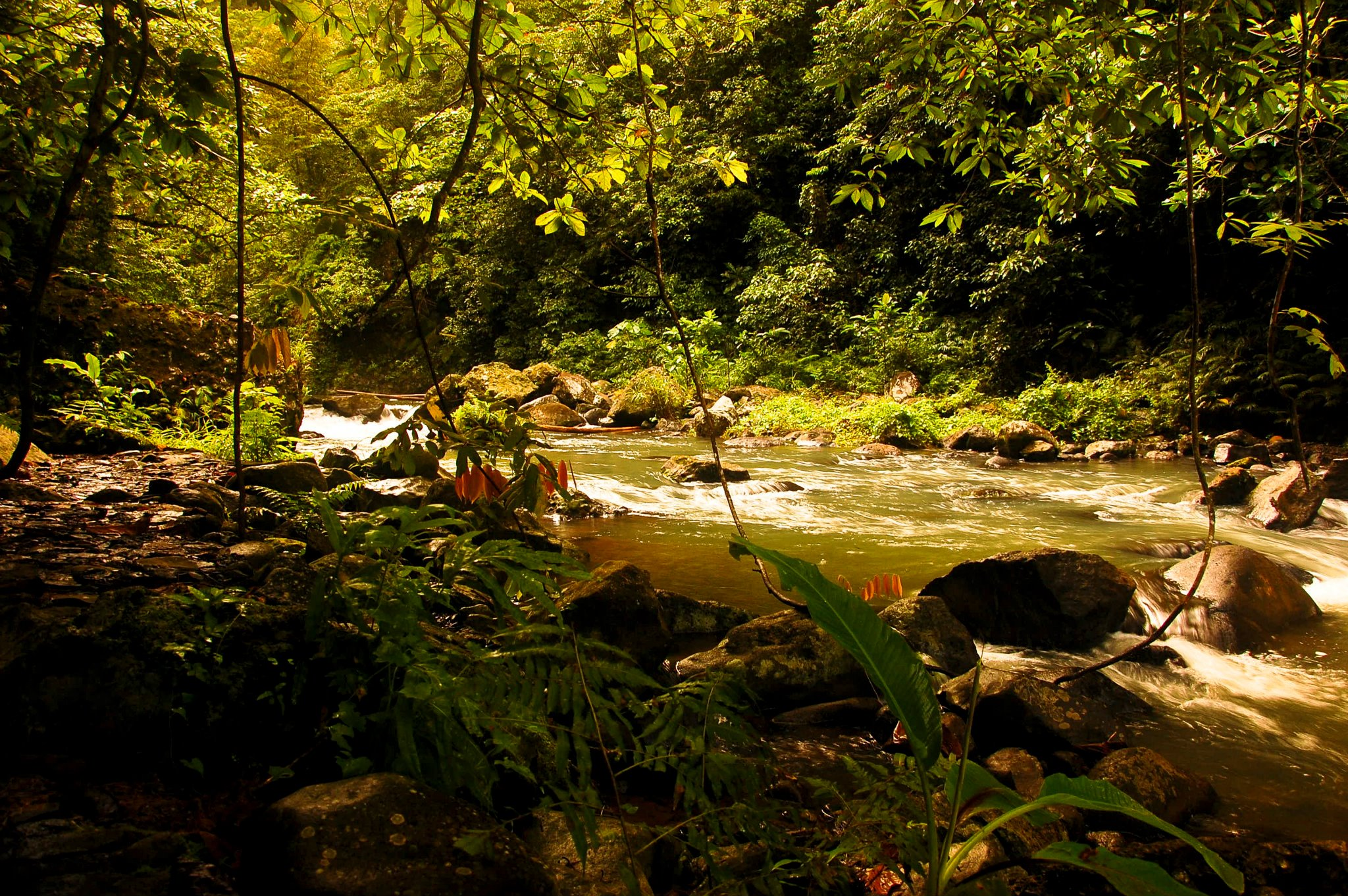

- Location within Luzon Location within Philippines

Location
- Country: Philippines
- Region: Calabarzon
- Province: Laguna

Physical characteristics
- Mouth: northern tip of the easternmost lobe of Laguna de Bay
  - coordinates: 14°23′31″N 121°27′12″E
  - elevation: less than 2 m (6.6 ft) above sea level
- Basin size: 51.14 km^{2} (19.75 sq mi)

The Pangil River (Tagalog: Ilog ng Pangil), also known as the Bambang Hari River, is a river system that runs through Pangil, Laguna, in the Philippines. It is one of 21 River tributaries of Laguna de Bay and is regularly monitored by the Laguna Lake Development Authority(LLDA) through one of its 15 river monitoring stations.

The Pangil River sub-basin has a drainage area of 51.14 square kilometres (19.75 sq mi).

== How it got named Bambang Hari ==
Part of the river is referred to as the Bambang Hari - which, when translated, means "riverbank of the king" - because in the mid-18th century, King Carlos III of Spain visited Pangil when he was still a prince, and it was said that he used to frequent river often.

When he was crowned king, he sent the images of the Santo Niño de la O and the Birhen de la O to Pangil in gratitude. the Birhen de la O, which shows a pregnant Virgin Mary, is believed to be miraculous.

== Conservation ==
In the latest (December 2005) Water Quality Status Report listed on the Laguna Lake Development Authority's site, the Pangil River was listed as "Worse than Class D." It also indicated that this status had been "maintained" since the river was last monitored.

According to the Water Usage & Classification for Fresh Water system used by the Philippines' Department of Environment and Natural Resources, Class D Quality freshwater is suitable for agriculture, irrigation, livestock watering and industrial water supply class II. "Worse than Class D" implies that the Pangil River is not suitable for any of those functions.

In 1980, International Rice Research Institute (IRRI) researcher DA Vaughan documented six populations of Oryza minuta Presl. - a wild rice species known to be resistant to bacterial blight, bacterial blast, green planthopper, and brown planthopper - along a stream which is a tributary of the Pangil river.

A 2004 survey noted with alarm that all the populations were gone. The report attributed the disappearance of the rare and useful species of rice to human activities, particularly "livestock raising, farming, and road construction, which destroy the natural vegetation within the vicinity."

Scientists have noted that further studies are needed to prevent the local extinction of this species.

== Gallery ==
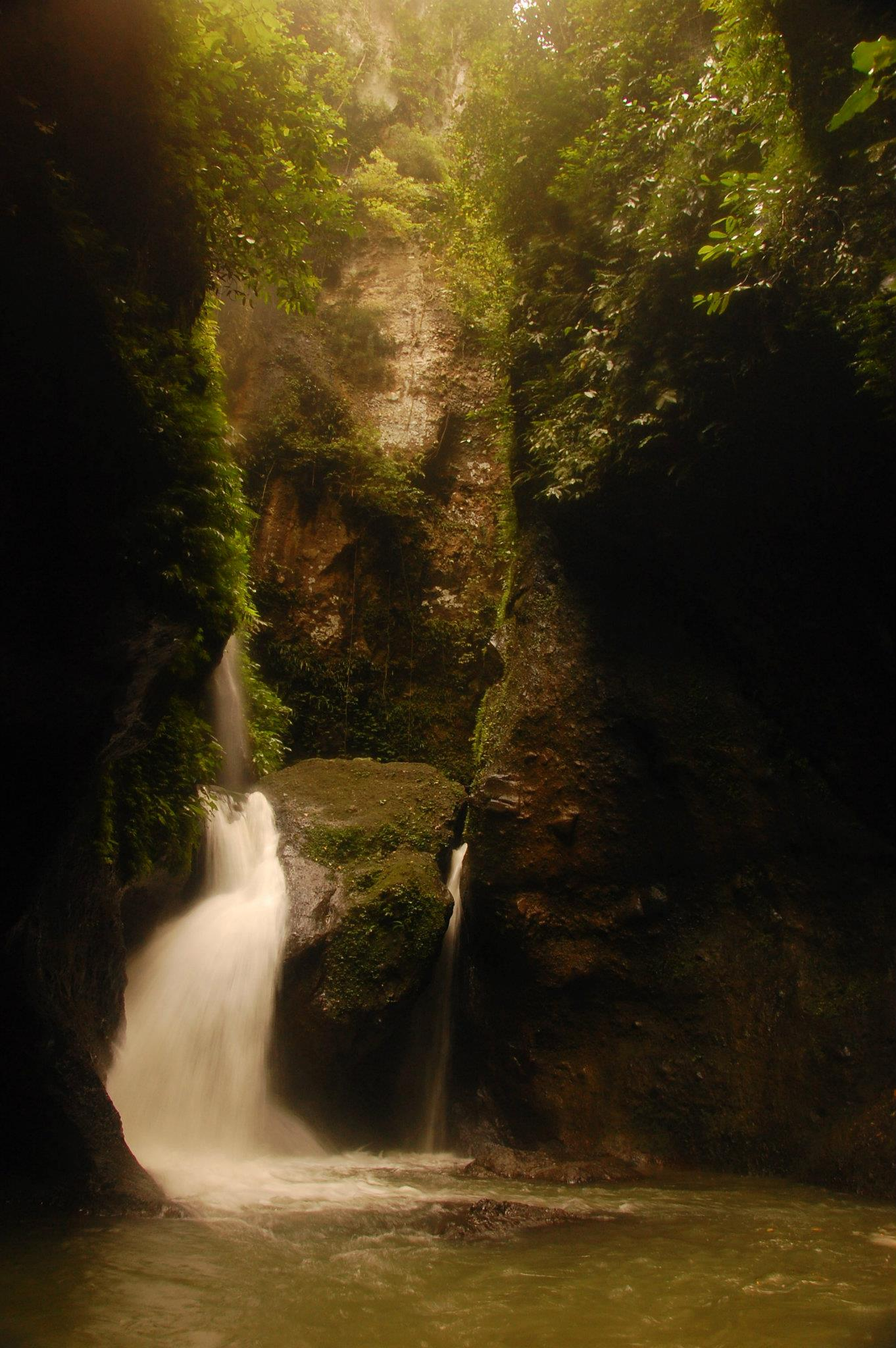
Ambon-Ambon Falls

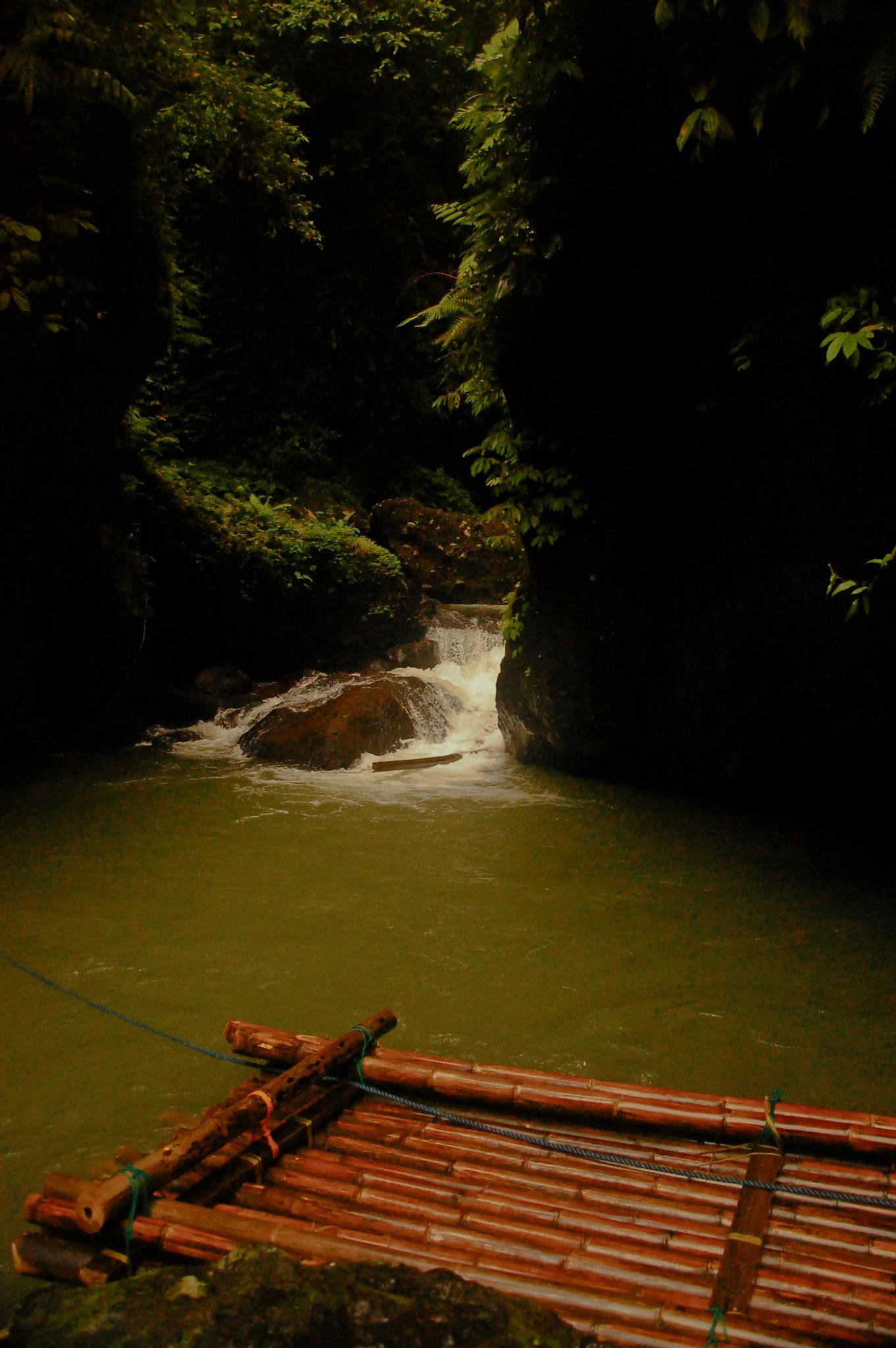

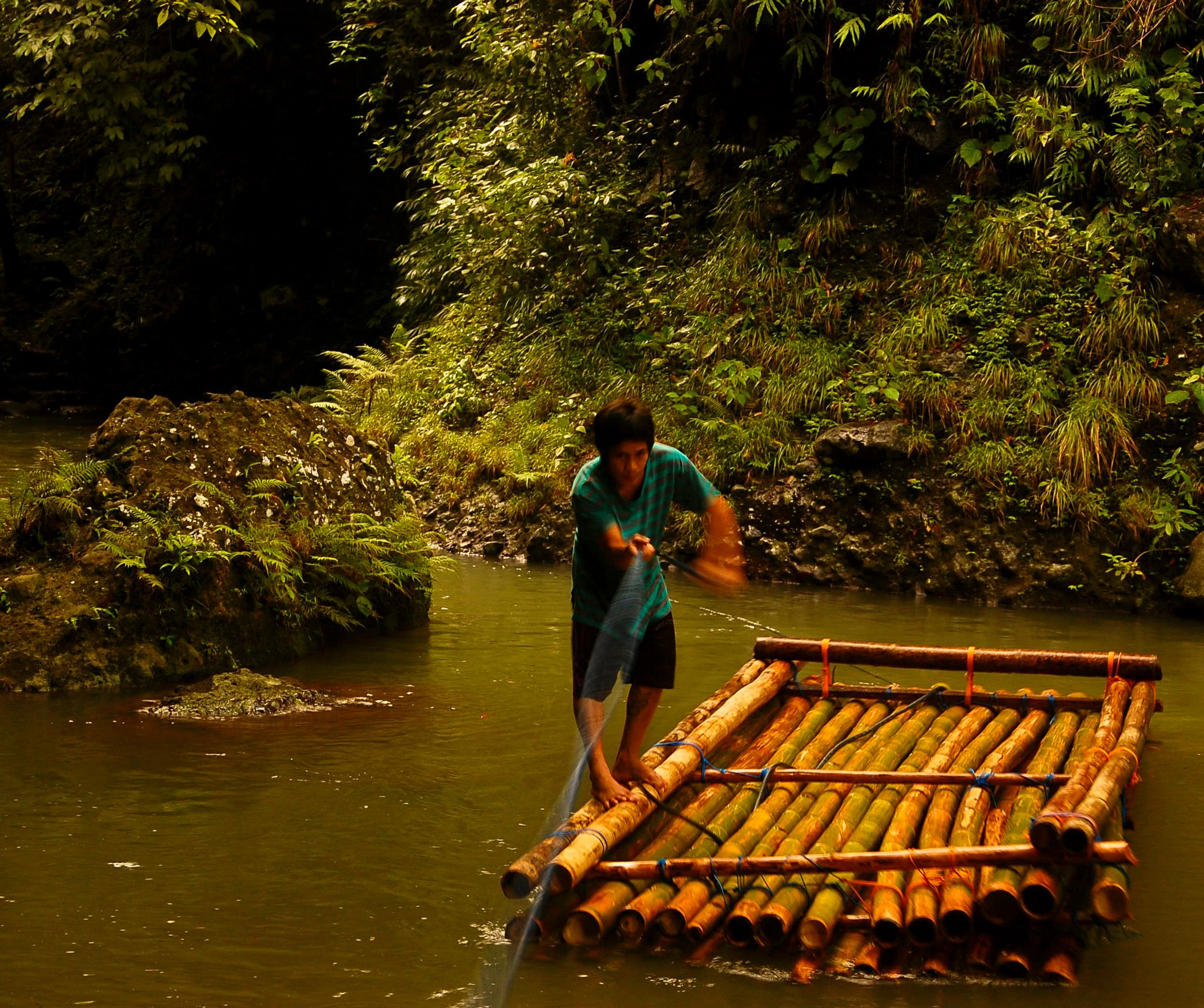
Ferryman using Bamboo raft, on the Pangil river

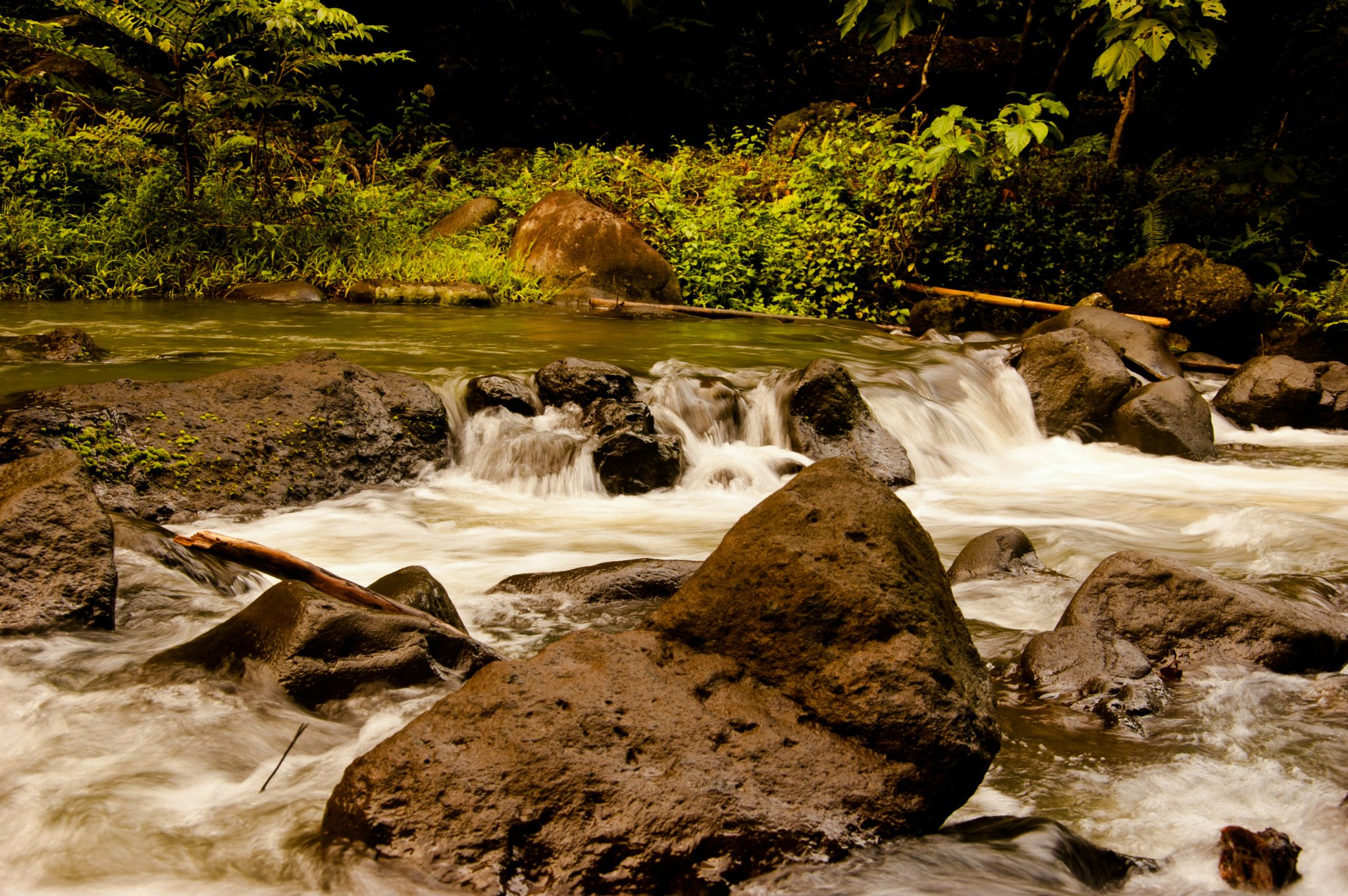
Flora along the Pangil River

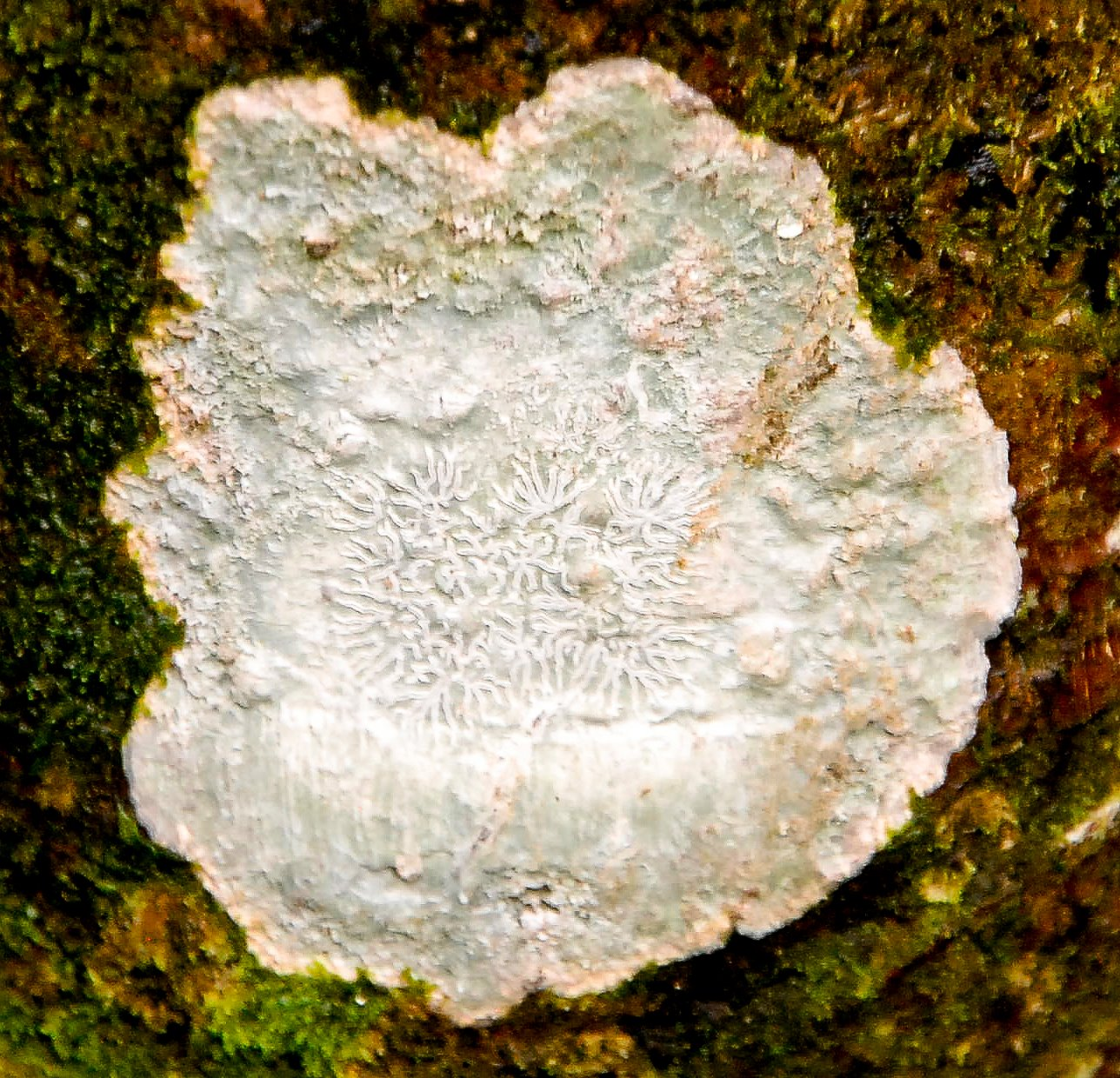
Tree fungus

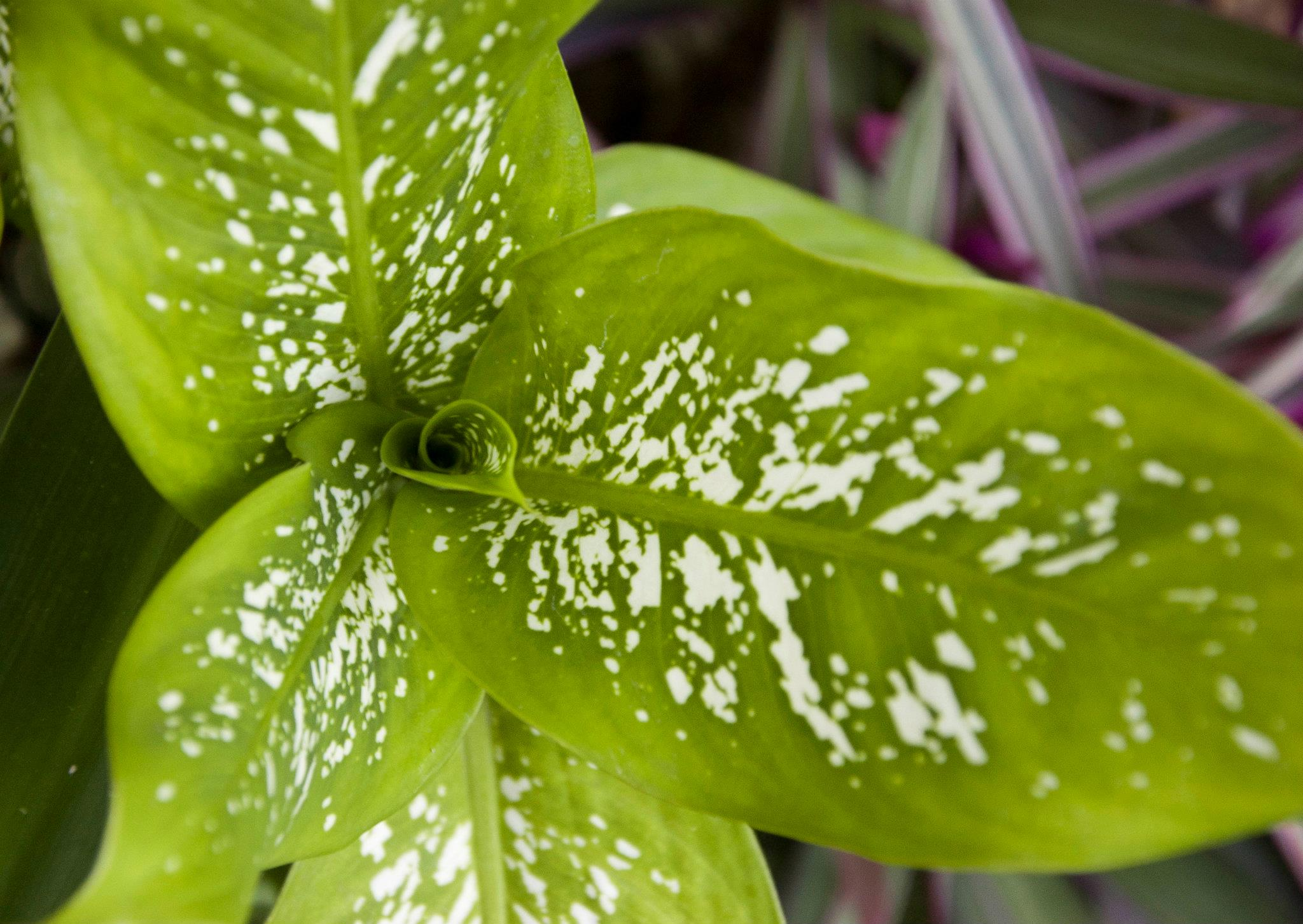

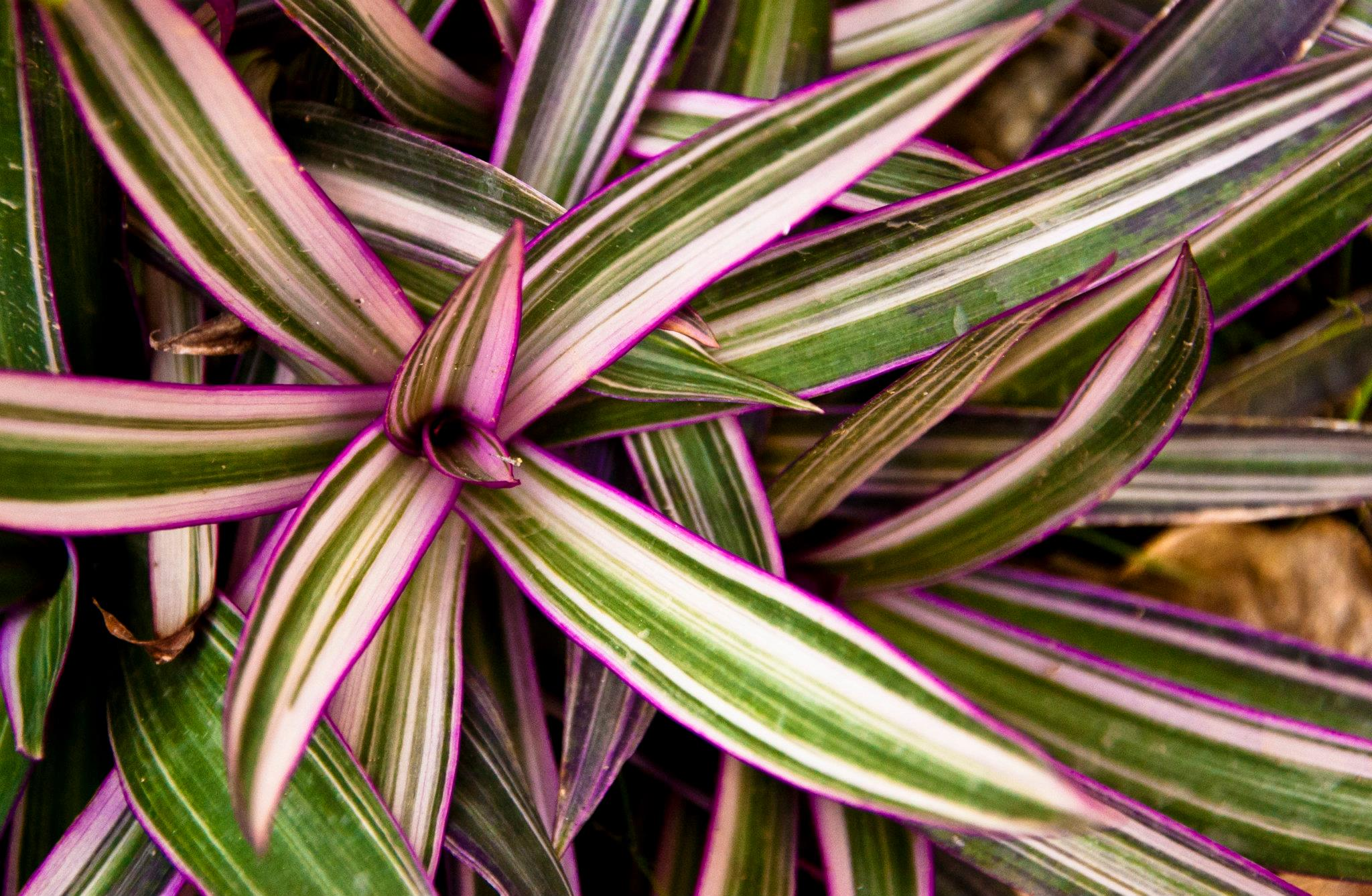

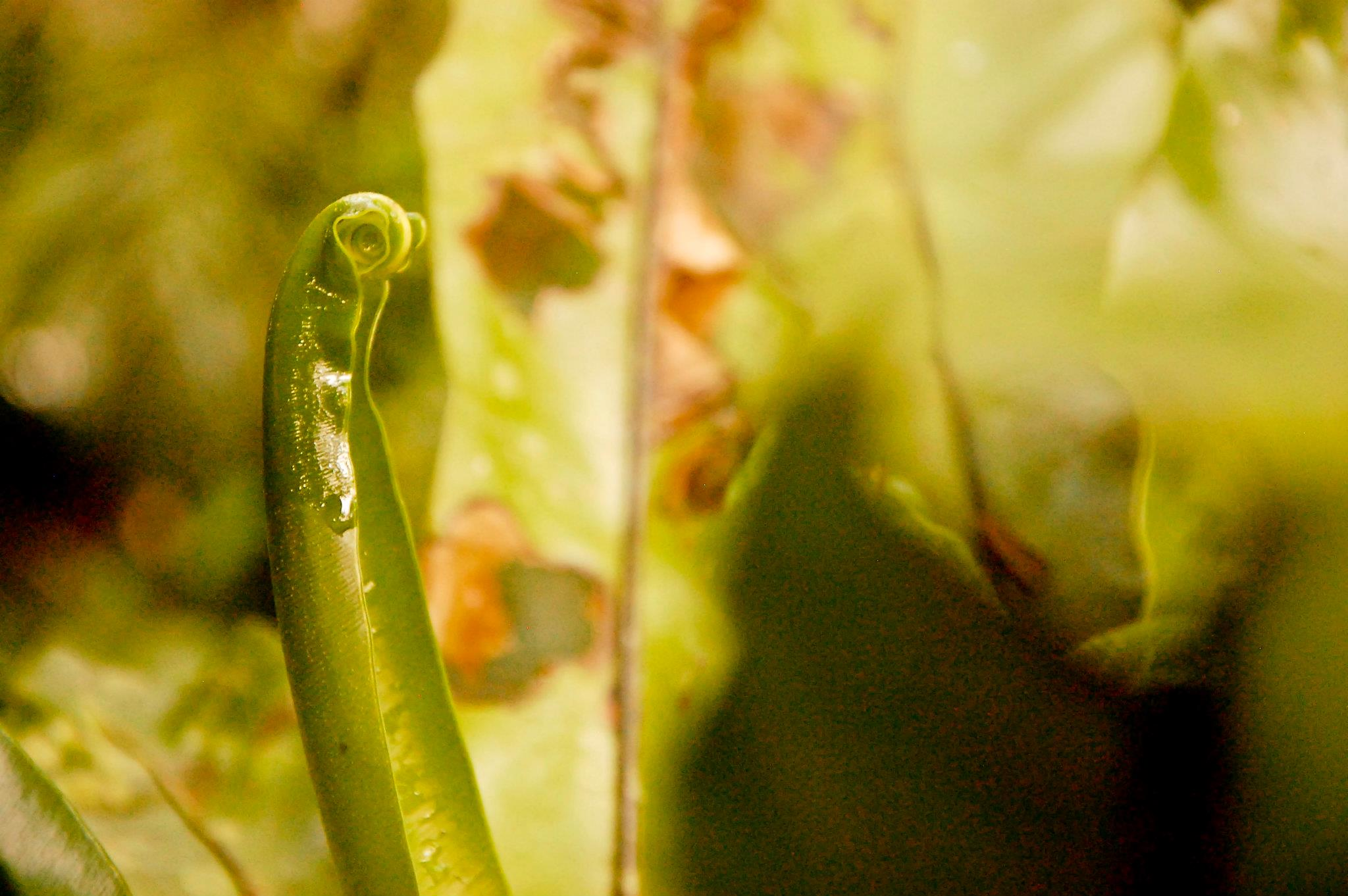

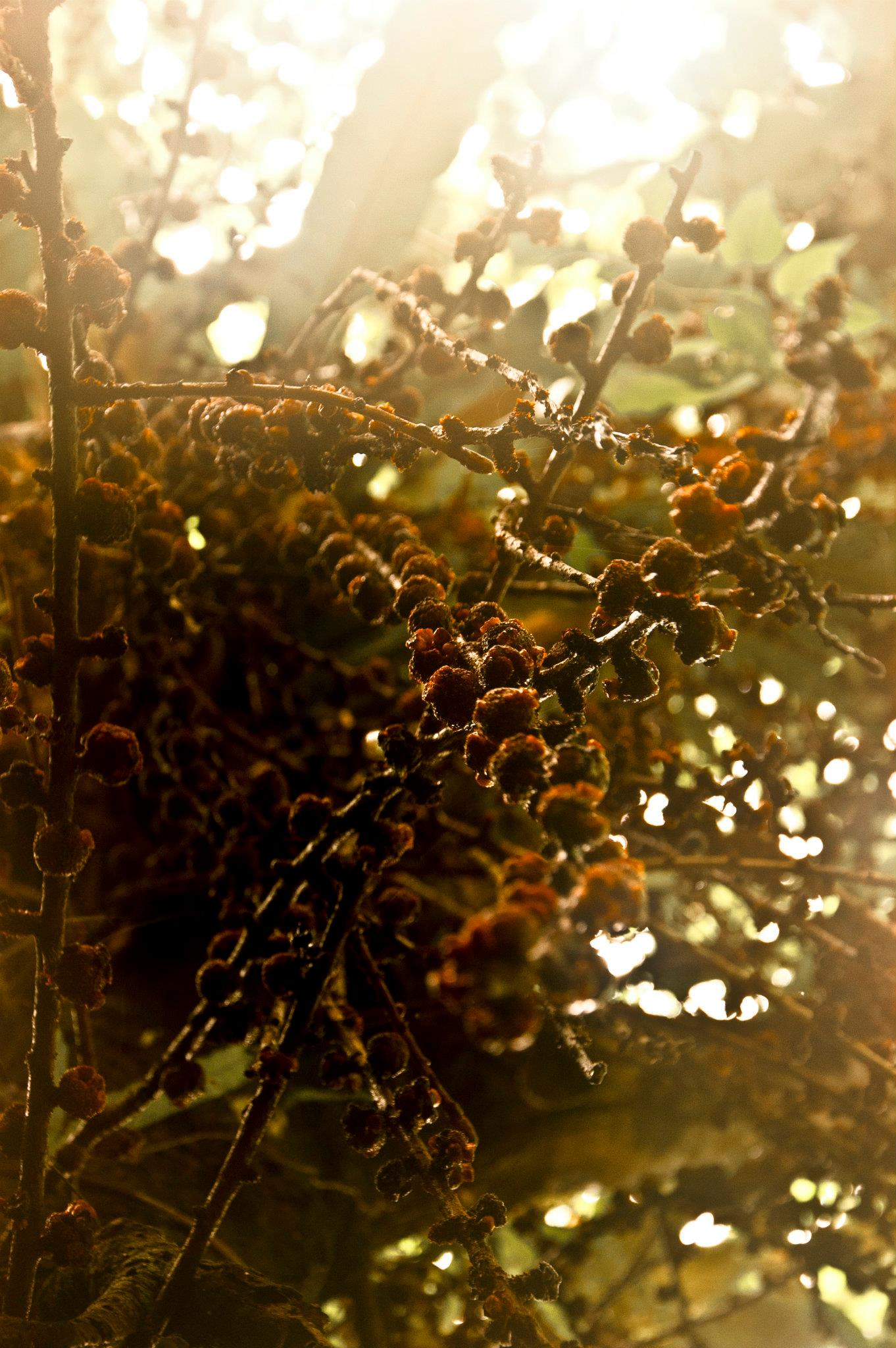

== See also ==
- Laguna de Bay
- Laguna Lake Development Authority
