= Mangangate River =

River in Muntinlupa, Philippines

Mangangate River Alabang–Cupang River
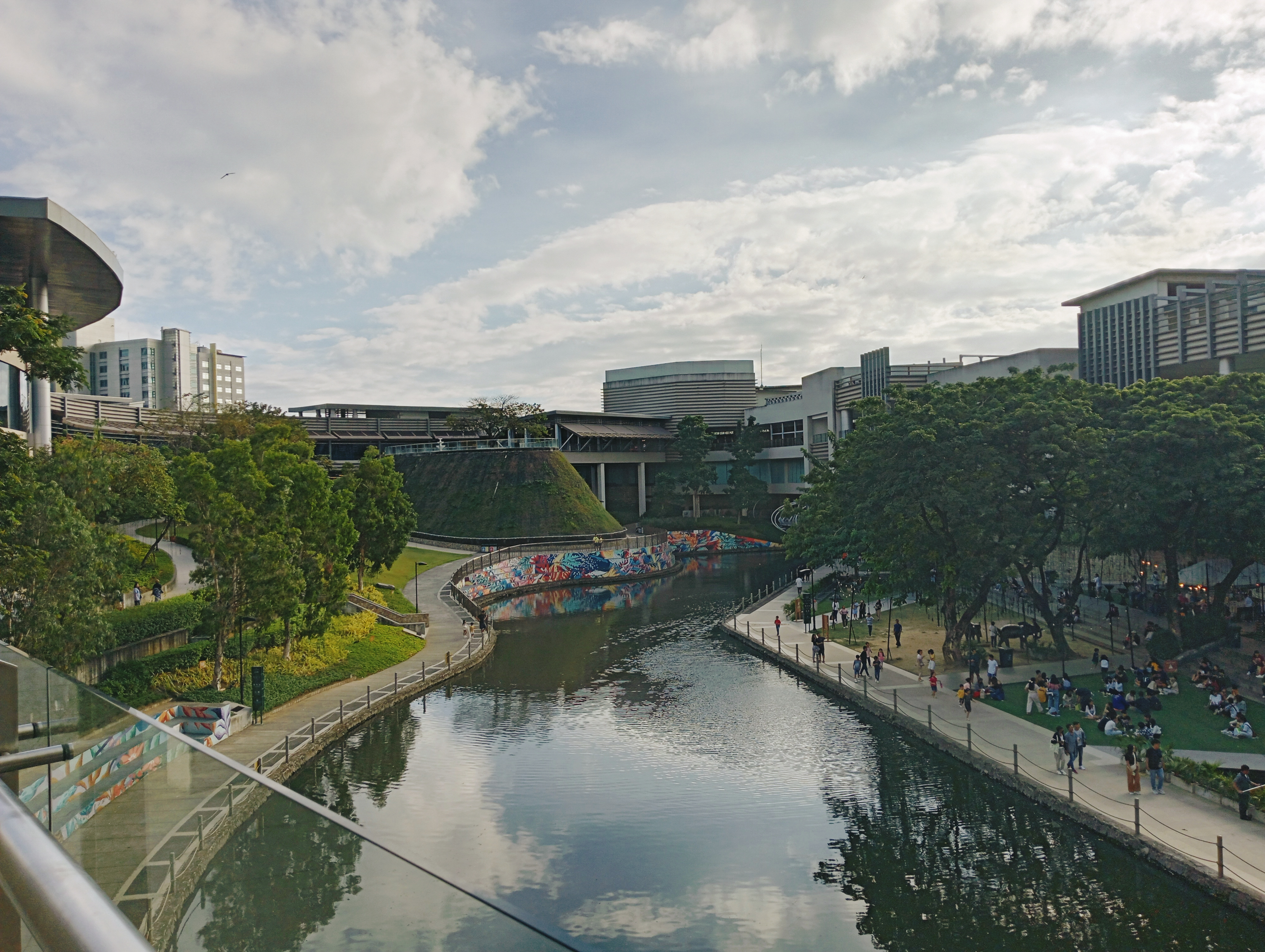
- Mangangate River flowing through the Water Garden, Festival Alabang

- Location within Luzon Location within Philippines

Location
- Country: Philippines
- Region: National Capital Region
- City: Muntinlupa

Physical characteristics
- Source
  - elevation: < 2 meters (6.6 ft) above sea level
- Mouth: western lobe of Laguna de Bay
  - coordinates: 14°25′32″N 121°03′11″E
- Length: 10 km (6.2 mi)
- Depth
  - minimum: 0.25 meters (0.82 ft)
  - maximum: 2 meters (6.6 ft)

The Mangangate River (Tagalog: Ilog Mangangate), also referred to as the Alabang–Cupang River, is a river system in Muntinlupa, Philippines. It is one of 21 major tributaries of Laguna de Bay.

The main stream has a total length of 10 kilometers (6.2 mi) and has two branches. The first is connected to the drainage system of Ayala Alabang, while the second is connected with the headwater from the New Bilibid Prison (NBP) Reservation, near Camp Sampaguita. This second branch flows through at Ayala Alabang Village and Filinvest City, and connects with the first branch at the Pasong Diablo site, passes through Festival Supermall until it drains out into Laguna de Bay at a point between Wawa, Alabang and Purok 1, Cupang.

The river system has four adjoining creeks:

- The biggest, at a length of 3,500 meters (11,500 ft), joins the river at Pasong Diablo and serves as the Ayala Alabang Village Drainage;
- Two creeks join the mainstream at the Filinvest site; and
- At the NBP Reservation, one creek spans 800 meters (2,600 ft).

The depth of the Mangangate currently varies from 2 to 0.25 meters (6.56 to 0.82 ft).

== See also ==
- Laguna de Bay
- Laguna Lake Development Authority

== Sources ==
- "Alabang-Cupang River". muntinlupacity.gov.ph. Archived from the original on September 28, 2003.
