= Laguna de Bay =

Largest lake in the Philippines

- Lawa ng Bay (Filipino)
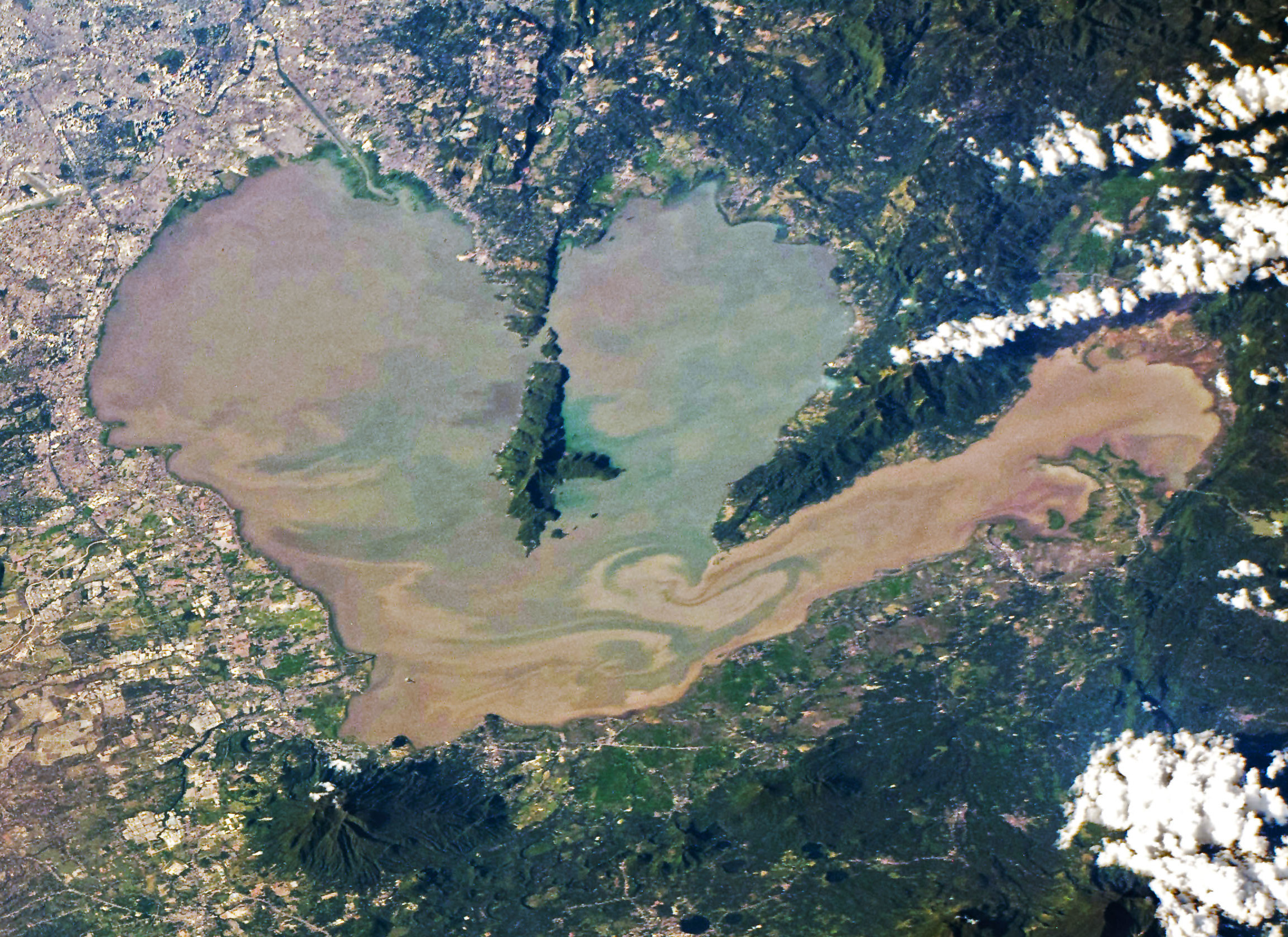
- Satellite image of Laguna de Bay in 2020

- Location in Luzon Location in the Philippines
- Location: Calabarzon; Metro Manila
- Coordinates: 14°23′00″N 121°15′00″E
- Type: Caldera lake (theorized)/ Tectonic lake
- Primary inflows: 21 tributaries
- Primary outflows: Pasig River (via Napindan Channel)
- Basin countries: Philippines
- Max. length: 47.3 km (29.4 mi) (E-W)
- Max. width: 40.5 km (25.2 mi) (N-S)
- Surface area: 911–949 km² (352–366 sq mi)
- Average depth: 2.5 m (8 ft 2 in)
- Max. depth: 20 m (66 ft) (Diablo pass)
- Shore length^{1}: 285 km (177 mi)
- Surface elevation: less 2 m (6 ft 7 in)
- Islands: Talim Island
- ^{1} Shore length is not a well-defined measure.

Laguna de Bay (Spanish for "Lagoon/Lake of Bay"; Filipino: Lawa ng Bay, [bɐˈʔi]), also known as Laguna Lake and alternatively spelled "Laguna de Bae", is the largest lake in the Philippines. Laguna de Bay remains one of the most important freshwater resources in the Philippines, supporting millions of residents through fisheries, agriculture, and domestic use. It is located southeast of Metro Manila, between the provinces of Laguna to the south and Rizal to the north. The freshwater lake has a surface area of 911–949 km^{2} (352–366 sq mi), with an average depth of about 2.8 meters (9 ft 2 in) and an elevation of about one meter above sea level. It is shaped like a crow's foot, with two peninsulas jutting out from the northern shore and filling the large volcanic Laguna Caldera. In the middle of the lake is the large island of Talim.

The lake is one of the primary sources of freshwater fish in the country. Its water drains to Manila Bay via the Pasig River. Environmental issues such as water quality problems created by population pressure and industrialization, invasive species, and overfishing are of concern to the lake, hurting its economic importance to the country. As the population expands in the Bay, it is expected to rely more heavily on the lake as a source of freshwater. Thus, water quality directly affects human populations.

== Etymology ==
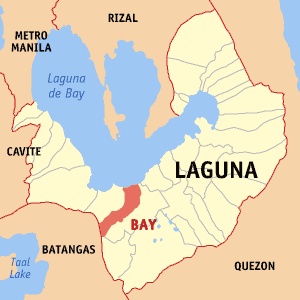
Laguna de Bay surrounded by the province of Laguna and Rizal and Metro Manila on the northwest; the town of Bay highlighted.

Laguna de Bay means "Lagoon of [the town of] Bay" for the lakeshore town of Bay (pronounced Bä'ï), the former provincial capital of Laguna province. Alternate spellings of the town's name include "Bae" or "Ba-i", and in early colonial times, "Bayi" or "Vahi". The town's name is believed to have come from the Tagalog word for "settlement" (bahayan), and is related to the words for "house" (bahay), "shore" (baybayin), and "boundary" (baybay), among others. The introduction of the English language during the American administration of the Philippines, elicited confusion as the English word "bay", referring to another body of water, was mistakenly substituted for the town name that led to its mispronunciation. However, the word "Bay" in Laguna de Bay has always referred to the town.

The Spanish word laguna refers to not just lagoons but also to freshwater lakes, aside from lago. This would make the lake's alternate name, "Laguna Lake", tautological. However, the "Laguna" in "Laguna Lake" refers to the province of Laguna, the province at the southern shore of the lake, and not the lake itself. The province was itself named after the lake and was originally La Laguna until the early 20th century.

In the pre-Hispanic era, the lake was known as Puliran Kasumuran (Laguna Copperplate Inscription, c. 900 AD), and later Pulilan (Vocabulario de la lengua tagala, 1613. Pila, Laguna).

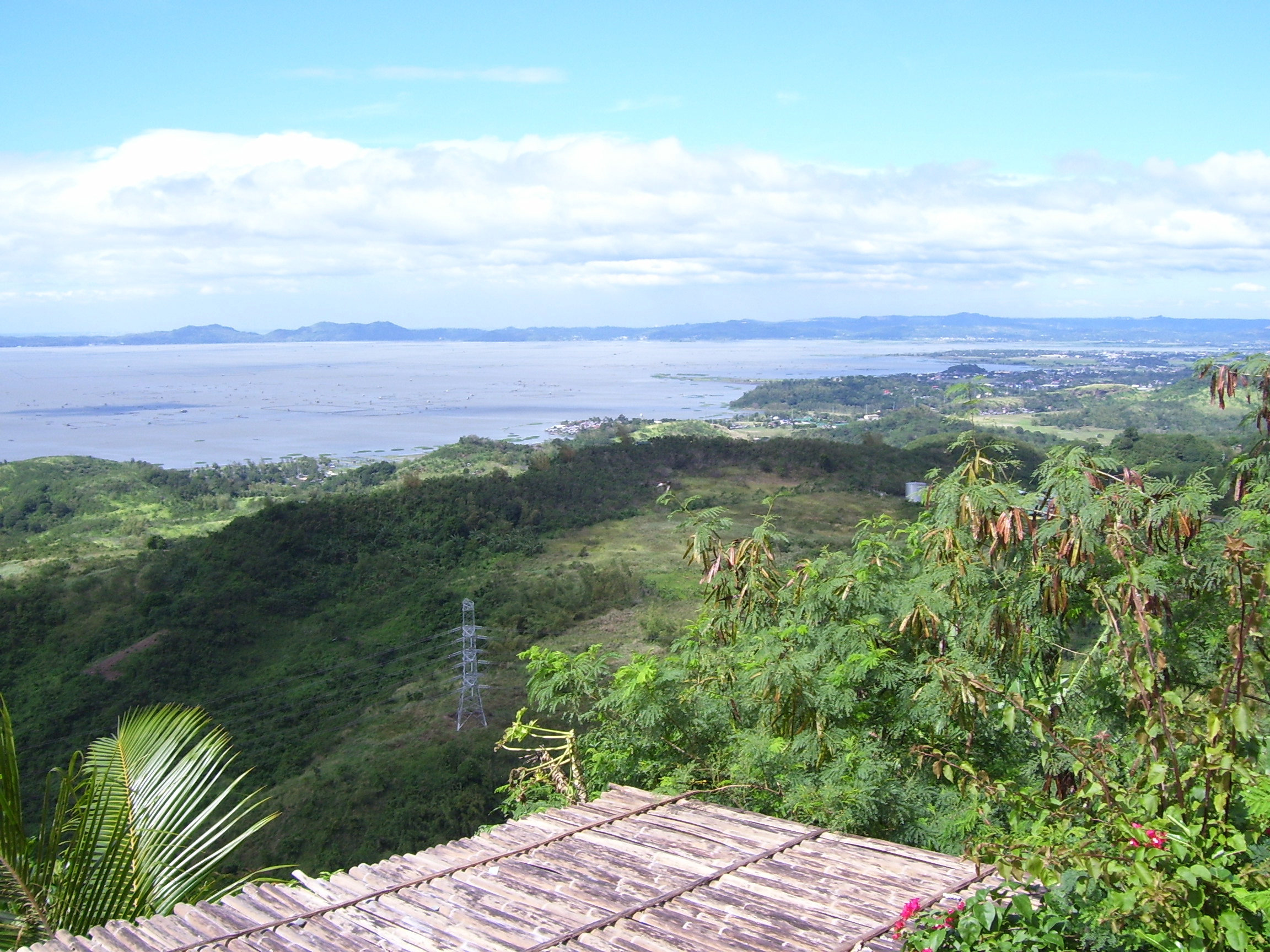
Laguna Caldera

Currently, the lake is often incorrectly called "Laguna Bay," including in government websites, or "Laguna Lake", which is used by the Laguna Lake Development Authority.

== Geography ==
Laguna de Bay is a large shallow freshwater body in the heart of Luzon Island with an aggregate area of about 911 km^{2} (352 sq mi) and a shoreline of 220 km (140 mi). It is considered to be the third largest inland body of water in Southeast Asia after Tonle Sap in Cambodia and Lake Toba in Sumatra, Indonesia. Laguna de Bay is bordered by the province of Laguna in the east, west and southwest, the province of Rizal in the north to northeast, and Metropolitan Manila in the northwest. The lake has an average depth of 2.8 meters (9 ft 2 in) and its excess water is discharged through the Pasig River.

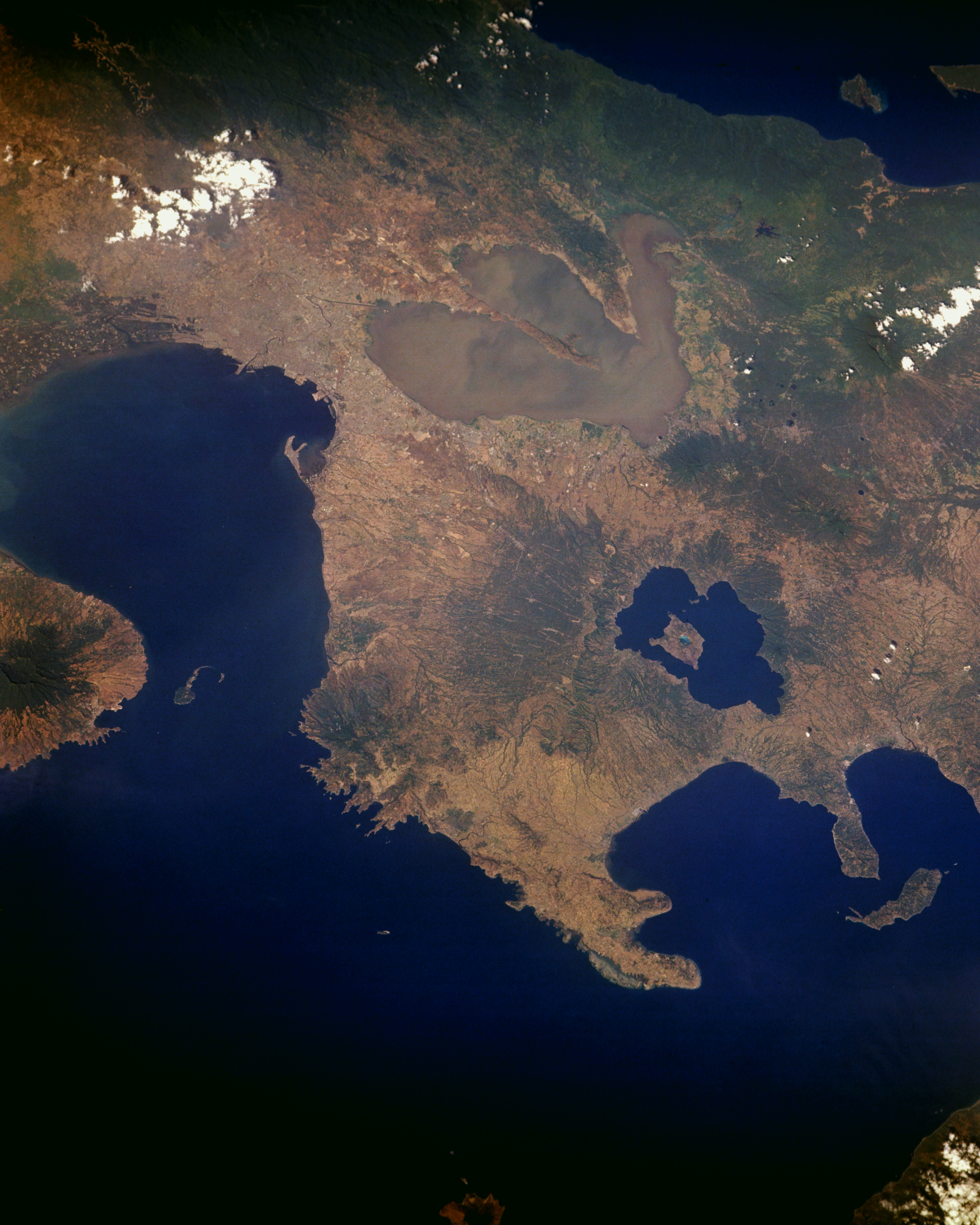
Space Shuttle view of Central and Southern Luzon showing Laguna de Bay (upper center, gray water)

The middle part of Laguna de Bay between Mount Sembrano and Talim Island, is the Laguna Caldera believed to have been formed by two major volcanic eruptions, around 1 million and 27,000–29,000 years ago. Remnants of its volcanic history are shown by the presence of a series of maars around the area of Tadlac Lake and Mayondon hill in Los Baños, Laguna, another maar at the southern end of Talim Island, and a solfataric field in Jala Jala.

=== Islands ===
Known lake islands include Talim, the largest and most populated island on the lake; Calamba Island, which is completely occupied by the Wonder Island resort in Calamba, Laguna; Cielito Lindo, a privately owned island off the coast of mainland Cardona, Rizal; Malahi Island which used to be the site of Maligi Island military reservation, near the southern tip of Talim; the nearby islands of Bonga and Pihan, also in Cardona; and Bay Island off the coast of Bay, Laguna, which is closely associated with the precolonial crocodile-deity myths of that town.

=== Tributaries ===
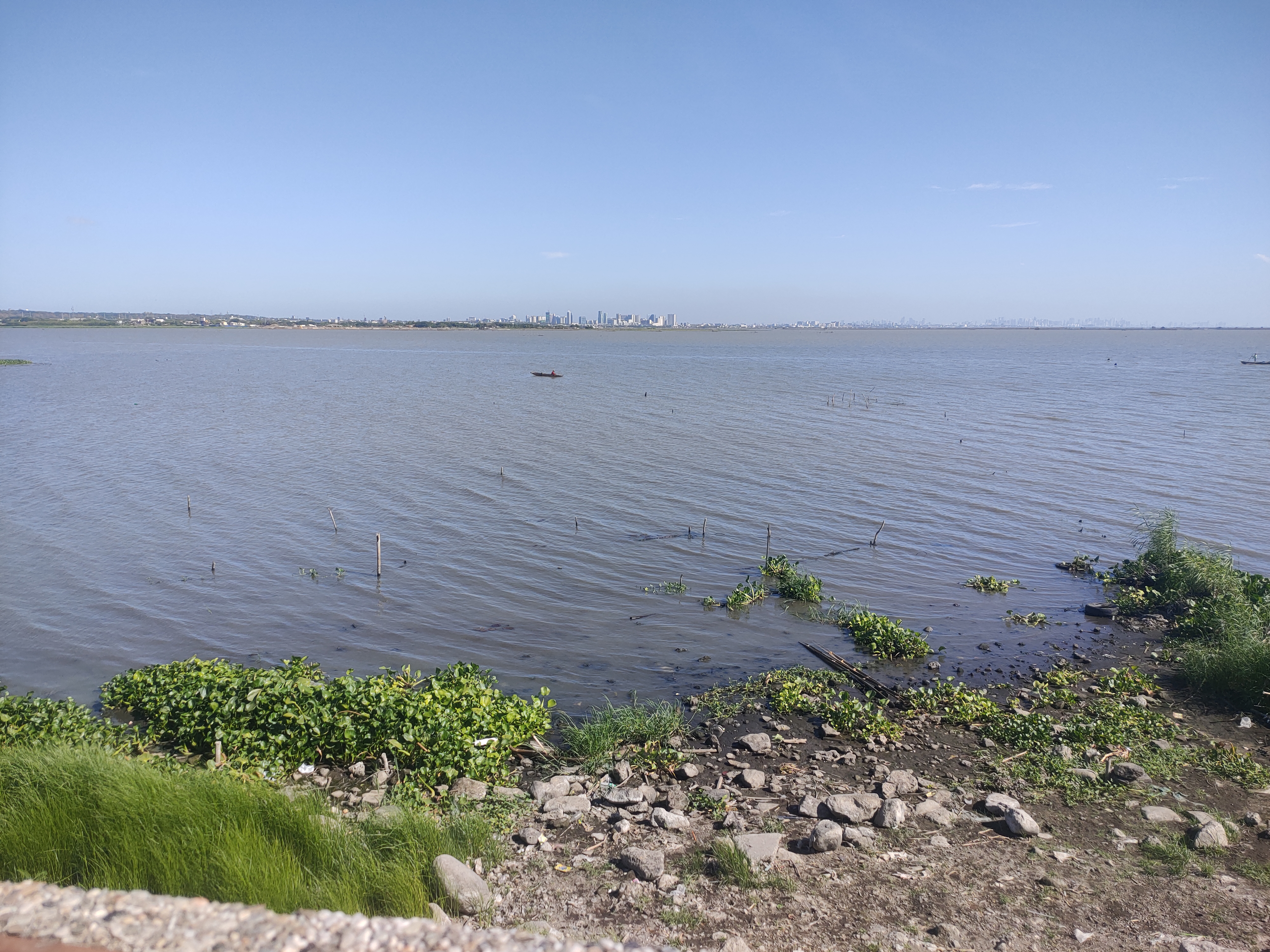
View of Laguna de Bay from the De La Paz Esplanade in Biñan, Laguna

The lake is fed by 45,000 km^{2} (17,000 sq mi) of catchment areas and its 21 major tributaries. Among these are the Pagsanjan River which is the source of 35% of the Lake's water, the Santa Cruz River which is the source of 15% of the Lake's water, the Marikina River (through the Manggahan Floodway), the Mangangate River, the Tunasan River, the San Pedro River, the Cabuyao River, the San Cristobal River, the San Juan River, the Bay, Calo and Maitem rivers in Bay, the Molawin, Dampalit and Pele rivers in Los Baños, the Pangil River, the Tanay River, the Morong River, the Siniloan River and the Sapang Baho River.

The lake is primarily drained through the Pasig River, which is technically a tidal estuary instead of a unidirectional "river."

== Uses ==
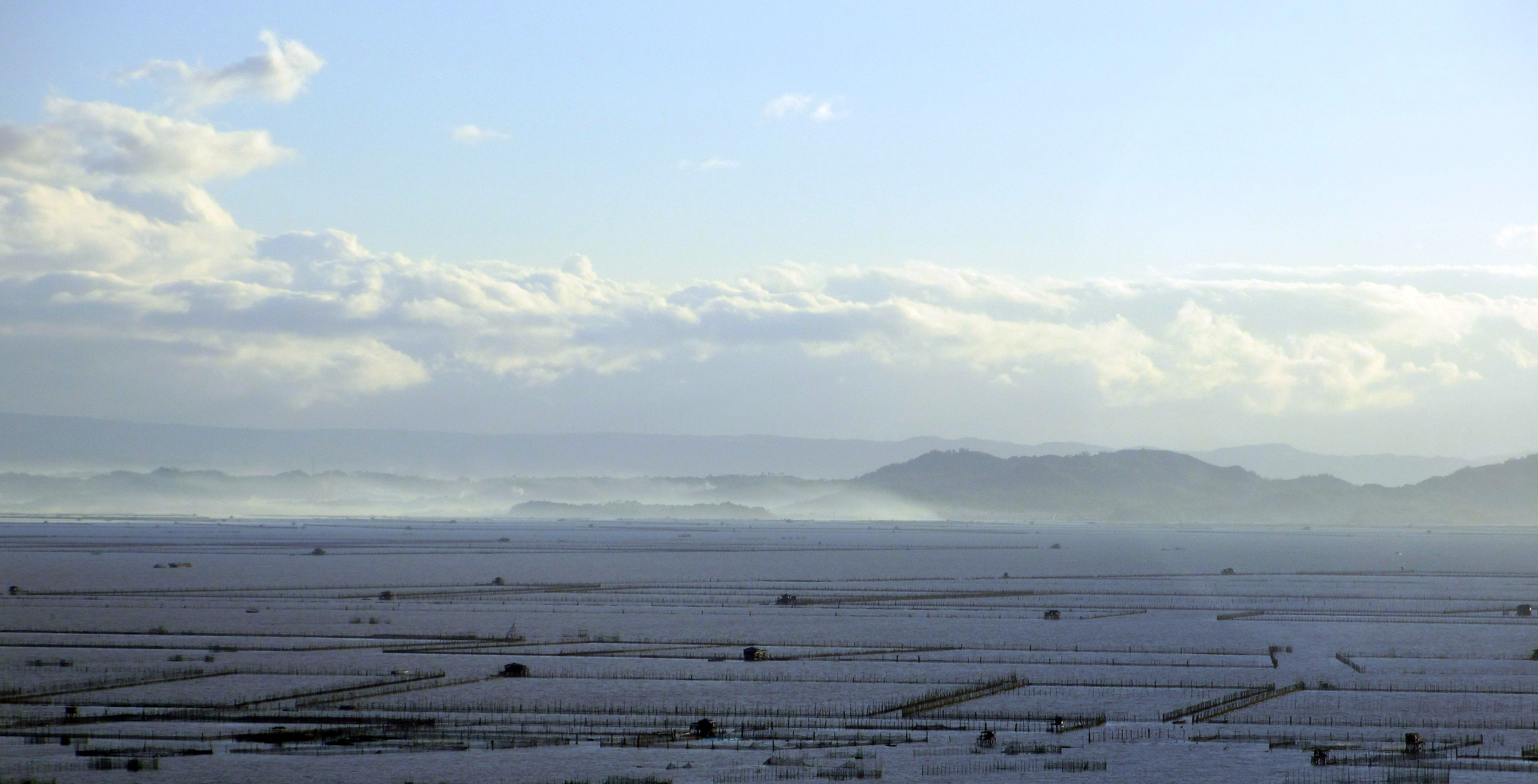
Morning view, Laguna de Bay, from Muntinlupa

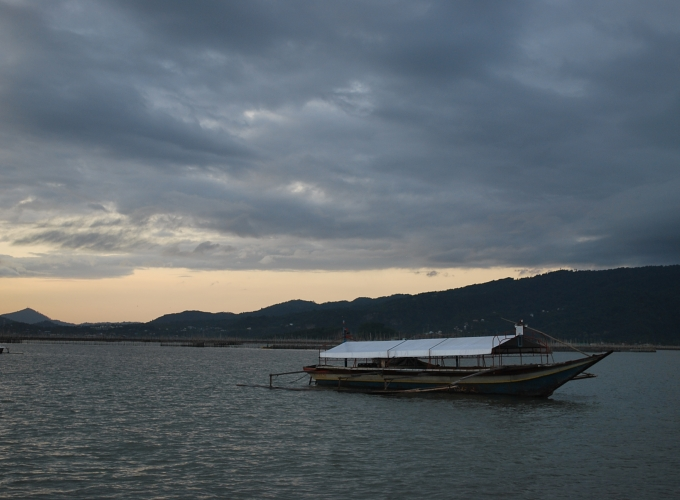
A lakeside in Calamba

The lake is a multipurpose resource, used for fishery, transportation, irrigation of agricultural lands, power generation, and as a reservoir for regional flood management, among other things.

The lake has been used as a navigation lane for passenger boats since the Spanish colonial era. It is also used as a source of water for the Kalayaan Pumped-Storage Hydroelectric Project in Kalayaan, Laguna. Other uses include fishery, aquaculture, recreation, food support for the growing duck industry, irrigation and a "virtual" cistern for domestic, agricultural, and industrial effluents.

On December 15, 2023, Marcos, Jr., assisted by Maynilad president and CEO Ramoncito Fernandez, MWSS administrator, Leonor Cleofas and Manuel Pangilinan inaugurated Maynilad Water Services’s P11-billion Poblacion Water Treatment Plant in Muntinlupa City. The operation and maintenance of the Laguna Lake Drinking Water Treatment Plant was awarded by Maynilad Water Services to Acciona, CEO José Díaz-Caneja, and D.M Consulting Inc.-DMCI Holdings, Inc. It will process 150 million liters of drinking water a day from Laguna de Bay.

== Environmental issues ==
Because of its importance in the development of the Laguna de Bay Region, unlike other lakes in the country, its water quality and general condition are closely monitored. This important water resource has been greatly affected by development pressures like population growth, rapid industrialization, and resource allocation.

=== Invasive species ===
At least 18 fish species are known from Laguna de Bay; none are strictly endemic to the lake, but 3 are endemic to the Philippines: Gobiopterus lacustris, Leiopotherapon plumbeus and Zenarchopterus philippinus. Aquaculture is widespread in Laguna de Bay, but often involves non-native species. Some of these, such as the janitor fish, clown knifefish, Thai catfish, and blackchin tilapia, have escaped and have become invasive species, representing a threat to native fish.

=== Pollution ===
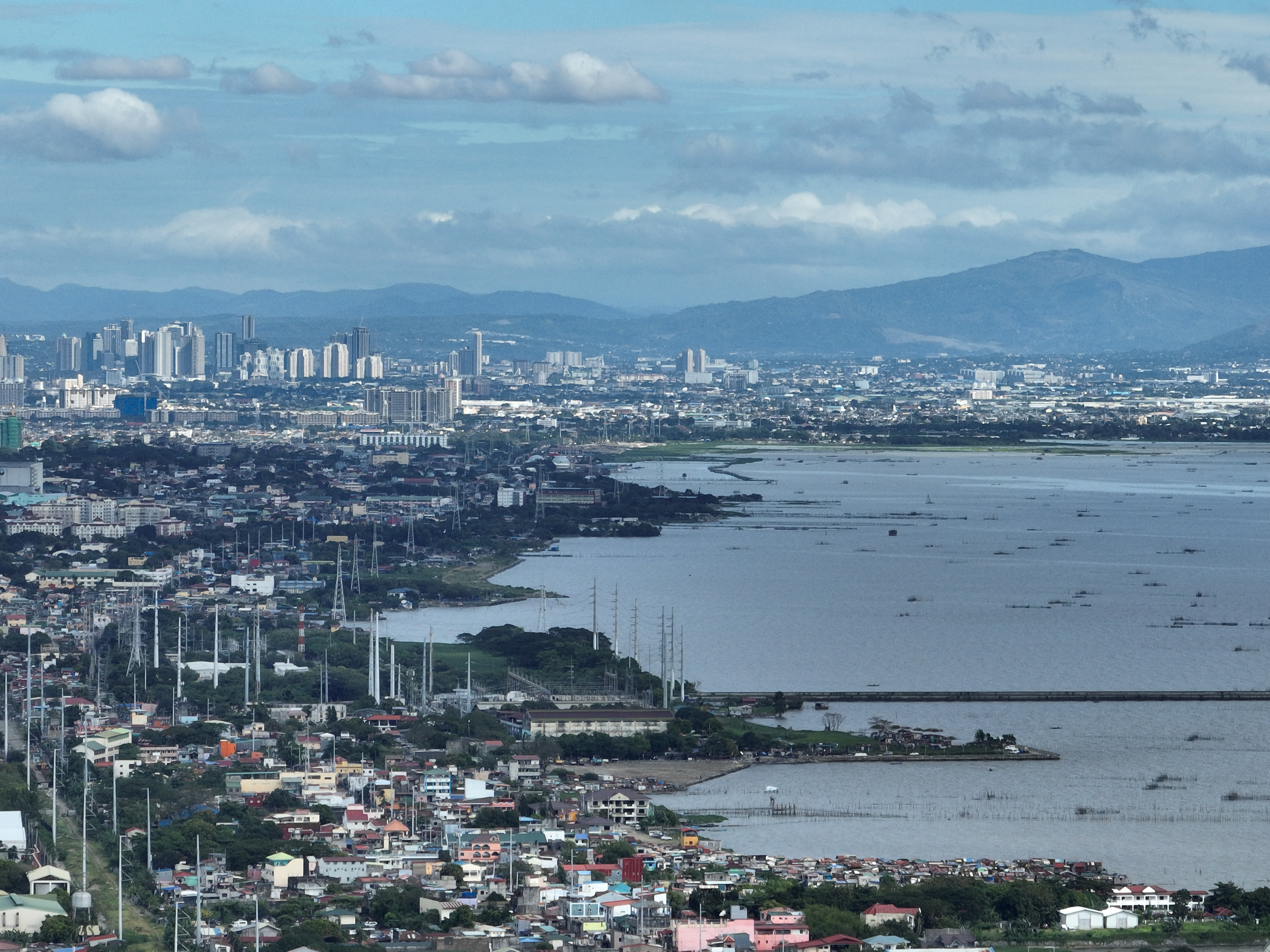
Laguna de Bay's coastline along the highly urbanized cities of Taguig and Muntinlupa

Government data showed that about 60% of the estimated 8.4 million people residing in the Laguna de Bay Region discharge their solid and liquid wastes indirectly to the lake through its tributaries. A large percentage of these wastes are mainly agricultural while the rest are either domestic or industrial According to DENR (1997), domestic and industrial wastes contribute almost equally at 30% each. Meanwhile, agricultural waste takes up the remaining 40%. In a recent sensitivity waste load model ran by the Laguna Lake Development Authority's (LLDA) Integrated Water Resources Management (IWRM) division, it revealed that 70% of biochemical oxygen demand (BOD) loadings came from households, 19% from industries, and 11% came from land run-off or erosion (LLDA, 2005).

As far as industries and factories are concerned, there are about 1,481 and an increase is expected. Of the said figure, about 695 have wastewater treatment facilities. Despite this, the lake is absorbing huge amounts of pollution from these industries in the form of discharges of industrial cooling water, toxic spills from barges and transport operations, and hazardous chemicals like lead, mercury, aluminum and cyanide. Based on the said figure, 65% are classified as "pollutive" industries.

The hastened agricultural modernization throughout the region took its toll on the lake. This paved the way for massive and intensified use of chemical based fertilizers and pesticides whose residues eventually found their way to the lake basin. These chemicals induce rapid algal growth in the area that depletes oxygen levels in the water. Hence, oxygen available to the lake is being used up thereby depleting the available oxygen for the fish, causing massive fish kills. A 2012 study found excessive pesticide use largely attributed to overapplication of pesticides close to waterways.

As far as domestic wastes are concerned, around 10% of the 4,100 metric tons (4,000 long tons; 4,500 short tons) of waste generated by residents of Metro Manila is dumped into the lake, causing siltation of the lake. As reported by the now defunct Metropolitan Manila Waterworks and Sewerage System (MWSS), only 15% of the residents in the area have an effective waste disposal system. Moreover, around 85% of the families living along the shoreline do not have toilets and/or septic tanks.

In 2018 a survey on Microplastics were conducted by researchers from the Polytechnic University of the Philippines, and have found out that the Laguna de Bay is heavily polluted with microplastics. The study involved three (3) barangays and these are Napindan, San Isidro, and Sampiruhan. Among the barangays, Sampiruhan in Calamba, Laguna has the most microplastics, with a median of 15 ranging from 11 to 24 microplastics per 1000 liters of lake water. The data from the conducted survey is available in Mendeley Data.

=== Overfishing ===
On January 29, 2008, the Mamamayan Para sa Pagpapanatili ng Pagpapaunlad ng Lawa ng Laguna (Mapagpala) accused the Laguna Lake Development Authority (LLDA) of the deterioration of Laguna de Bay due to multiplication of fish pens beyond the allowable limit.

== Infrastructure ==
=== Manggahan floodway ===
The Manggahan Floodway is an artificially constructed waterway in Metro Manila, Philippines. The floodway was built in 1986, at a cost of 1.1 billion pesos, in order to reduce flooding along the Pasig River during the rainy season, by diverting the peak water flows of the Marikina River to Laguna de Bay, which serves as a temporary reservoir. If the water level on the lake is higher than the Marikina River, the floodway's flow can be reversed.

By design, the Manggahan Floodway is capable of handling 2,400 cubic meters per second of water flow, although the actual flow is about 2,000 cubic meters per second. To complement the floodway, the Napindan Hydraulic Control System (NHCS) was built in 1983 at the confluence of the Marikina River and the Napindan Channel of the Pasig River to regulate the tidal flow of saline water between Manila Bay and the lake, and to prevent the intrusion of polluted water into the lake.

It has a fully gated diversion dam at its head and was designed with a width of 260 meters (850 ft). Over 40,000 households are situated along the floodway's banks and these shoreline slums have reduced its effective width to 220 meters (720 ft). Kangkong is cultivated extensively in the floodway as well.

The Manggahan Floodway was supposed to function together with the proposed Paranaque Spillway Project, a spillway that would direct flood waters from Laguna de Bay to Manila Bay. However the spillway project was cancelled in 1977 due to budget issues. Since the onslaught of 2009's Typhoon Ketsana (Ondoy), and consistently-reoccurring flooding in the metropolis, the Paranaque Spillway project is being revived, together with the proposed Marikina Dam.

=== Laguna Lakeshore Road Network ===
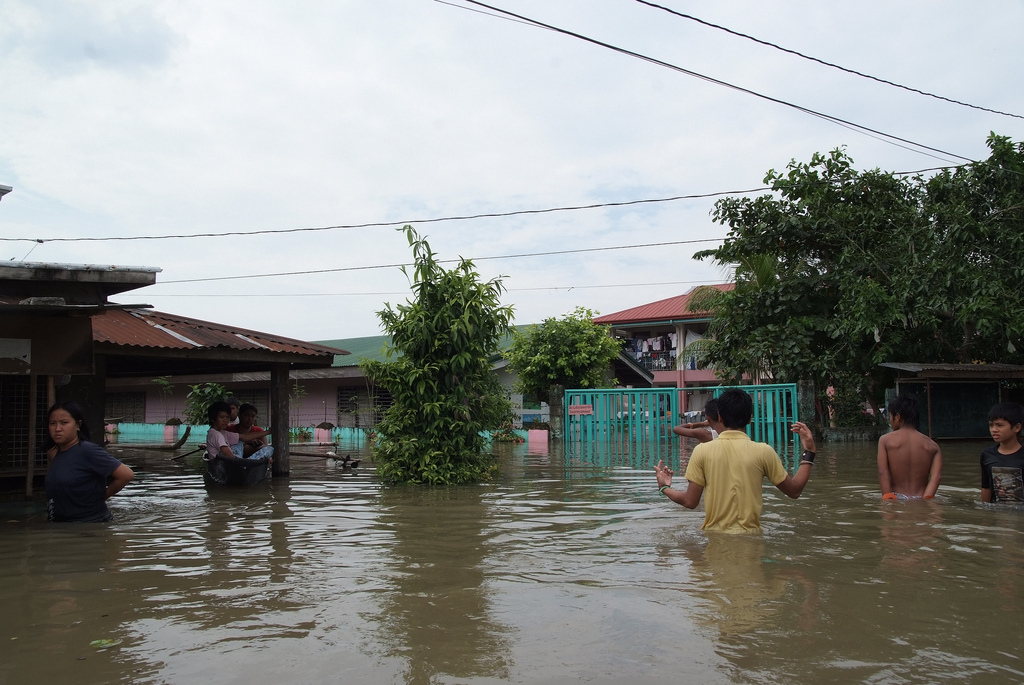
Bay in the Laguna de Bay area, south of Manila, were affected in the aftermath of Typhoon Ketsana. Part of the image collection of the International Rice Research Institute (IRRI)

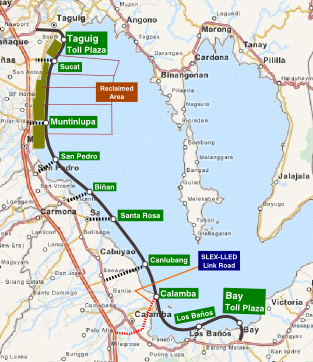
Laguna Lakeshore Expressway Dike

In 1997, a proposed 32.5-kilometer (20.2 mi) limited access highway, the Laguna de Bay Coastal Road, was planned by the joint venture of the Philippine National Construction Corporation, DMCI, John Laing, Filinvest, and the Citra Metro Manila Tollways Corporation (CMMTC; now SMC Skyway Corporation). The alignment would have run between Taytay, Rizal and San Pedro, Laguna.

The Laguna Lakeshore Expressway Dike was proposed in the early 2010s as an expressway in the coastal area of Laguna de Bay in the Philippines, from Taguig in Metro Manila to Calamba and Los Baños in Laguna.

The project will involve the construction of a 47-kilometer-long (29 mi), six-lane dike including bridges, pumping stations and ancillary flood gates.

The project will also involve the reclamation of 700 hectares (1,700 acres) west of and abutting the expressway dike, separated from the shoreline by a 100-to-150-meter (330 to 490 ft) channel in Taguig and Muntinlupa.

The project aims to provide a high-standard highway that will speed up traffic between the southern part of Metro Manila and Laguna and a dike that would mitigate flooding in the western coastal communities along Laguna Lake.

The expressway will cost an estimated ₱36.74 billion (US$854.42 million). When constructed, it is expected to ease traffic congestion along the Muntinlupa and Calamba areas and to serve as a flood control measure for communities on the western shore of Laguna de Bay.

The project was initially conceived as a public-private partnership project, but the project was not successful in receiving bids. The project would later be revised as an untolled highway, known as the Laguna Lakeshore Road Network (LLRN) under a new proposal. The highway project has a total length of about 37.4 kilometers (km) expressway from Lower Bicutan in NCR to Calamba in Laguna Province, consisting of (i) 11.7 km long viaduct from Lower Bicutan to Tunasan; and (ii) 25.7 km long combination of shoreline viaduct and embankment from Tunasan to Calamba. The expressway will be an access-controlled road with eight interchanges, with an access road at each interchange to connect to the existing road networks. The Export-Import Bank of Korea-Economic Development Cooperation Fund (KEXIM-EDCF) and the Asian Development Bank (ADB) will jointly finance the project.

=== Eastbay Submarine Pipeline and Pakil Water Treatment Plant Projects ===
The Manila Water began laying down in 2021 two high density polyethylene (HDPE) underground and 21 km submarine pipes from Binangonan, Cardona, Morong, and Pililla to expand their services under the East Bay Phase 1 Project. These two pipes once completed will deliver 50 million liters per day (MLD) to the said area. The environmental impact of the project was worked on by the University of the Philippines Los Baños.

East Bay Phase 2 Project will involve construction of a water treatment plant (WTP) at Bgy. Kabulusan, Pakil, Laguna beginning 2023. The WTP once completed will produce 200 MLD for the Metro Manila East Zone through the submarine pipeline under the lake.

== Governance ==
The main agency tasked with overseeing the programs that aimed to develop and protect Laguna de Bay is the Laguna Lake Development Authority (LLDA), signed into law under Republic Act (RA) 4850 in 1966 during the Marcos administration. Originally only created as a quasi-government agency with regulatory and proprietary functions, its charter was strengthened by Presidential Decree (PD) 817 in 1975 and by Executive Order (EO) 927 in 1983 to include environmental protection and jurisdiction over the surface waters of the lake basin. In 1993, by virtue of the devolution, the administrative supervision of the LLDA was transferred to the DENR by EO 149.

=== Clean Water Act ===
The technical aspect regarding the quality of wastewater is given in DENR Administrative Order 1990–35. The order defines the critical water parameters' value versus the classification of the body of water (e.g., lake or river). Discharge permits are issued by the LLDA only if the wastewater being discharged complies with the said order.

According to the Clean Water Act of 2004, the DENR (through the LLDA) shall implement a wastewater charge system in all management areas including the Laguna Lake region and Regional Industrial Centers through the collection of wastewater charges/fees. The system shall be established on the basis of payment to the government for discharging wastewater into the water bodies. Wastewater charges shall be established taking into consideration the following: a) to provide strong economic inducement for polluters to modify their production or management processes or to invest in pollution control technology in order to reduce the amount of water pollutants generated; b) to cover the cost of administering water quality management or improvement programs, including the cost of administering the discharge permitting and water pollution charge system; c) reflect damages caused by water pollution on the surrounding environment, including the cost of rehabilitation; d) type of pollutant; e) classification of the receiving water body; and f) other special attributes of the water body.

=== Integrated Coastal Ecosystem Conservation and Adaptive Management ===
CECAM is a 5-year research cooperation between Japanese and Filipino scientists. Seven monitoring instruments are being used as part of the Continuous and Comprehensive Monitoring System (CCMS) provided by the Japanese government.

== Cultural significance ==
Laguna de Bay has had a significant impact on the cultures of communities around its shores, ranging from folk medicine to architecture. For example, the traditional cure for a child’s constant nosebleeds in Victoria would be submerging his or her head in the lake water at daybreak. When nipa huts were more common in the area, these were built of bamboo cured in the waters of Laguna de Bay. Some experts on the evolution of local mythologies have suggested the legend of Mariang Makiling may have begun with the Lady (Ba'i) of Laguna de Bay, before the character was transferred instead to Mount Makiling.

== See also ==
- Laguna Lake Development Authority
- Laguna Lakeshore Expressway Dike
- Rehabilitation of the Pasig River

== Sources ==
- Laguna Lake Development Authority, LLDA (2009). "2009 Annual Report".
- Laguna Lake Development Authority, LLDA (1995). "Laguna de Bay Master Plan – Final Report".
