= Calamba Island =

Island in Laguna, Philippines

Coordinates: 14.2186°N 121.2049°E

- Wonder Island Calamba
- Type: Island, Water park
- Location: Aplaya-Brgy. Lingga, Calamba, Laguna, Philippines
- Created: 2004 complete
- Operator: Laguna Government
- Status: complete

Calamba Island (popularly known as Wonder Island Resort), also known as Wonder Island Calamba, is an island resort in Calamba, Laguna, situated in the middle of Laguna de Bay. Calamba Island is one of the tourist resorts of the city, located 54 kilometers (34 mi) south of Metro Manila. This island is part of barangays Lingga and Palingon.
