= Ulot River =

River in Samar, Philippines

- Location within Visayas Location within Philippines

Location
- Country: Philippines
- Region: Eastern Visayas
- Provinces: Eastern Samar; Samar

Physical characteristics
- Source
  - location: San Jose de Buan
- Mouth
  - location: Can-avid
  - coordinates: 11°59′42″N 125°27′14″E
- Length: 90 km (56 mi)

The Ulot River is the longest river in Samar, the third largest island in the Philippines. The river runs from San Jose de Buan in the Samar Province and discharges into the Philippine Sea. It has a length of approximately 90 kilometres (56 mi).
