= Silmugi River =

River in Cebu, Philippines

- Silmugi River mouth Silmugi River (Philippines)

Location
- Country: Philippines
- Region: Central Visayas
- Province: Cebu
- City/municipality: Borbon

Physical characteristics
- Mouth: Camotes Sea
  - location: Borbon
  - coordinates: 10°50′28″N 124°02′01″E

The Silmugi River is a river in the municipality of Borbon in Cebu province in the Philippines.

Borbon has sought to develop the river into an eco-tourism site.
