= Morong River =

Morong River Morong–Teresa River
- Location within Luzon Location within Philippines
- Native name: Ilog ng Morong (Tagalog)

Location
- Country: Philippines
- Region: Calabarzon
- Province: Rizal
- City/municipality: Antipolo; Teresa; Morong

Physical characteristics
- Source: Antipolo, Rizal
- Mouth: Laguna de Bay
  - location: Northern tip of the middle lobe of Laguna de Bay
  - coordinates: 14°30′12″N 121°15′14″E
  - elevation: < 2 m (6.6 ft) above sea level
- Length: 10 km (6.2 mi)
- Basin size: 70.21 km^{2} (27.11 sq mi)

Basin features
- Progression: Morong River–Laguna de Bay

The Morong River (Filipino: Ilog ng Morong), also known as the Morong–Teresa River, is a river system in Rizal, Philippines. It is one of 21 major tributaries of Laguna de Bay. It covers 14 barangays and stretches 10 kilometres (6.2 mi) from Antipolo down to Teresa, Morong and finally to Laguna de Bay.

The Morong River sub-basin has a drainage area of 70.21 square kilometres (27.11 sq mi).

On 1991, a study noted that eutrophication in Laguna de Bay could be attributed to nutrients brought to the lake as a result of the tremendous deterioration of the Morong River and the San Pedro River. In the case of the Morong River, this increase was said to be a result of draining effluents from hog farms.

A 1994 cleanup drive initiated by the Laguna Lake Development Authority in cooperation with the local communities and local government units of Antipolo, Morong, and Teresa removed some seven truckloads of garbage and cleared a three-kilometre (1.9 mi) portion of the river from water lilies blocking the waterway.

== See also ==
- Laguna de Bay
- Laguna Lake Development Authority
