= Laguna Lake Development Authority =

Philippine government agency

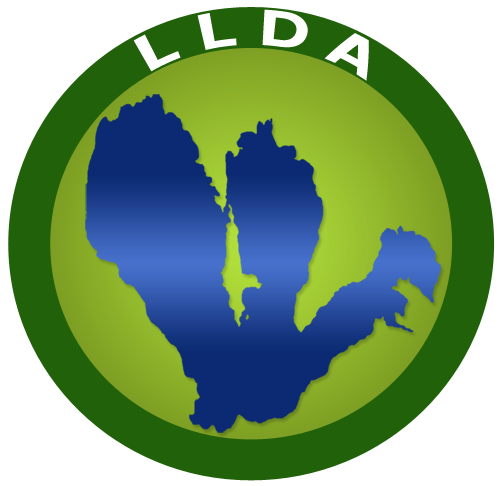

Agency overview
- Formed: October 22, 1969; 56 years ago
- Jurisdiction: Laguna de Bay and its 21 major tributary rivers
- Headquarters: LLDA Green Building, National Ecology Center, East Avenue, Diliman, Quezon City, Philippines
- Parent department: Department of Environment and Natural Resources
- Website: llda.gov.ph

The Laguna Lake Development Authority (LLDA), (Note: Filipino: Awtoridad sa Pagpapaunlad ng Laguna de Bay; abbreviation by APLB; uncommon in use) one of the attached agencies of the Department of Environment and Natural Resources (DENR), is responsible for the preservation, development, and sustainability of Laguna de Bay (Laguna Lake) and its 21 major tributary rivers.

The Laguna Lake Development Authority was created by virtue of Republic Act No. 4850 (as amended by Presidential Decree No. 813).

Since 1993, the LLDA has been attached to the DENR pursuant to Executive Order No. 149 for administrative supervision and policy alignment.

== History ==
The Laguna Lake Development Authority (LLDA) was established in 1966 as a quasi-government agency that leads, promotes, and accelerates sustainable development in the Laguna de Bay Region. Regulatory and law-enforcement functions are carried out with provisions on environmental management, particularly on water quality monitoring, conservation of natural resources, and community-based natural resource management.

The LLDA on August 7, 2009, approved the water permit application of Maynilad to allow the West Zone concessionaire to abstract 100 million liters per day of lake water to be made available for domestic consumption. Maynilad started the production of 50 MLD in June 2010 and expects to produce 100 MLD by September same year.

== Jurisdiction ==
The jurisdiction of the Laguna Lake Development Authority is defined by Republic Act No. 4850. The area, known as the Laguna de Bay Region, covers an area of 3,880 square kilometers (1,500 sq mi). It includes the following.

Batangas

- Tanauan
- Malvar
- Santo Tomas

Cavite

- Silang
- Carmona
- General Mariano Alvarez
- Tagaytay

Laguna

- 6 Cities
- 24 Municipalities

Metro Manila

- Caloocan
- Manila
- Marikina
- Muntinlupa
- Quezon City
- Pasay
- Pasig
- Pateros
- Taguig

Rizal

- 1 City
- 13 Municipalities

Quezon

- Lucban

The LLDA covers Laguna de Bay and its drainage basin. The area has 24 sub-basins and 100 river and streams which serves as tributaries. It has 22 major river system, one of which is the Pasig River.

== Programs ==
- Environmental User's Fee
- Shoreland Management
- Implementation of the Zoning and Management Plan (ZOMAP)
- River Rehabilitation

=== Environmental Management Program ===
LLDA supervises systems and programs such as Environmental User Fee System (EUFS), Public Disclosure Program (PDP), the Appropriation and Utilization of Surface Waters (Surface Waters) for the management of the lake waters and tributaries that flow into the lake, to ensure their proper use and maintenance for the sustainability of the ecosystem.

==== The Environmental User Fee System ====
To realize the objectives of the creation of LLDA, the agency implemented policies to curb the possibility of stressing the lake's assimilative capacity. The most recent policy was the Environmental User Fee System (EUFS). The EUFS was implemented by virtue of LLDA Board Resolution 22 in 1996. The objective of the policy was to "…(reduce) the pollution loading in to the Laguna de Bay by enjoining all discharges of liquid wastes to internalize the cost of environmental degradation…". Formally, the said board resolution defined the EUFS as a "market–based" policy instrument aimed at reducing the pollution loading in the lake. As such, companies found to have unusually high concentration of pollutants in their emissions, need to pay fines or lake "user–fees".

The system encourages companies to invest in and operate pollution prevention and/or abatement systems in their establishment. Applying the "polluter pays principle", the system effects direct accountability for damage inflicted on the integrity of the Laguna de Bay region thereby encouraging individuals and business establishments to internalize into their decision-making process the environmental impacts of their day-to-day activities. The EUFS covers all enterprises in the administrative jurisdiction of LLDA that discharge wastewater in the Laguna de Bay system. These include commercial and industrial establishments; agro-based industries and establishments (such as swine farms and slaughterhouses); clustered dwellings (i.e., residential subdivisions); and domestic households.

Under the EUFS, a firm is required to secure a discharge permit which is renewed annually at the LLDA. The discharge permit allows the firm to discharge its wastewater to the lake or through its main tributaries. The discharge permit gives the establishment a legal right to dispose their waste water in the Laguna de Bay region. Wastewater is basically sewage, storm water, and water used around the community, including firms.

Domestic wastewater includes black water, or wastewater from toilets, and gray water, which is wastewater from all sources except toilets. Black water and gray water have different characteristics, but both contain pollutants and disease-causing agents that require monitoring. Nondomestic wastewater is generated by offices, businesses, department stores, restaurants, schools, hospitals, farms, manufacturers, and other commercial, industrial, and institutional entities. Storm water is a nonresidential source and carries trash and other pollutants from streets, as well as pesticides and fertilizers from yards and fields.

== See also ==
- Laguna de Bay
- Bureau of Lands Management
- Department of Environment and Natural Resources
- National Mapping and Resource Information Authority
- National Water Resources Board
