= San Cristóbal =

San Cristóbal, Spanish for Saint Christopher, may refer to:

== Places ==
=== Argentina ===
- San Cristóbal, Santa Fe
- San Cristóbal, Buenos Aires, a neighborhood (barrio)

=== Bolivia ===
- San Cristóbal mine (Bolivia), a silver, zinc and lead mine

=== Chile ===
- San Cristóbal Hill, a hill and public park in Santiago
- San Cristóbal de La Paz, a former fortress

=== Colombia ===
- San Cristóbal, Bogotá
- San Cristóbal, Bolívar

=== Cuba ===
- San Cristóbal, Cuba, in the province of Artemisa
- Havana, founded as Villa de San Cristóbal de la Habana

=== Dominican Republic ===
- San Cristóbal Province
- San Cristóbal, Dominican Republic

=== Ecuador ===
- San Cristóbal Island, an island in the Galápagos
- San Cristóbal Canton, surrounding the island

=== El Salvador ===
- San Cristóbal, Cuscatlán

=== Guatemala ===
- Ciudad San Cristóbal, a neighbourhood in the city of Mixco
- San Cristóbal Acasaguastlán
- San Cristóbal Cucho
- San Cristóbal Totonicapán
- San Cristóbal Verapaz

=== Mexico ===
- San Cristóbal de las Casas, Chiapas
- San Cristóbal Amatlán, Oaxaca
- San Cristóbal Amoltepec, Oaxaca
- San Cristóbal Ecatepec
  - San Cristóbal (Mexibús, Line 2), a BRT station in Ecatepec de Morelos, Mexico
  - San Cristóbal (Mexibús, Line 4), a BRT station in Ecatepec de Morelos, Mexico
- San Cristóbal Lachirioag, Oaxaca
- San Cristóbal Suchixtlahuaca, Oaxaca

=== Nicaragua ===
- San Cristóbal Volcano

=== Panama ===
- Cristóbal Island, Bocas del Torro Province
- Estadio San Cristóbal, a stadium in Chiriquí Province

=== Paraguay ===
- San Cristóbal (Asunción)
- San Cristóbal District, Paraguay

=== Peru ===
- San Cristóbal District, Luya, a district in the Amazonas Region

=== Philippines ===
- Mount San Cristobal
- San Cristobal River

=== Puerto Rico ===
- San Cristóbal (Puerto Rico), a sector in San Juan

=== Solomon Islands ===
- San Cristóbal or Makira, an island

=== Spain ===
- San Cristóbal (Madrid), a neighbourhood
  - San Cristóbal (Madrid Metro), a metro station
- San Cristóbal, Cantabria, a town
- San Cristóbal (Oscos), a parish in Villanueva de Oscos, Asturias
- San Cristóbal de La Laguna, a suburban area of Santa Cruz de Tenerife (province)
- Fort San Cristóbal (Spain), a fort in Navarre
- San Cristóbal Lighthouse, a lighthouse on La Gomera, Canary Islands

=== United States ===
- San Cristobal, New Mexico, a census-designated place in Taos County

=== Venezuela ===
- San Cristóbal, Táchira

== Other uses ==
- San Cristóbal (volleyball club), Dominican Republic
- San Cristobal de la Habana (cigar), a brand of Cuban cigars
- Cristóbal Carbine, an automatic rifle

== See also ==
- Cristóbal
- Castillo San Cristóbal (disambiguation)
