= Cristóbal =

Cristóbal or Cristobal, the Spanish version of Christopher, is a masculine given name and a surname which may refer to:

== Given name ==
- Cristóbal Balenciaga (1895–1972), Spanish fashion designer
- Cristóbal Cobo (born 1976), Chilean academic
- Cristóbal Colón Ruiz (born 1954), Puerto Rican politician
- Cristóbal de Morales (1500–1553), Spanish composer
- Cristóbal de Olid (1487–1524), Spanish conquistador
- Cristobal C. Duenas (1920–2010), Guamanian lawyer and judge of the District Court of Guam
- Cristóbal Halffter (1930–2021), Spanish composer
- Cristóbal Lander (born 1978), Venezuelan actor and model
- Cristóbal López (disambiguation), multiple people
- Cristobal Lorente, (born 1996), Spanish boxer
- Cristóbal Magallanes Jara (1869–1927), Mexican martyr and Catholic saint
- Cristóbal Márquez Crespo (born 1984), Cuban association football player known as simply Cristóbal
- Cristóbal Mendoza (1772–1829), Venezuelan president
- Cristóbal Orellana (born 1983), Mexican actor and singer
- Cristóbal Ortega (1956–2025), Mexican footballer
- Cristóbal Oudrid (1825–1877), Spanish composer
- Cristóbal Parralo (born 1967), Cuban association football player known as simply Cristóbal
- Cristóbal Pérez (born 1952), Colombian cyclist
- Cristóbal Rojas (disambiguation), multiple people
- Cristobal Tapia de Veer (born 1973), Chilean-Canadian composer and producer

== Surname ==
- Adrian Cristobal (1932–2007), Filipino writer
- Carmen Lelia Cristóbal (1932–2019), Argentinian professor of botany
- Everardo Cristóbal (born 1986), Mexican sprint canoeist
- Geronimo Cristobal (born 1986), Filipino writer, art critic
- Mario Cristobal (born 1970), American football coach

== Fictional characters ==
- Cristóbal Junta (Russian: Кристобаль Хунта, romanized: Kristobal Khunta) in Monday Begins on Saturday

== See also ==
- San Cristóbal
