= Light and Space Contemporary =

- Established: 2010
- Location: Metro Manila, Philippines
- Type: Art gallery
- Key holdings: Joseph Tecson, Jason Tecson, Rodel Tapaya, Oca Villamiel, Lao Lianben, Jigger Cruz, Roberto Chabet, Ernest Concepcion
- Founder: Jason Tecson
- Curator: Geronimo Cristobal (2011-2015)

Light and Space Contemporary is an artist-run art gallery in Metro Manila, Philippines founded in 2010 by Jason Tecson whose family generously committed their former warehouses and offices in Quezon City, Philippines for the establishment of an art gallery.

== History ==
Since its founding, the principal focus of the gallery is the representation of young and contemporary artists whose diverse practices include painting, drawing, sculpture, installation, and photography. Light and Space Contemporary hosted art exhibitions alongside musical performances, stage plays, and special film screenings. Through its partnerships with other institutions, Light and Space accommodated artists working in different territories through an artist-in-residence program. Resident artists have played an important role in organizing exhibitions and in extending the network of the institution. The gallery offers other services aligned with its goal to be a venue for creative dialogue and a laboratory in stimulating artistic innovation such as fabrication and printing services specialized for artistic purposes.

== Artists ==
The gallery was founded by sculptor Jason Tecson with painters Pow Martinez, Jeona Zoleta, and Sam Kiyoumarsi. From 2012-2016, Geronimo Cristobal and Jason Tecson served as directors of the art gallery which briefly opened a space in The Fort, Bonifacio Global City, in Taguig. A number of artists exhibited and held studios at its premises. They include Jigger Cruz, Gino Bueza, Julius Redillas, Issay Rodriguez, Herbert Soltys, and Cian Dayrit. The gallery organized exhibitions for Oca Villamiel and Ernest Concepcion at the Jorge B. Vargas Museum and Filipiniana Research Center. Roberto Chabet and Rodel Tapaya donated some of their works to help raise funds for the artist-run space.

== Reception ==
Solo and group exhibitions mounted at Light and Space Contemporary have received critical attention in the Philippine Daily Inquirer and the Philippine Star as well as art-focused publications such as ArtAsiaPacific magazine and Art Review.
