= Castillo San Cristóbal =

Castillo San Cristóbal may refer to:

- Castillo San Cristóbal (San Juan), Puerto Rico
- Castle of San Cristóbal (Santa Cruz de Tenerife), Canary Islands, Spain
- Fort San Cristóbal (Spain), Navarre

== See also ==
- San Cristóbal (disambiguation)
- San Cristóbal de La Paz, a former fortress in Chile
