= Mount Macolod =

Dormant stratovolcano in the Philippines

- Mount Maculot
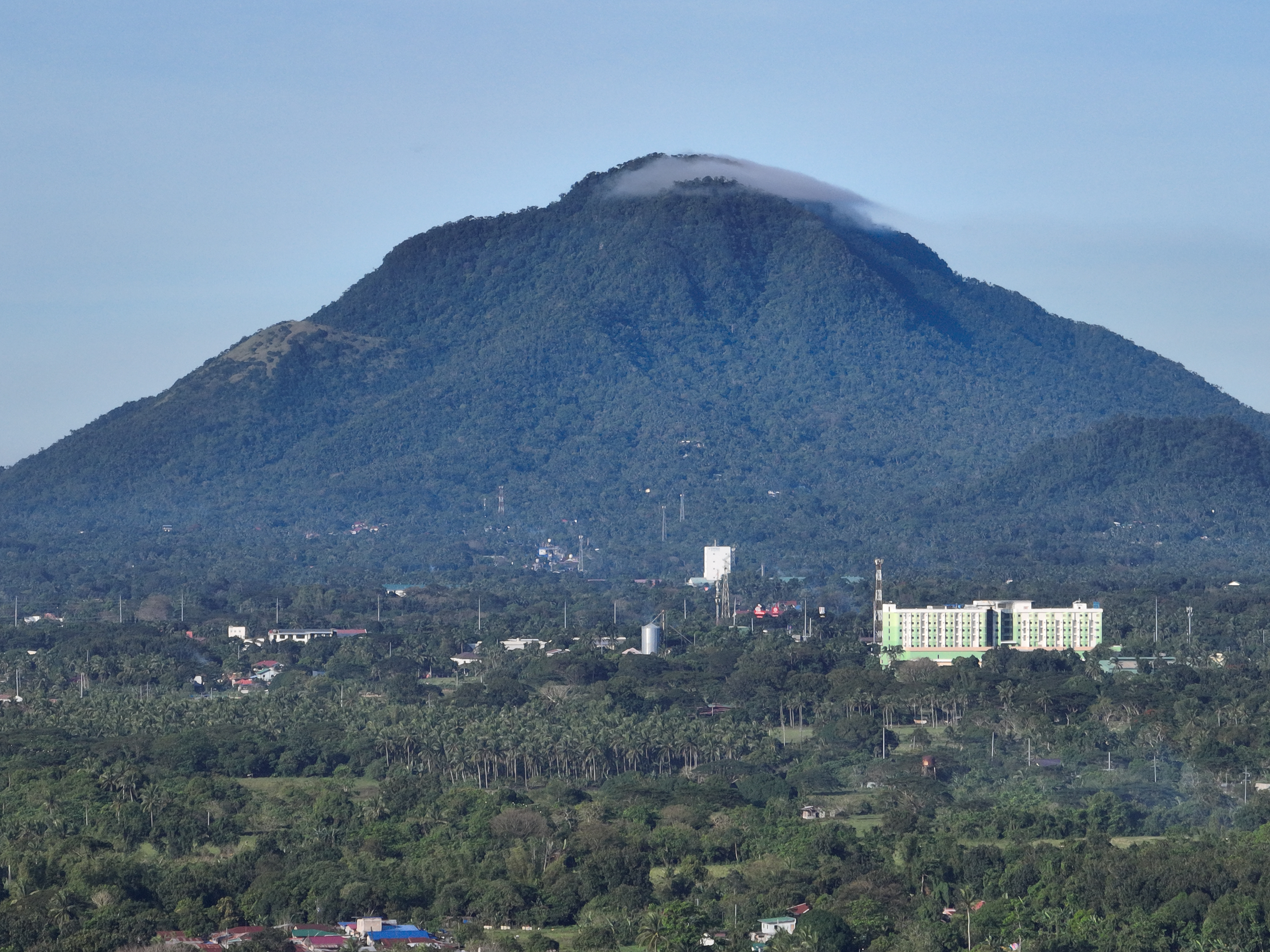
- Mount Maculot, view from Lipa, Batangas

Highest point
- Elevation: 957 m (3,140 ft)
- Prominence: 609 m (1,998 ft)
- Coordinates: 13°55′N 121°03′E

Geography
- Location within Luzon Location within Philippines
- An interactive map of Mount Macolod (large brown marker) and Taal Caldera (red marker).
- Country: Philippines
- Region: Calabarzon
- Province: Batangas
- City/municipality: Cuenca

Geology
- Mountain type: Flank Stratovolcano of Taal
- Volcanic zone: Macolod Corridor
- Last eruption: Unknown

Climbing
- Easiest route: from Cuenca town center

Mount Macolod (other spelling: Maculot) is a flank dormant stratovolcano of Taal Volcano located in the municipality of Cuenca, Batangas in the Philippines. Popular with mountain climbers and campers, it is the main tourist attraction of Cuenca.

The mountain is sacred to both Christians and Anitists. Every year on Holy Week, thousands of pilgrims from nearby towns and provinces climb the mountain as a form of penance.

== Geography ==
The mountain is about 947 meters (3,107 ft) tall and is also located adjacent to Taal Lake. Mount Macolod and its 700-meter (2,300 ft) high volcanic rock wall called The Rockies are said to be part of Taal Caldera's crater rim. It is likely a pre caldera cone of the Taal volcanic system.

== Geological history ==
Based on studies on Taal, it is believed that the caldera was formed by buildup of large volume dacitic to andesitic pyroclastic materials. Several major catastrophic eruptions probably between 670,000 and 6,000 years ago caused the collapse of the 25-by-30-kilometre (16 mi × 19 mi) wide Taal Caldera. This caldera was filled by water, thus forming a flooded caldera system. The younger Volcano Island was formed by numerous explosive hydrovolcanic eruptions in the middle of the lake after the collapse.

The slopes of the previous volcano now formed ridges surrounding the lake. Mount Macolod is not only a volcanic cone on the south side but also the highest caldera rim of the former Taal Cone. Tagaytay Ridge, to the north, is the northern rim of the caldera with Mount Sungay its highest elevation.

== Gallery ==
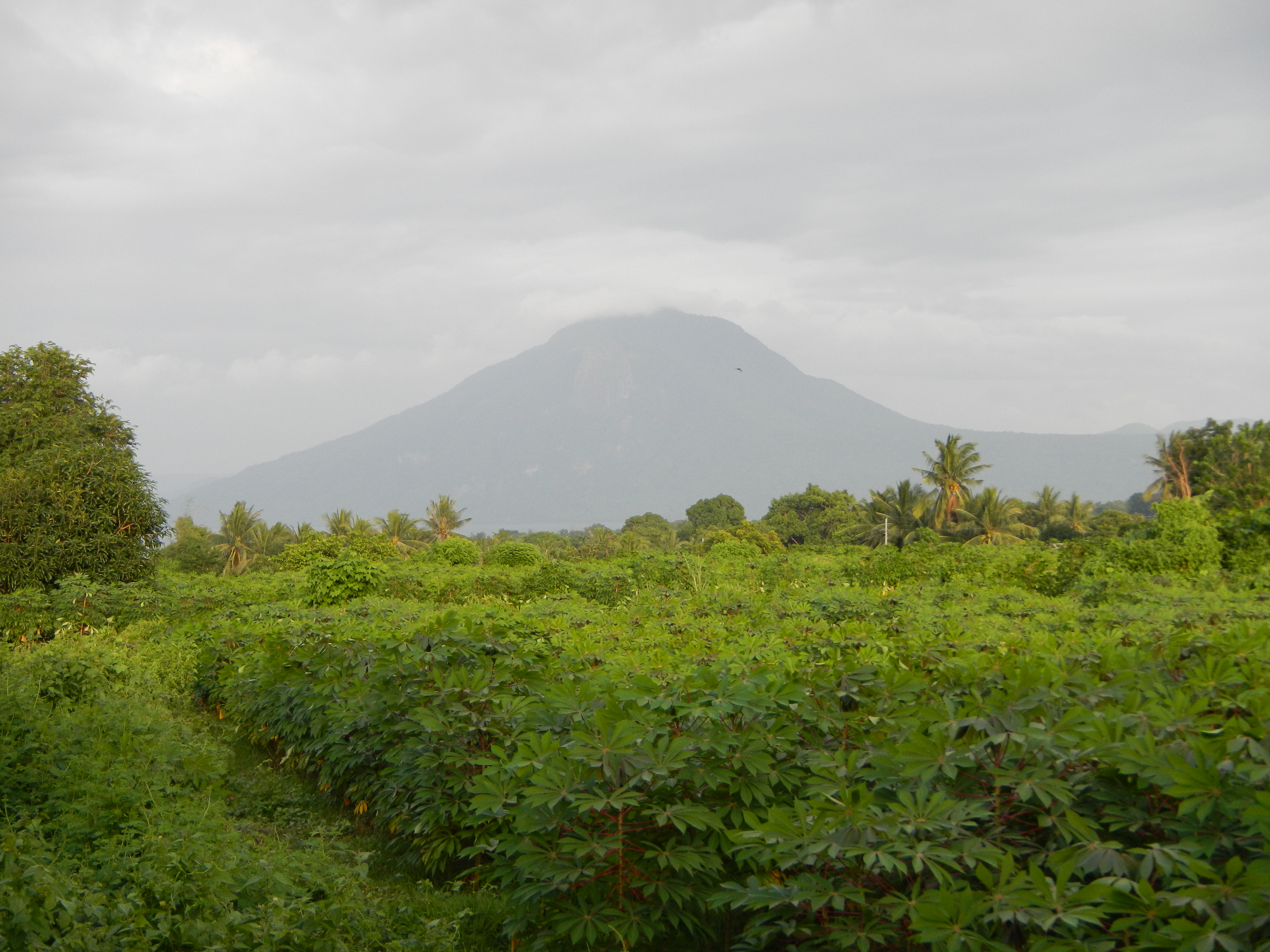
View from San Nicolas

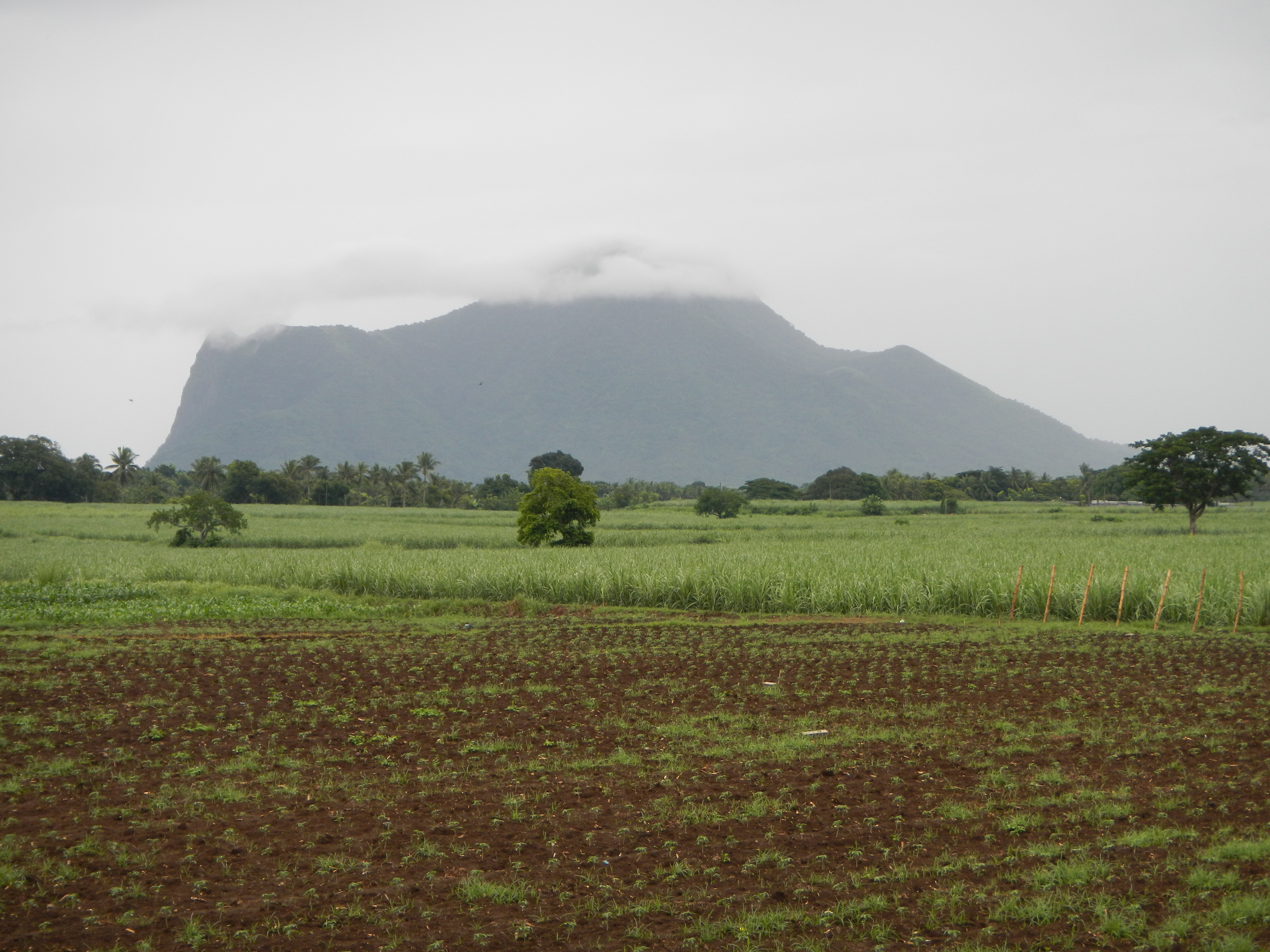
View from Cuenca

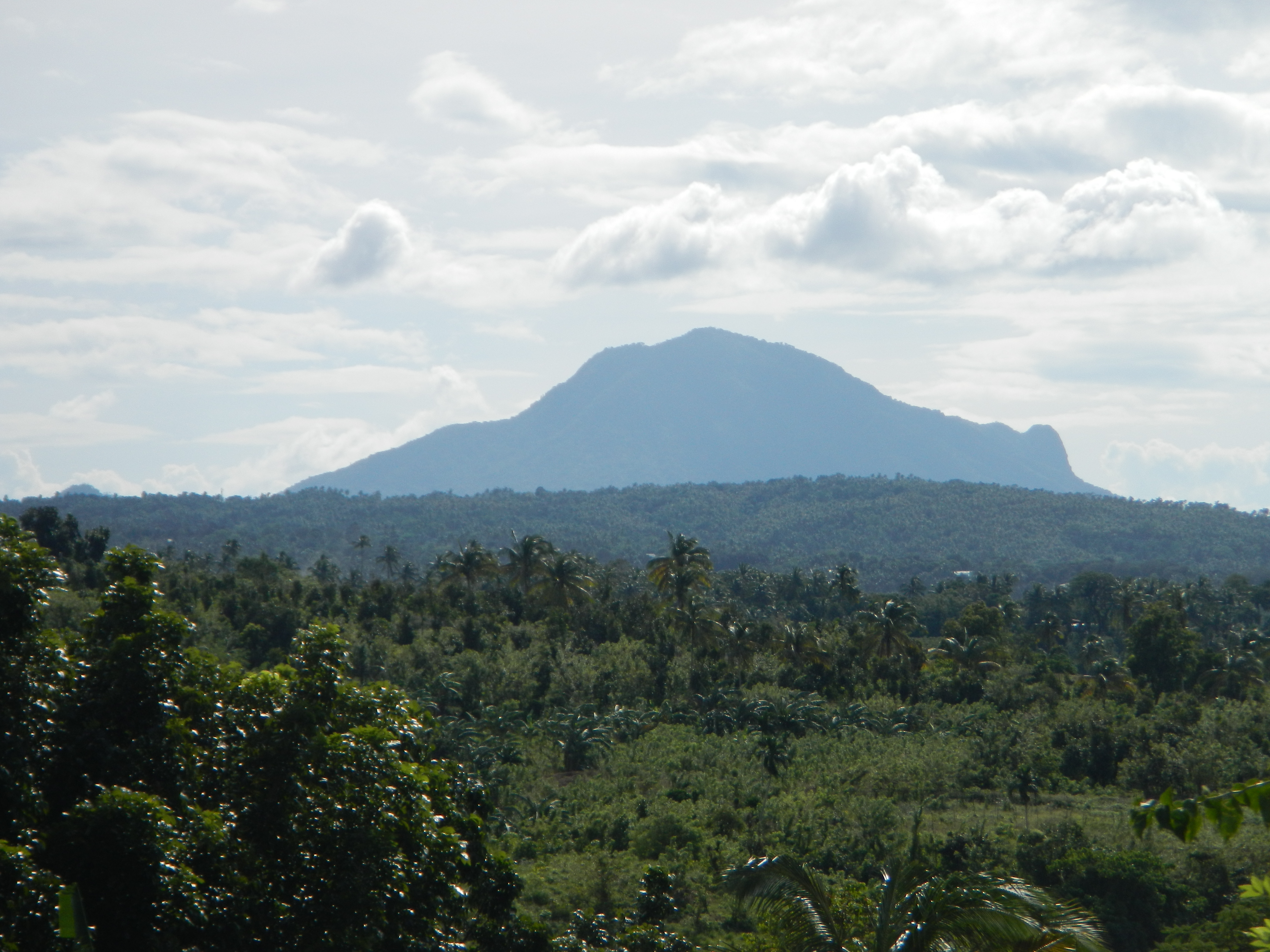
View from Balete

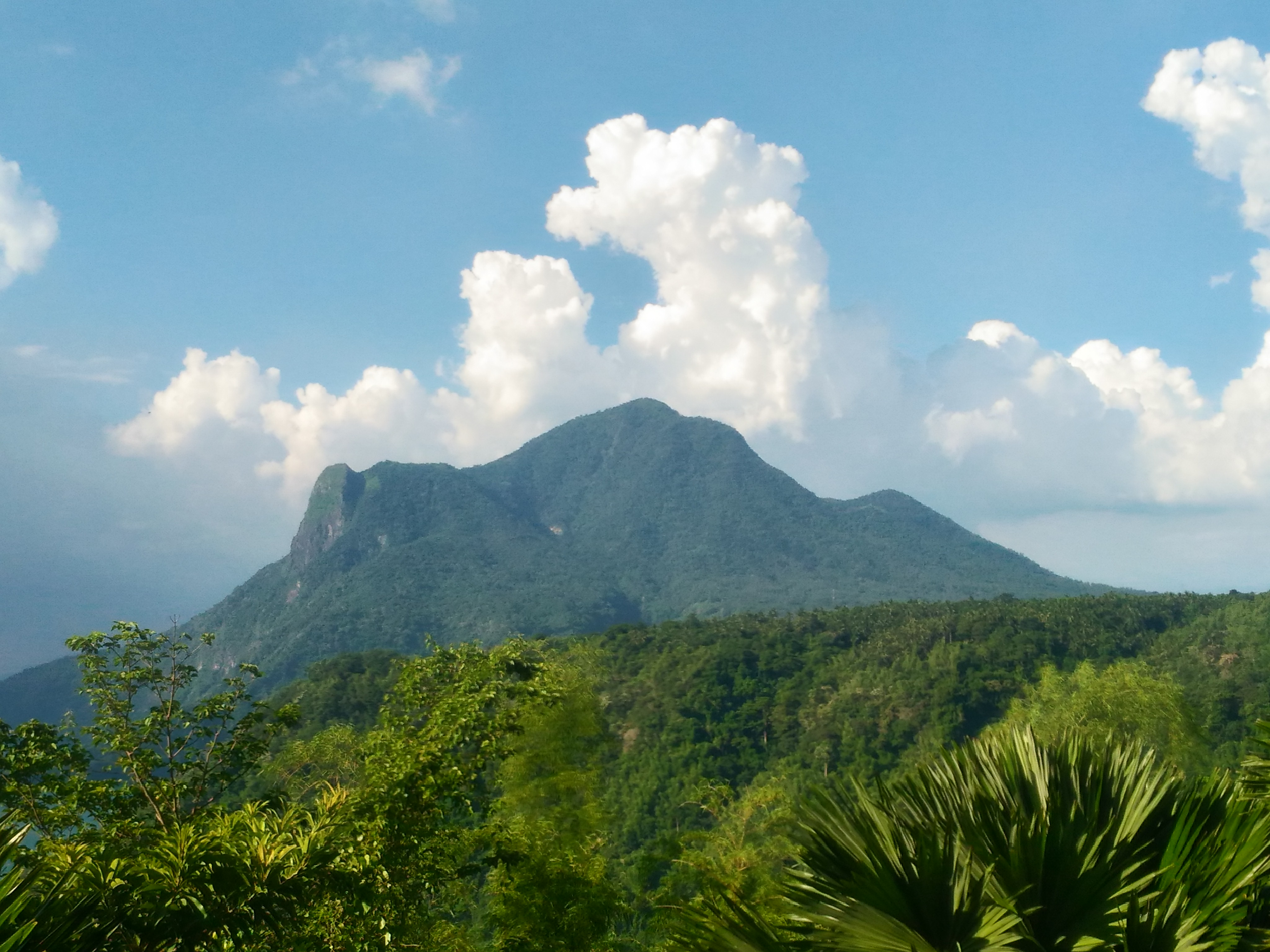
View from Alitagtag

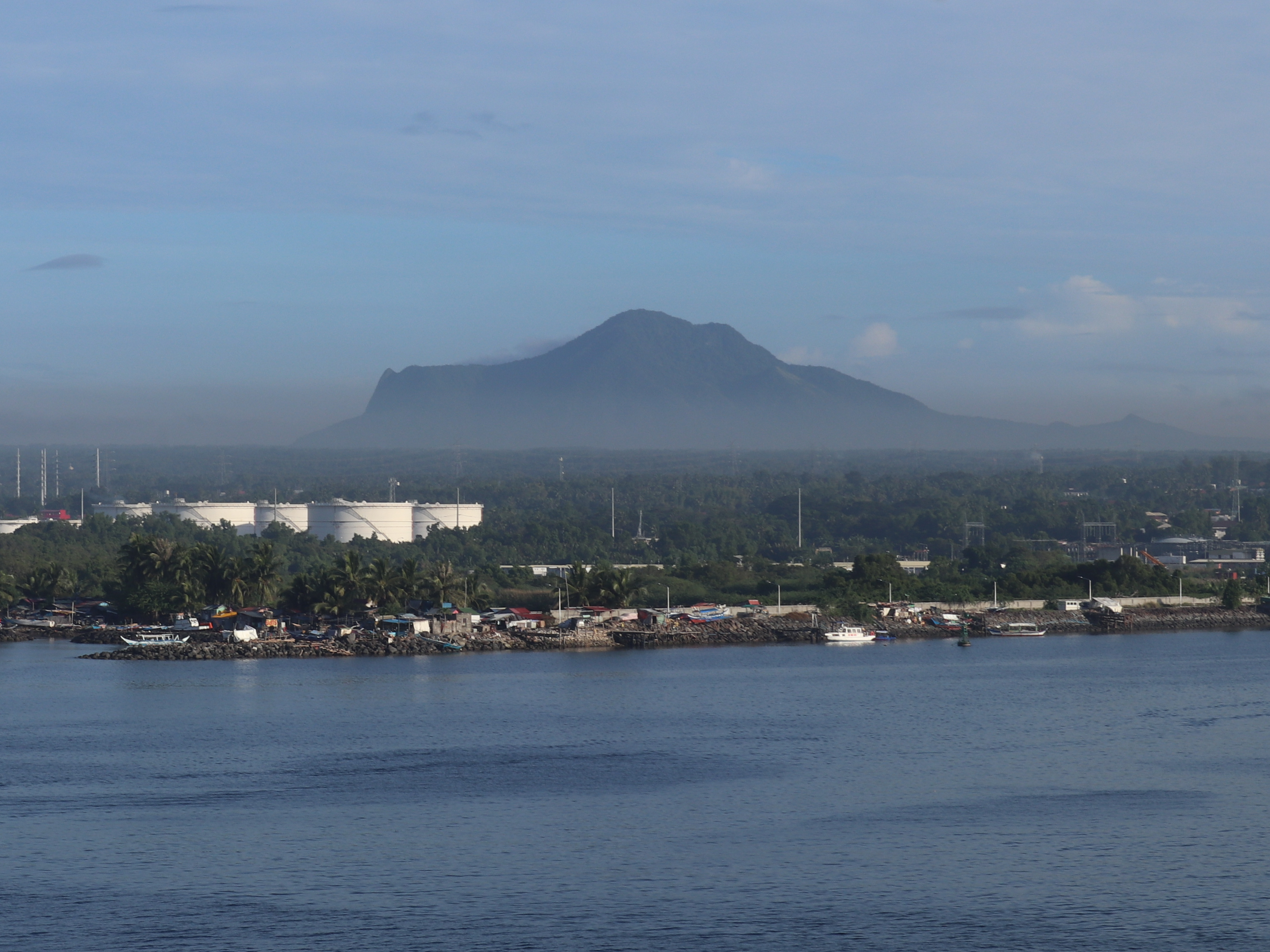
View from Batangas Bay

== See also ==
- List of mountains in the Philippines
