= Mount Sungay =

Volcanic mountain in Cavite, Philippines

- Mount Gonzales
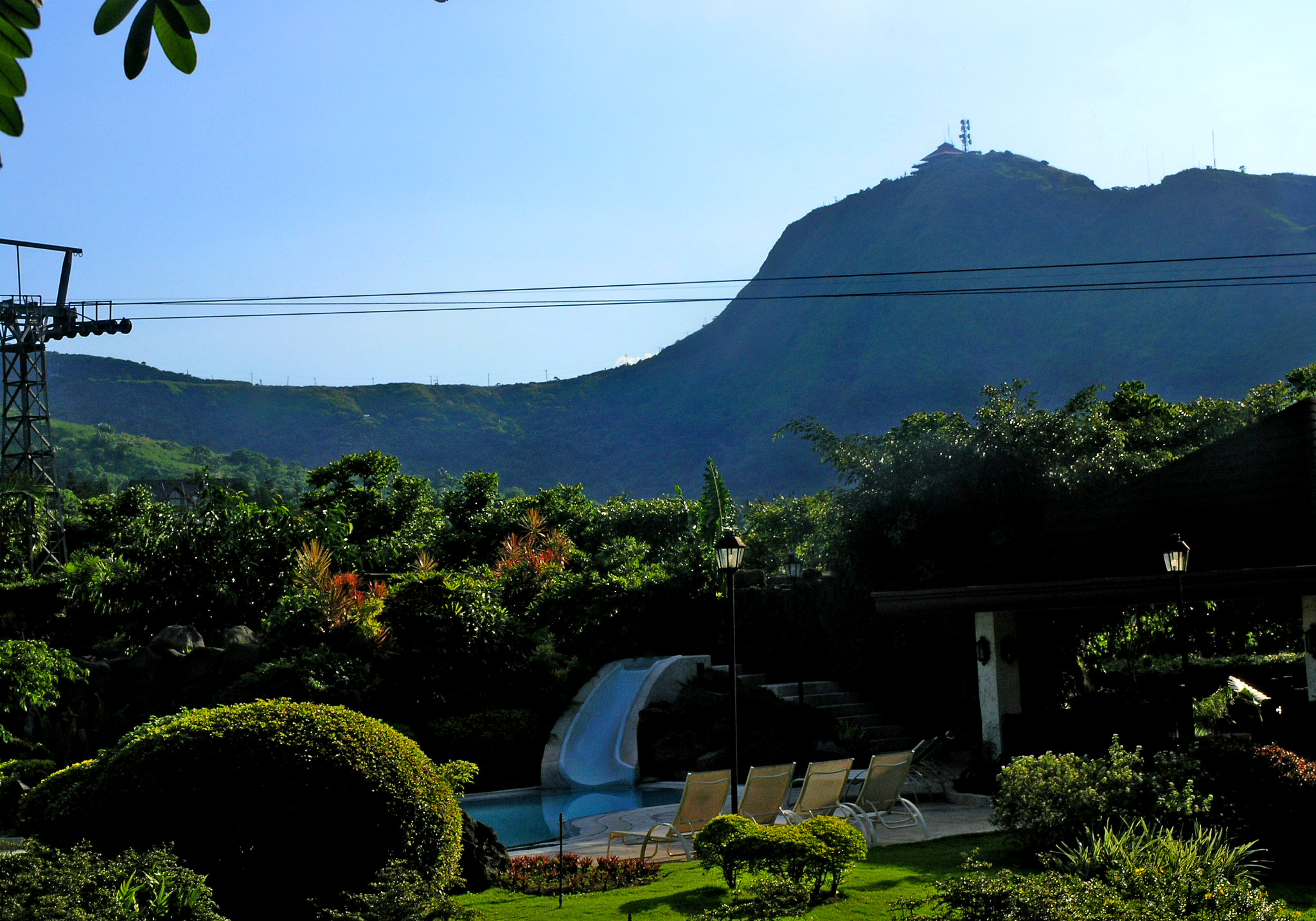
- The mountain as seen from the nearby Tagaytay Highlands

Highest point
- Elevation: 709 m (2,326 ft)
- Listing: Inactive volcanoes
- Coordinates: 14°08′32″N 121°01′19″E

Geography
- Location within Luzon Location within Philippines
- An interactive map of Taal Caldera (large red marker) with associated volcanic cones mentioned in text (small brown markers) Location in Luzon##Location in the Philippines
- Country: Philippines
- Region: Calabarzon
- Province: Cavite
- City: Tagaytay
- Parent range: Tagaytay Ridge

Geology
- Mountain type: Stratovolcano
- Volcanic zone: Macolod Corridor
- Last eruption: Unknown

Climbing
- Easiest route: By car and a short hike to the summit

Mount Sungay, also known as Mount Gonzales, is a mountain in the province of Cavite in the Philippines. Located in eastern Tagaytay, the inactive stratovolcano, related to the still active Taal Volcano, is the highest point in the province of Cavite, at 709 metres (2,326 feet). The slopes of the mountain are the source of the San Cristobal River that flows from the mountain to Silang, Cavite down to its mouth at Laguna de Bay in Calamba, Laguna.

The mountain's former sharp peak and readily distinguishable shape made it a reliable landmark for bearing checks when sailing in and around Manila Bay during the early days of navigation.

== Destruction ==
The mountain peak was previously much higher with an elevation of 752 meters (2,467 ft), Its former profile, "a sharp peak at the eastern end of a table of land (Tagaytay Ridge)", was one of the visible landmarks used by early navigators when sailing to and around Manila Bay. It was conical in shape with steep sides deemed "inaccessible", topped by distinct rock formations that resembled horns, (Tagalog: sungay), hence the name.

Mount Sungay was destroyed with the 1979 construction of First Lady Imelda Marcos's Palace in the Sky, a mansion originally intended as a guesthouse for former California Governor Ronald Reagan, who never arrived. This drastically changed the landscape of the Cavite highland, as the mountain was levelled to about half of its former height for the structure. The mansion remained unfinished after the People Power Revolution in 1986 that toppled the dictatorship of President Ferdinand Marcos. The new government renamed it the People's Park in the Sky, kept to show the excesses of the ousted regime.

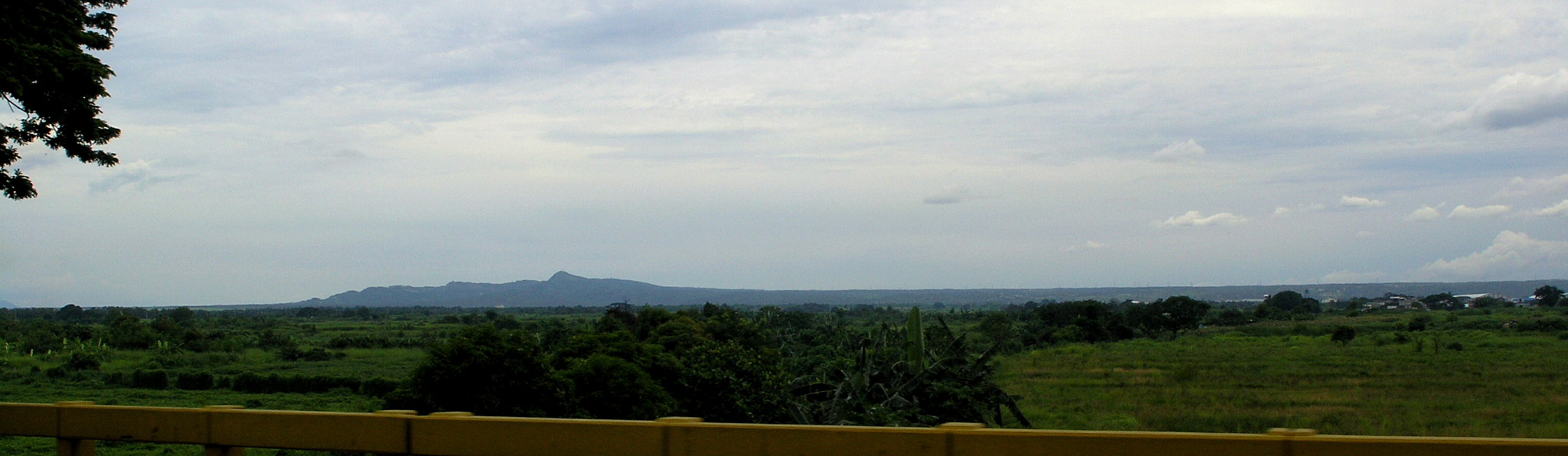
Mount Sungay as seen from the east near Calamba, Laguna. North of the peak (to the right), the elevation gently slopes down to sea level near the coast of Manila Bay.

== People's Park in the Sky ==
The People's Park in the Sky is situated at the peak of Mount Sungay, on a lot measuring 4,516 square metres (48,610 sq ft). It provides a 360°-view of Cavite and the bordering provinces of Batangas and Laguna, to as far as Manila with a straight-line distance of about 50 km (31 mi). It overlooks four bodies of water: Taal Lake, Balayan Bay, Laguna de Bay and Manila Bay. Nearby mountains visible from Mount Sungay include Mount Makiling on the Laguna-Batangas border; Mount Malepunyo and Mount Macolod in Batangas; and Mount Banahaw in Quezon.

Mount Sungay is located at Barangays Dapdap West and Dapdap East in Tagaytay, approximately 8 km (5.0 mi) east from the Tagaytay City Circle. A narrow road takes visitors near the top to the parking lot and entrance of the park. The mansion can be reached by a 300 m (980 ft) walk or by a jeepney.
