= Geronimo Cristobal =

Geronimo Cristobal may refer to:

- Geronimo Cristobal Jr., Filipino writer
- Geronimo M. Cristobal, one of the Thirteen Martyrs of Bagumbayan, murdered 1897
