= Malepunyo Mountain Range =

Volcano on the island of Luzon, Philippines

Mount Malepunyo
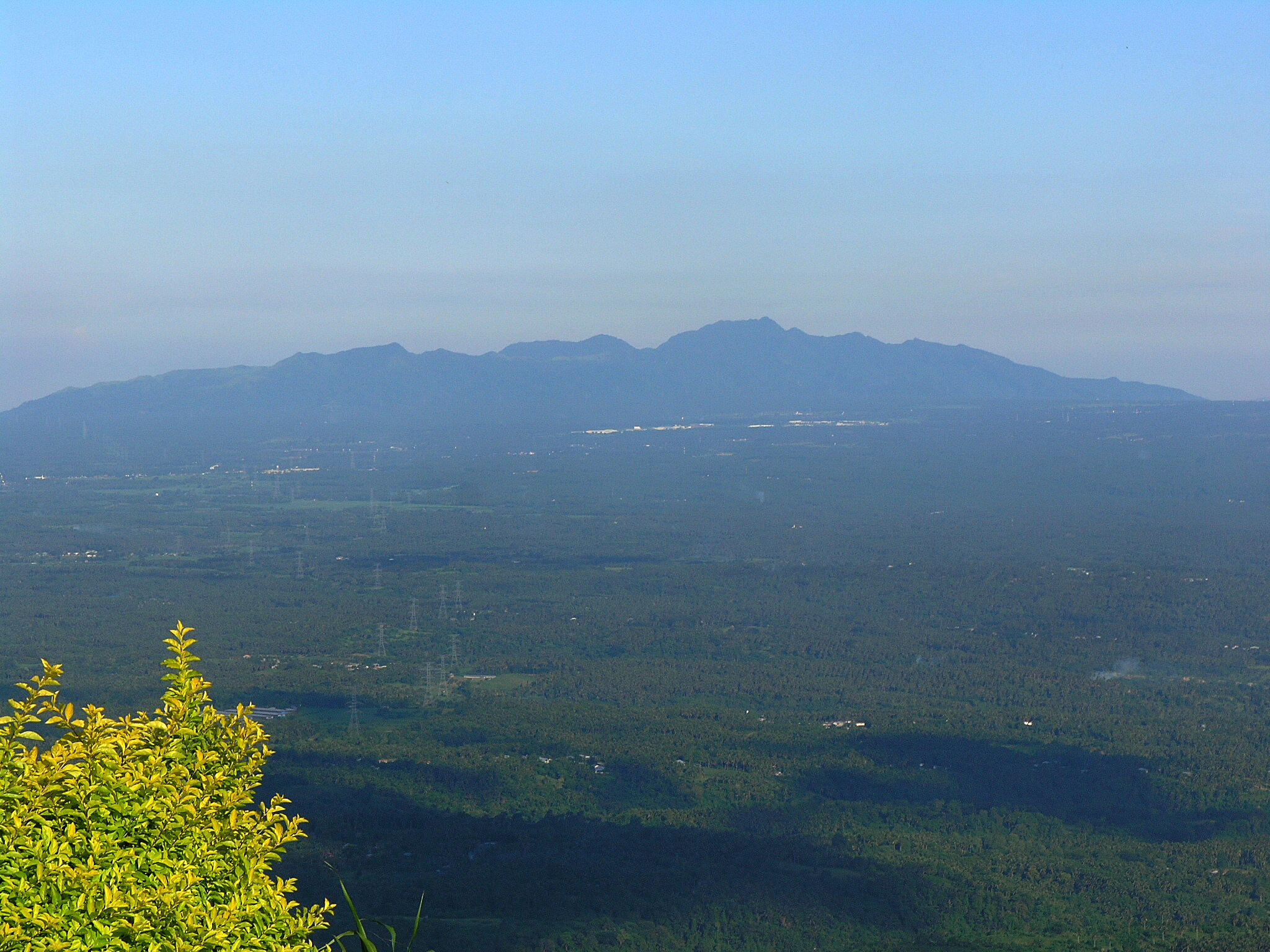
- Malepunyo Range as seen from Tagaytay

Highest point
- Elevation: 1,077 m (3,533 ft)
- Parent peak: Bagwis Peak
- Listing: Inactive volcano
- Coordinates: 13°57′48″N 121°14′23″E

Geography
- Location within Philippines
- Location: Luzon
- Country: Philippines
- Region: Calabarzon
- Province: Batangas; Laguna; Quezon
- Cities and municipalities: Santo Tomas; Lipa; Alaminos; San Pablo; Tiaong

Geology
- Rock age: Pliocene
- Mountain type: Stratovolcano
- Volcanic zone: Macolod Corridor
- Last eruption: Pleistocene

Climbing
- Easiest route: from Lipa, Batangas

Malepunyo Range (also known as Malipunyo Range, Mount Malepunyo, Mount Malipunyo, or Mount Manabu) is an inactive volcano located in Luzon. The mountain range is located between the provinces of Batangas, Laguna and Quezon. It is popular among mountaineers, and has three interconnected destinations: Mt. Malepunyo, the highest; Bagwis Peak (also known as Mt. Susong-Cambing); and Mount Dalaga (also known as Manabu Peak).

== History ==
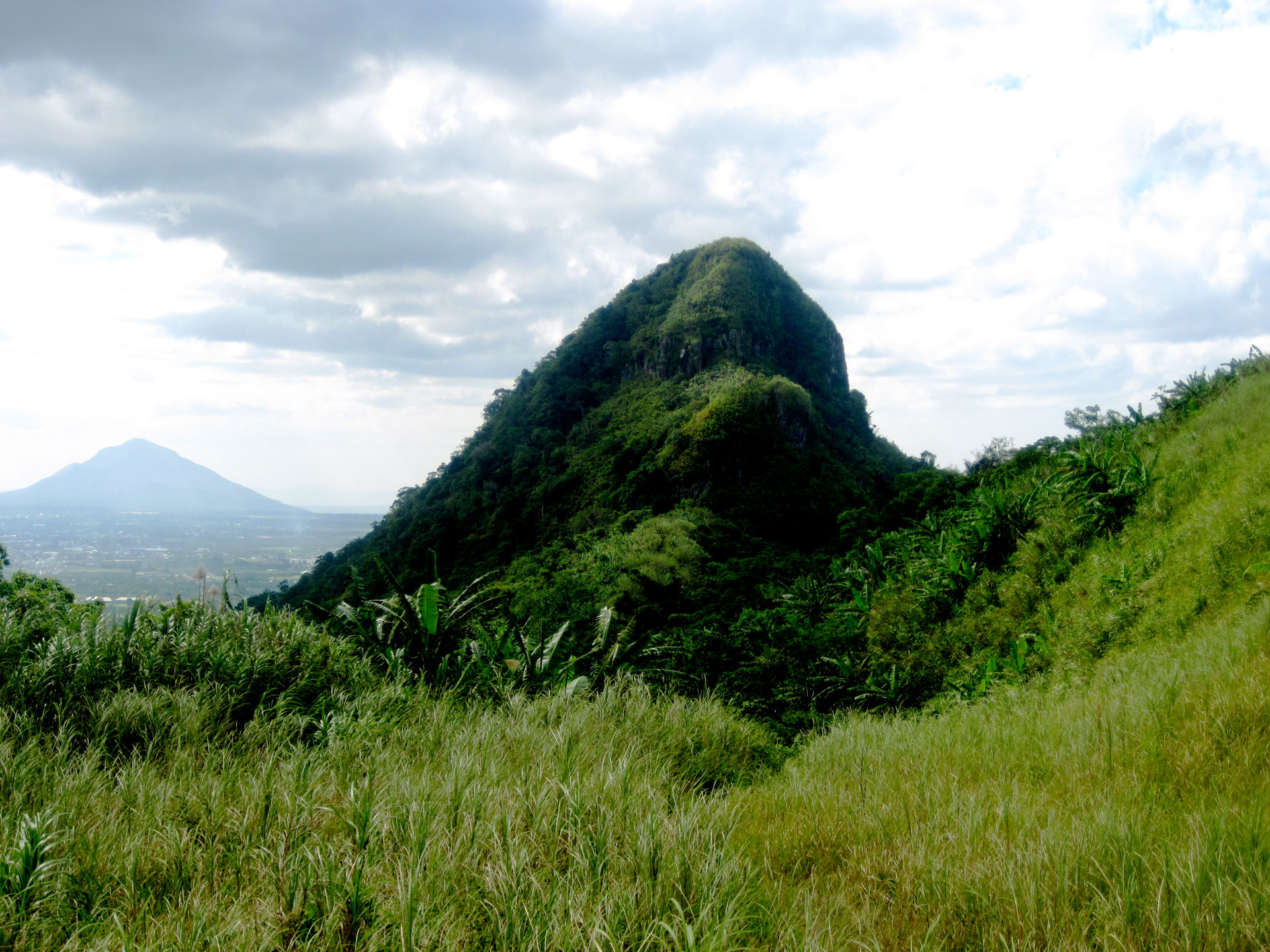
Bagwis Cliff, also known as Susong-Cambing or Susong-Dalaga

The Malepunyo Range is an inactive volcano with its caldera facing south along the vicinity between Lipa, Batangas and San Antonio, Quezon. By the 1990s the Malepunyo Mountain Range has been erroneously called "Malarayat Mountain Range" due to the famous country club located at its western slope which is named after the Malarayat Hill. Mount Malepunyo is its highest peak located at Barangay Talisay, Lipa standing at 1,002 meters (3,287 ft) above mean sea level by the ridge of its caldera. The second highest peak of the range is Mt. Dalaga standing at 755 meters (2,477 ft) above mean sea level situated at the boundary of Santo Tomas, Batangas and Alaminos, Laguna. During the 1990s, the name was changed by the locals of Santo Tomas to Manabu as a shortened Tagalog mataás na bundók (“high mountain"). At the center of the mountain range is a feature known as Bagwis Cliff by the locals, yet due to its shape it is also called Susong-Kambíng (“goat's breast”). In time, mountaineers have also mistakenly named this cliff as Susong Dalaga (“maiden's breast”), which is incidentally the oldest recorded name of Manabu Peak. A discontinued highway project connecting San Pablo, Laguna and Lipa that traverses the central part of the mountain range made way for the creation of what the mountaineers call as Biák na Bundók (“cleft mountain”).

== Physical characteristics ==
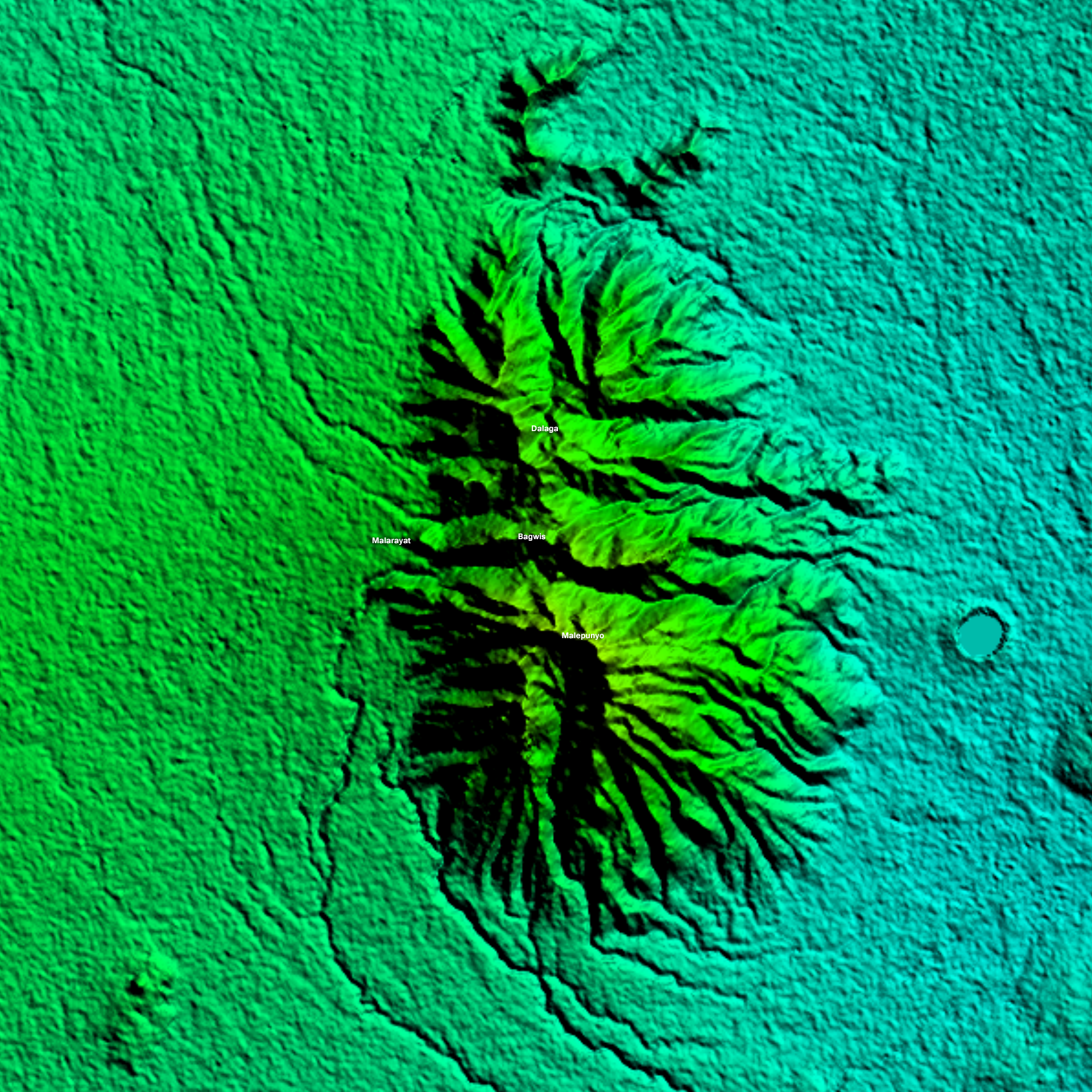
Malepunyo Range Relief Map on 1 arc second/30-meter resolution

The Malepunyo mountain range has three notable peaks:

- Mount Malepunyo (Malipunyo) 1,002 meters (3,287 ft) above mean sea level
- Mount Dalaga (Manabu Peak / Susung Dalaga) 755 meters (2,477 ft) above mean sea level
- Bagwis Peak (Susung Dalaga / Susung Cambing) 710 meters (2,330 ft) above mean sea level

== Geology ==
Mount Malepunyo is part of the Makiling-Malepunyo Volcanic Complex. Mount Makiling, located on the southwest rim of Laguna de Bay, is a 16-kilometer-diameter stratovolcano that reaches 1,115 meters (3,658 ft) above sea level. The cone is formed by a pyroclastic flow, lahar, ashfall, and lava deposits. Trachyandesites, trachydacites, and rhyolite are found in the lavas. Welded ash-flow tuffs attest to the eruption's Plinian origin. The La Mesa tuff ring, Bijiang, Mapinggon, and Masaia are all examples of smaller satellite edifices. To the south of Mt. Makiling lies a severely eroded north-south trending volcanic range, including Mapinggon, Bulalo, and Malepunyo. The higher portions of this composite volcano are dominated by lava flows and breccias, while pyroclastic flows and lahars dominate the eastern flanks. The age of the andesites from Mount Malepunyo ranges from 1.10 Ma to 0.63 Ma (De Boer and others, 1980; Oles and others, 1991).

== Product ==
The mountain range is a famous source of Alamid Coffee due to civet cats that chew on coffee beans and ferments the seeds inside their digestive systems. The fermented coffee beans are then excreted along mountain trails, gathered, cleaned, and pulverized for coffee preparation.

== Hiking ==
The jurisdiction of the Malepunyo Range is separated into two. Manabu peak is under the jurisdiction of Santo Tomas, Batangas, with its jump-off at Sitio Sulok. It resembles an easy trail to which a cross has been erected on its summit while a plateau beside it is used as a saddle camp. The southern half is under the jurisdiction of Lipa City, Batangas and the jump-off is located at Sitio Talisay. To which the trail leads to the summit of Mount Malepunyo. A class-4 trail connects Malipunyo to Manabu peak which passes through the vicinity of Bagwis Peak and the grassland plateau leading to Biak-na-Bundok and by the dense forest of the mountain range towards the plateau campsite of Manabu.

== See also ==
- List of inactive volcanoes in the Philippines
