= Mount San Cristobal =

Volcano in the Philippines

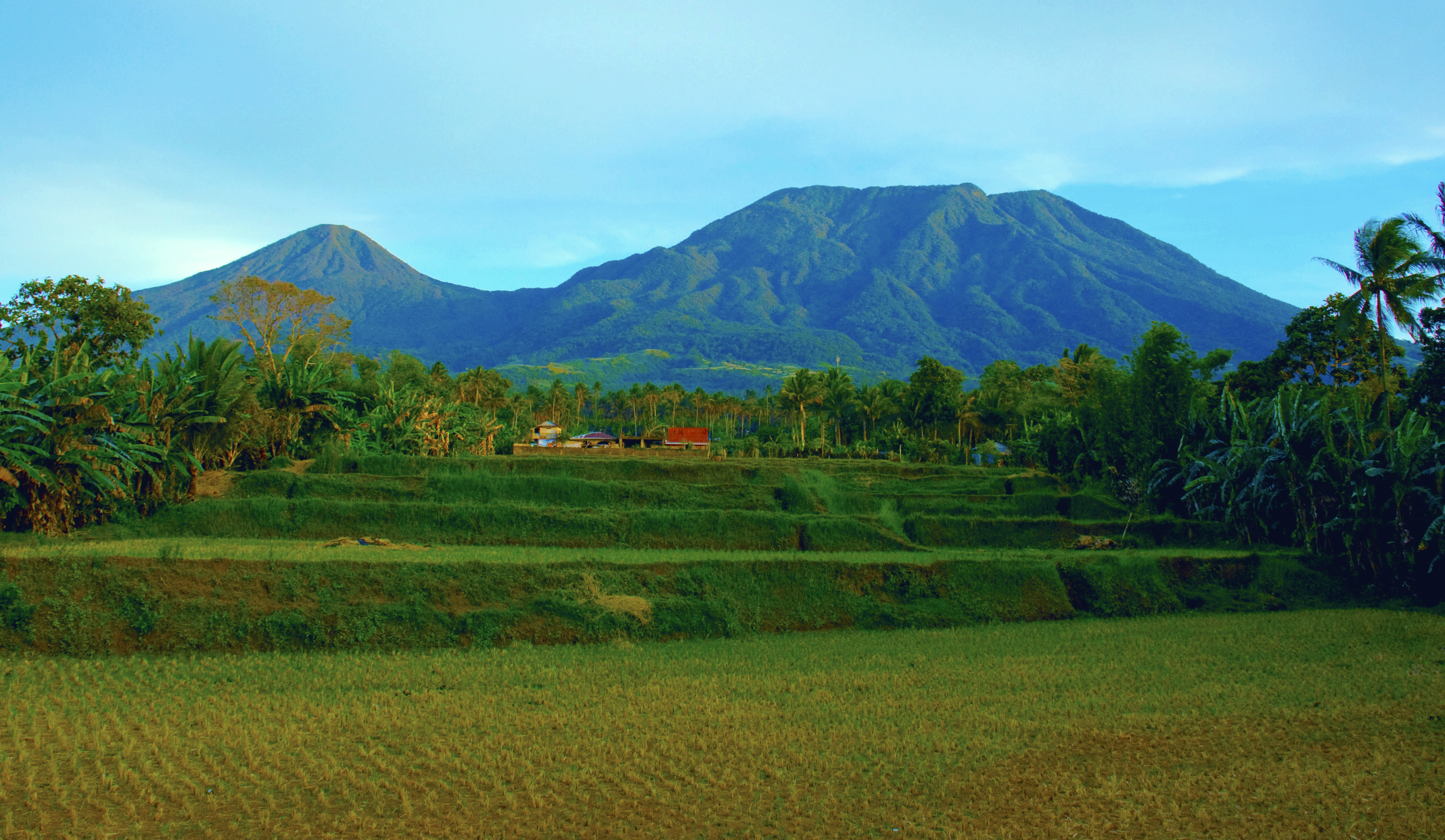
- Mount San Cristobal (right) and Mount Banahaw

Highest point
- Elevation: 1,470 m (4,820 ft)
- Listing: Potentially active
- Coordinates: 14°03′52″N 121°25′36″E

Geography
- Location within Philippines
- Location: Luzon
- Country: Philippines
- Region: Calabarzon
- Provinces: Laguna and Quezon
- Municipalities: Dolores and San Pablo

Geology
- Mountain type: Stratovolcano
- Volcanic zone: Macolod Corridor
- Last eruption: Unknown

Climbing
- Easiest route: from Dolores, Quezon

Mount San Cristobal is a potentially active stratovolcano at the boundary of the provinces of Laguna and Quezon on the island of Luzon, Philippines. The mountain rises to an elevation of 1,470 m (4,820 ft) above mean sea level and is one of the volcanic features of Macolod Corridor.

Mount San Cristobal is considered the Devil's Mountain in Filipino folklore. It is the alter-ego of the Holy Mountain, Mount Banahaw, and is part of Mounts Banahaw–San Cristobal Protected Landscape, covering 10,901 hectares (26,940 acres) of land.

The mountain is bordered by San Pablo in the province of Laguna at its northern slope and Dolores in the province of Quezon at its southern slope.

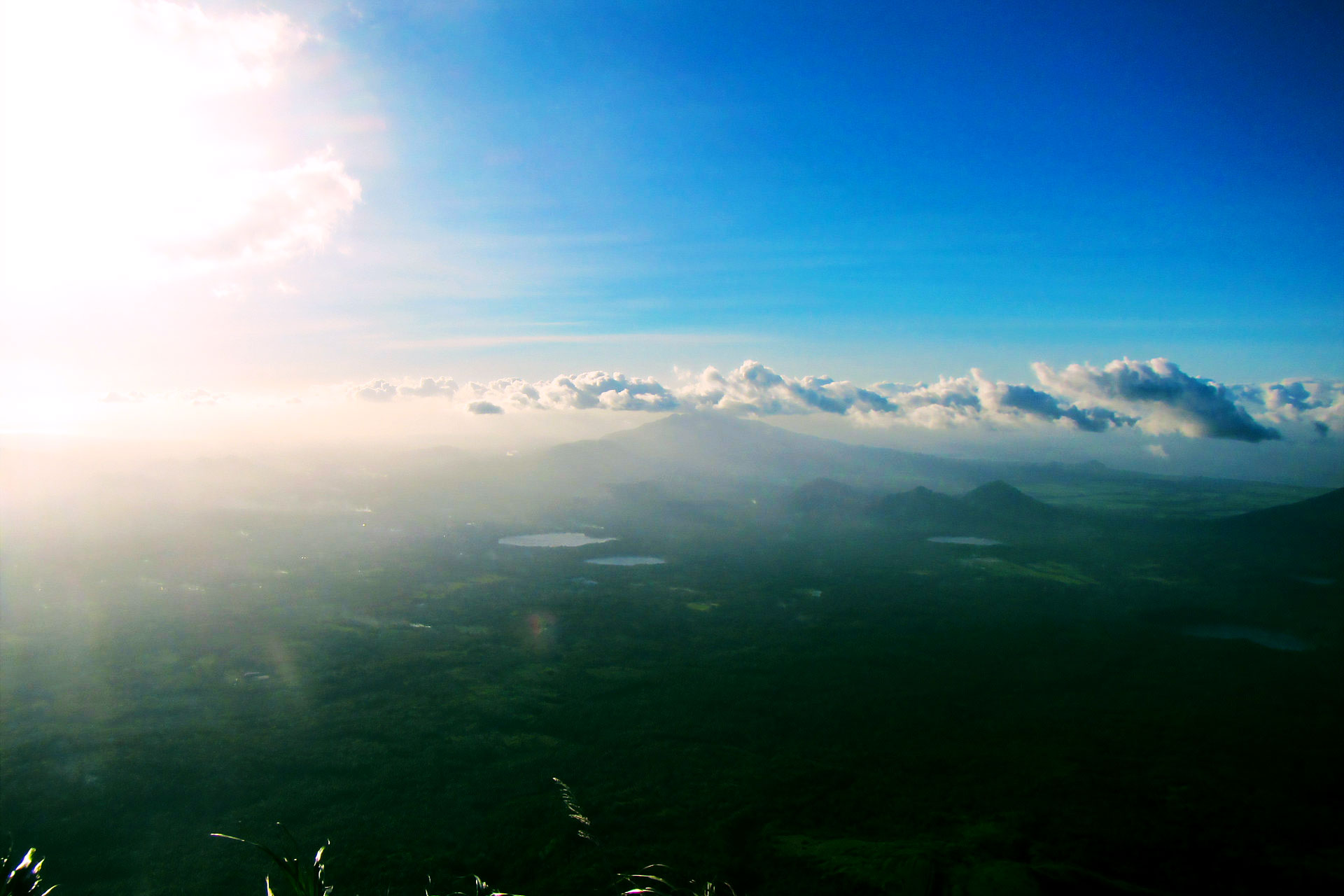
The seven lakes of San Pablo, Laguna as seen from the top of Mount San Cristobal at 1,470 meters (4,820 ft) above sea level.

== Folklore and mythology ==
Mount San Cristobal, also known in Philippine mythology and folklore as “Devil’s Mountain,” is surrounded by stories of supernatural phenomena and unexplained events. Folklore describes mountaineers hearing the voices of children near a nonexistent river, becoming disoriented despite following established trails, and encountering engkantos, or supernatural beings believed to inhabit the mountain. The mountain is also associated with the Tumao, a demon-like, Bigfoot-type creature said to dwell in its wilderness.

== See also ==
- List of mountains in the Philippines
- List of national parks of the Philippines
