= Cuenca, Batangas =

Municipality in Batangas, Philippines

Cuenca
- Municipality
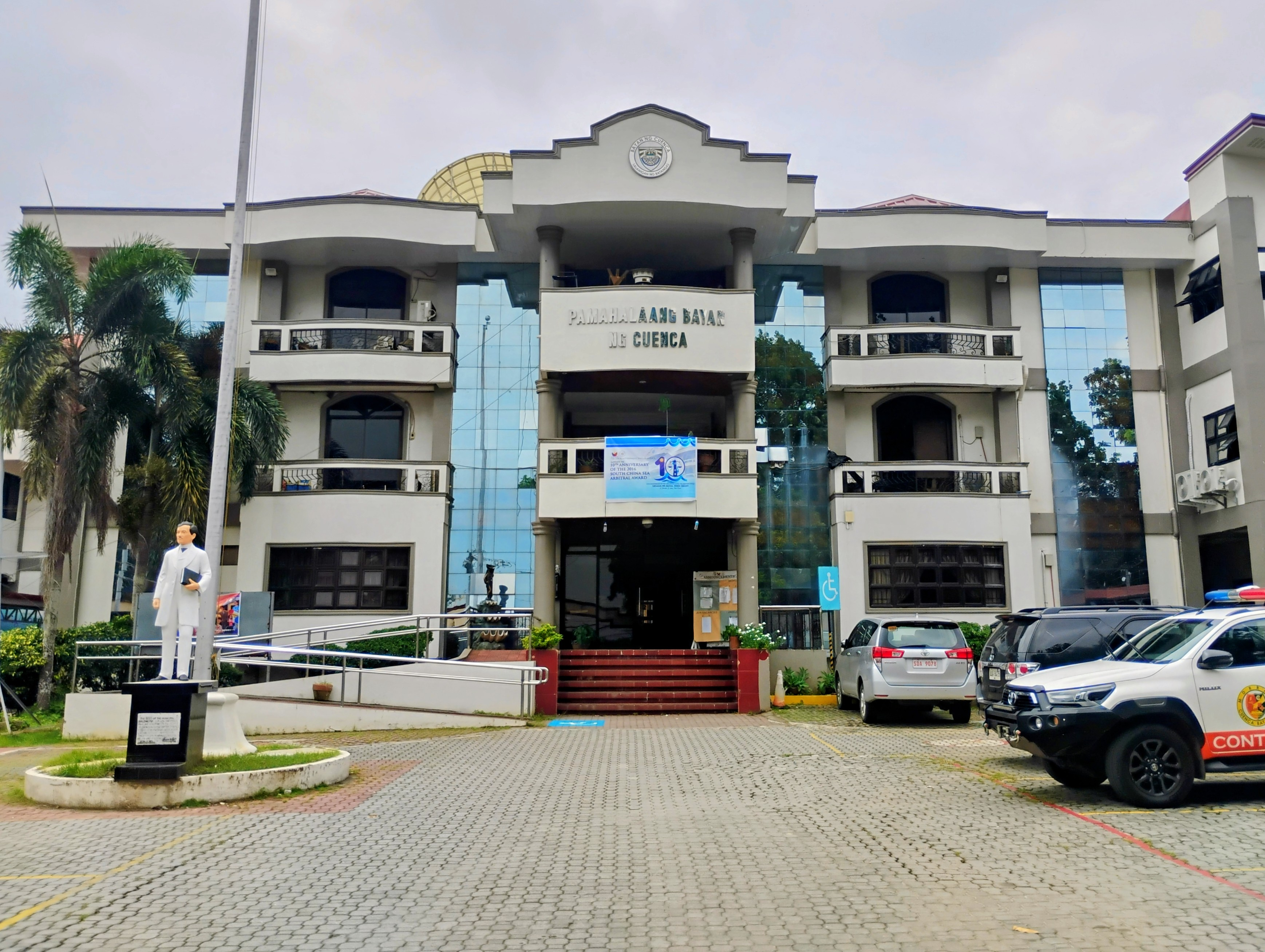
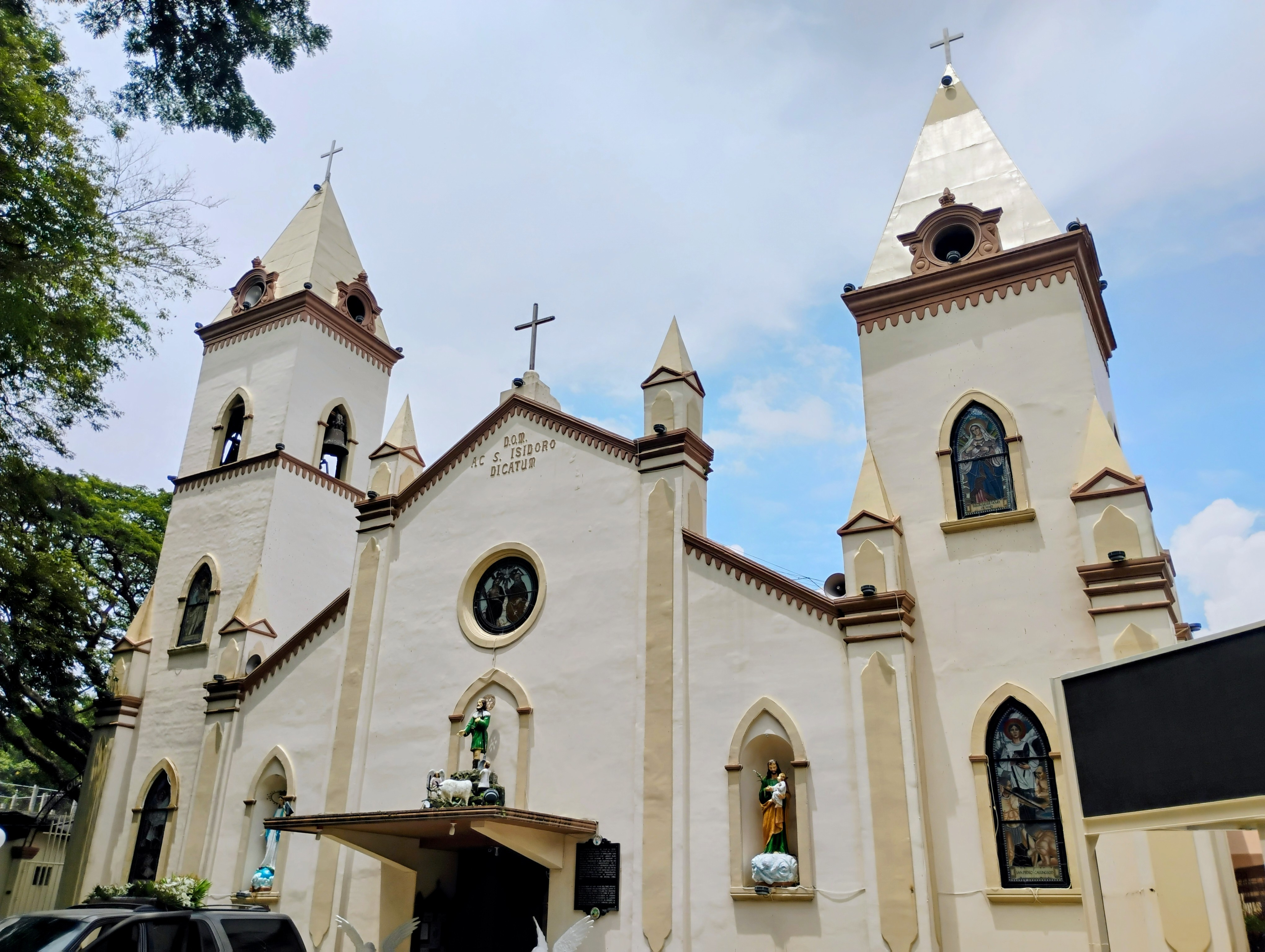
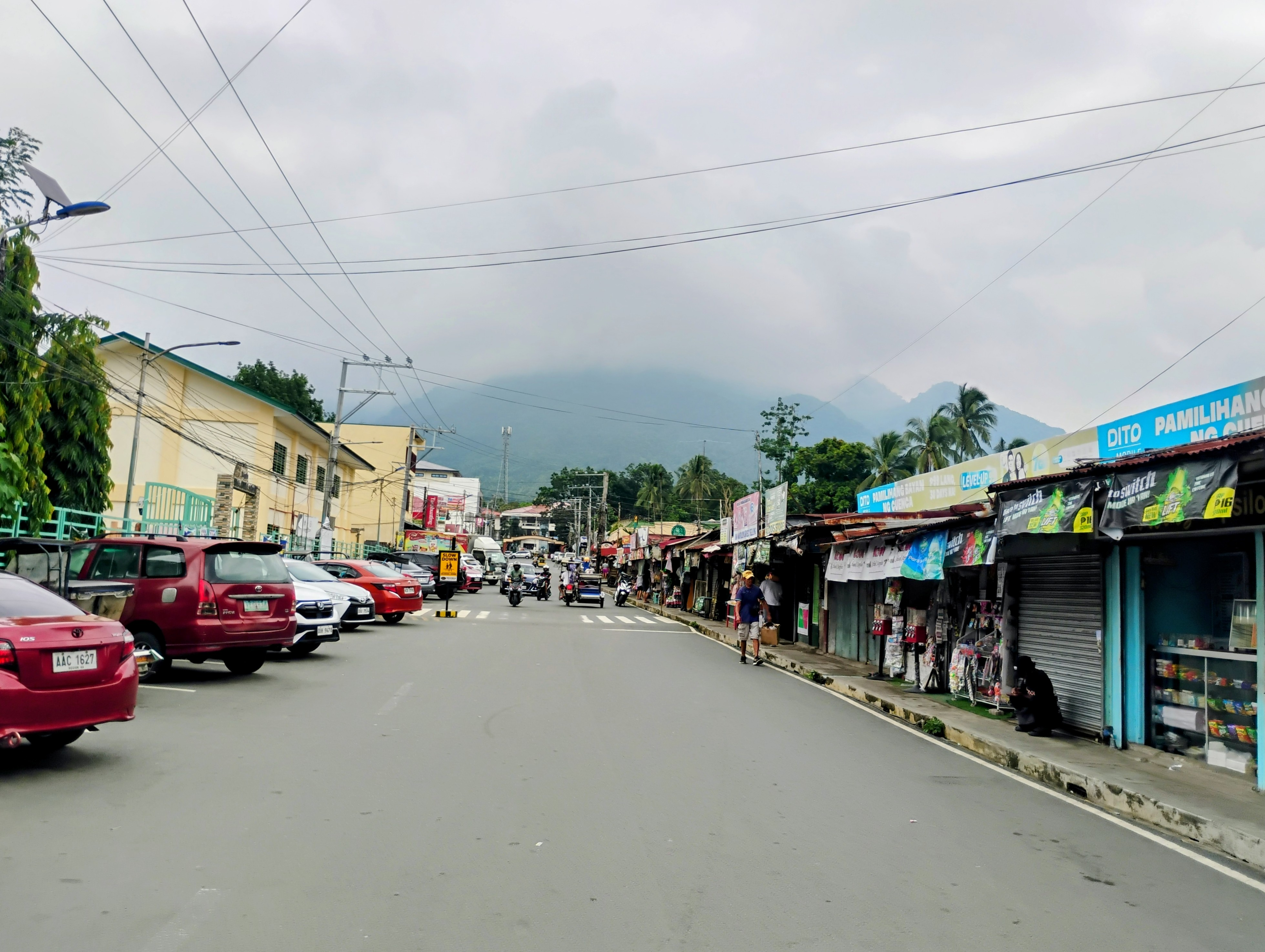
- Cuenca Municipal Hall Saint Isidore the Farmer Parish Church Cuenca Town Proper

- Seal
- Nickname: Home of Bakers
- Map of Batangas with Cuenca highlighted
- Interactive map of Cuenca
- Location within the Philippines
- Coordinates: 13°53′56″N 121°03′02″E
- Country: Philippines
- Region: Calabarzon
- Province: Batangas
- District: 3rd district
- Founded: November 7, 1876
- Named for: Cuenca, Spain or Cuenca Province
- Barangays: 21 (see Barangays)

Government
  - Type: Sangguniang Bayan
  - Mayor: Alexander M. Magpantay
  - Vice Mayor: Aurea P. Pantas
  - Representative: King George Leandro Antonio V. Collantes
  - Municipal Council: Members: Apolonio H. Chavez; Ronnel D. Pasia; Anacleto A. Javier; Crispin J. Magsombol; Ian O. Gorospe; Rolando M. La Rosa; Henry A. Larcia; Arwin M. Abe
  - Electorate: 25,742 voters (2025)

Area
  - Total: 58.18 km^{2} (22.46 sq mi)
- Elevation: 166 m (545 ft)
- Highest elevation: 957 m (3,140 ft)
- Lowest elevation: 5 m (16 ft)

Population (2024 census)
  - Total: 36,453
  - Density: 626.6/km^{2} (1,623/sq mi)
  - Households: 8,923

Economy
  - Income class: 2nd municipal income class
  - Poverty incidence: 7.71% (2023)
  - Revenue: ₱ 186.8 million (2024)
  - Assets: ₱ 474.3 million (2024)
  - Expenditure: ₱ 72.18 million (2024)
  - Liabilities: ₱ 74.95 million (2024)

Service provider
  - Electricity: Batangas 2 Electric Cooperative (BATELEC 2)
- Time zone: UTC+8 (PST)
- ZIP code: 4222
- PSGC: 0401009000
- IDD : area code: +63 (0)43
- Native languages: Tagalog

Cuenca, officially the Municipality of Cuenca (Tagalog: Bayan ng Cuenca), is a municipality in the province of Batangas, Philippines. According to the 2024 census, it has a population of 36,453 people.

== History ==
Once a part of San Jose, it became an independent town under the name "Cuenca" on either November 7, 1876 or April 7, 1877, after the Spanish hometown of the then-Governor of Batangas that resembles its cold breeze and beautiful scenic spots. Its main tourist attraction is the 700-meter-high (2,300 ft) mountain, Mount Macolod (Mount Maculot).

The patron of Cuenca is Saint Isidore the Laborer, the patron of farmers. A celebratory feast is held annually every May 15.

== Geography ==
According to the Philippine Statistics Authority, the municipality has a land area of 58.18 square kilometers (22.46 sq mi) constituting 1.86% of the 3,119.75-square-kilometer (1,204.54 sq mi) total area of Batangas.

=== Barangays ===
Cuenca is politically subdivided into 21 barangays, as indicated in the matrix below. Each barangay consists of puroks and some have sitios.

PSGC	Barangay	Population			±% p.a.	
		2024		2010		
041009001	Balagbag	2.3%	848	778	▴	0.60%
041009002	Bungahan	5.6%	2,032	1,830	▴	0.73%
041009003	Calumayin	0.9%	326	354	▾	−0.57%
041009005	Dalipit East	1.7%	609	591	▴	0.21%
041009006	Dalipit West	1.6%	593	533	▴	0.74%
041009007	Dita	12.6%	4,579	4,392	▴	0.29%
041009008	Don Juan	2.4%	885	783	▴	0.85%
041009009	Emmanuel	5.4%	1,985	2,011	▾	−0.09%
041009010	Ibabao	9.2%	3,343	3,188	▴	0.33%
041009011	Labac	5.6%	2,037	2,096	▾	−0.20%
041009012	Pinagkaisahan	5.4%	1,978	1,875	▴	0.37%
041009013	San Felipe	9.3%	3,377	3,171	▴	0.44%
041009014	San Isidro	5.7%	2,091	1,804	▴	1.03%
041009015	Barangay 1 (Poblacion)	5.2%	1,883	1,639	▴	0.97%
041009016	Barangay 2 (Poblacion)	0.7%	263	376	▾	−2.45%
041009017	Barangay 3 (Poblacion)	2.0%	735	680	▴	0.54%
041009018	Barangay 4 (Poblacion)	2.6%	930	1,022	▾	−0.65%
041009019	Barangay 5 (Poblacion)	1.0%	378	438	▾	−1.02%
041009020	Barangay 6 (Poblacion)	1.4%	513	499	▴	0.19%
041009021	Barangay 7 (Poblacion)	5.1%	1,861	1,848	▴	0.05%
041009022	Barangay 8 (Poblacion)	4.2%	1,537	1,328	▴	1.02%
	Total		36,453	31,236	▴	1.08%

In 1954, Don Juan was constituted as a barrio from the sitios of Lungos ng Parang, Kulit, Lumampao, Pisa, Napapanayan and Lagundian.

=== Climate ===
Climate data for Cuenca, Batangas
Month	Jan	Feb	Mar	Apr	May	Jun	Jul	Aug	Sep	Oct	Nov	Dec	Year
Mean daily maximum °C (°F)	27 (81)	28 (82)	30 (86)	31 (88)	30 (86)	28 (82)	27 (81)	27 (81)	27 (81)	27 (81)	27 (81)	27 (81)	28 (83)
Mean daily minimum °C (°F)	18 (64)	18 (64)	19 (66)	20 (68)	22 (72)	23 (73)	22 (72)	22 (72)	22 (72)	21 (70)	20 (68)	19 (66)	21 (69)
Average precipitation mm (inches)	11 (0.4)	13 (0.5)	14 (0.6)	32 (1.3)	101 (4.0)	142 (5.6)	208 (8.2)	187 (7.4)	175 (6.9)	131 (5.2)	68 (2.7)	39 (1.5)	1,121 (44.3)
Average rainy days	5.2	5.0	7.4	11.5	19.8	23.5	27.0	25.9	25.2	23.2	15.5	8.3	197.5
Source: Meteoblue (modeled/calculated data, not measured locally)

== Demographics ==
Population census of Cuenca
Year	Pop.	±% p.a.
1903	5,990	—
1918	7,106	+1.15%
1939	7,838	+0.47%
1948	9,063	+1.63%
1960	11,056	+1.67%
1970	14,538	+2.77%
1975	15,975	+1.91%
1980	17,109	+1.38%
1990	20,176	+1.66%
1995	22,758	+2.28%
2000	25,642	+2.59%
2007	28,581	+1.51%
2010	31,236	+3.29%
2015	32,783	+0.92%
2020	36,235	+2.13%
2024	36,453	+0.14%
Source: Philippine Statistics Authority

In the 2024 census, Cuenca had a population of 36,453 people. The population density was 630 inhabitants per square kilometre (1,600/sq mi).

== Economy ==
Poverty incidence of Cuenca (%)

Source: Philippine Statistics Authority

== Education ==
The Cuenca Schools District Office governs all educational institutions within the municipality. It oversees the management and operations of all private and public, from primary to secondary schools.

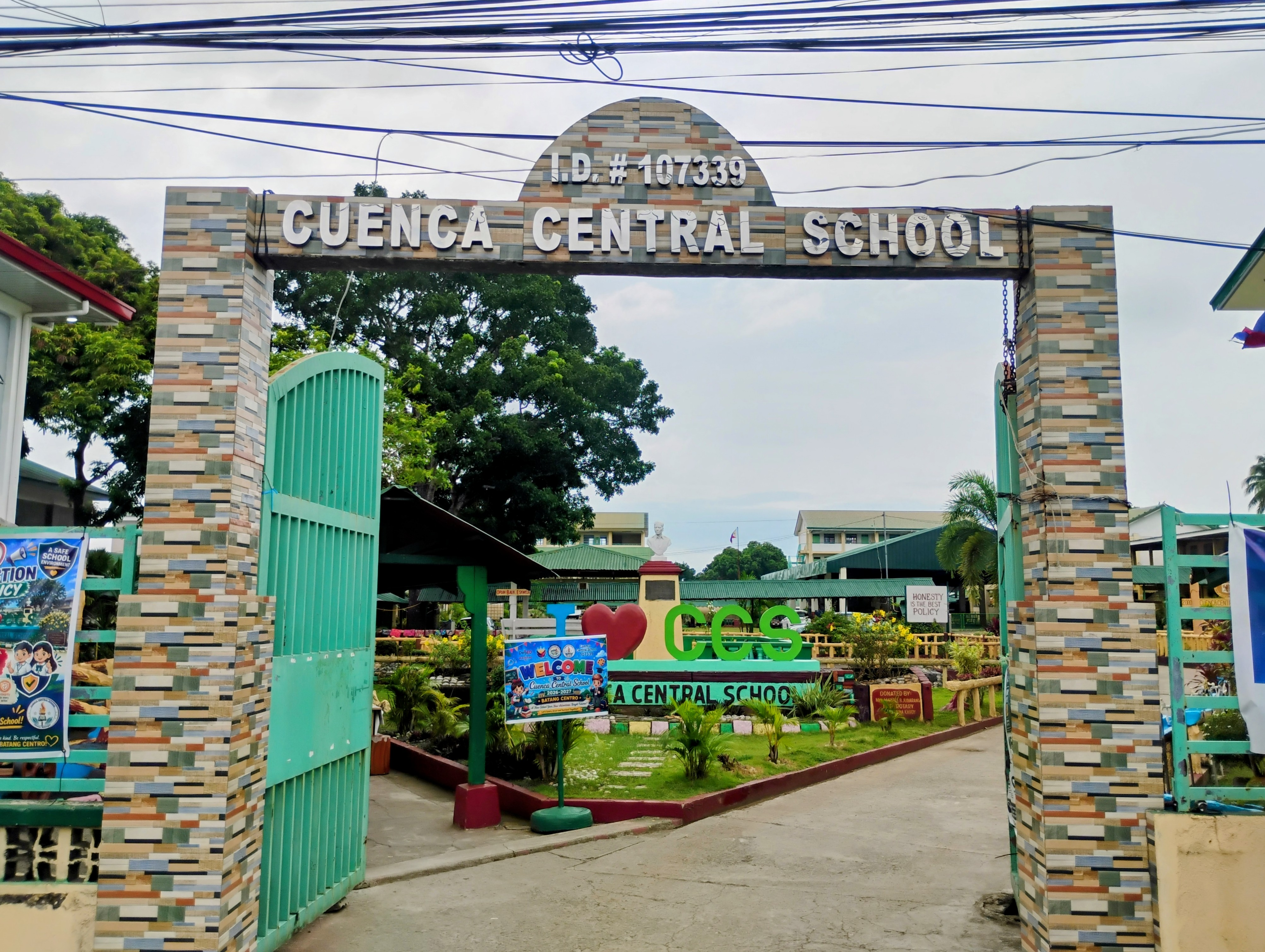
Cuenca Central School

=== Primary and elementary schools ===
- Balagbag Elementary School
- Briccio Pantas Memorial Elementary School
- Calumayin Elementary School
- Child's Access and Steps to Learning and Enhancement
- Col. Pedro Pasia Memorial School
- Cuenca Central School
- Dalipit East Bo. School
- Dalipit Elementary School
- Don Juan Elementary School
- Dr. Ananias Chavez Memorial School
- Emmanuel Elementary School
- Fieldridge Learning Center
- Ibabao Elementary School
- Kalayaan Christian School
- Labac Elementary School
- Lumampao Elementary School
- San Felipe Elementary School
- St. Isidore Catholic School
- Tomasa C. Pasia Memorial School
- Ramon Paterno Memorial Elementary School
- Yeshua Academy of the Philippines

=== Secondary schools ===
- Cuenca Institute
- Cuenca National High School
- Cuenca Senior High School
- Fermin La Rosa National High School

== Gallery ==
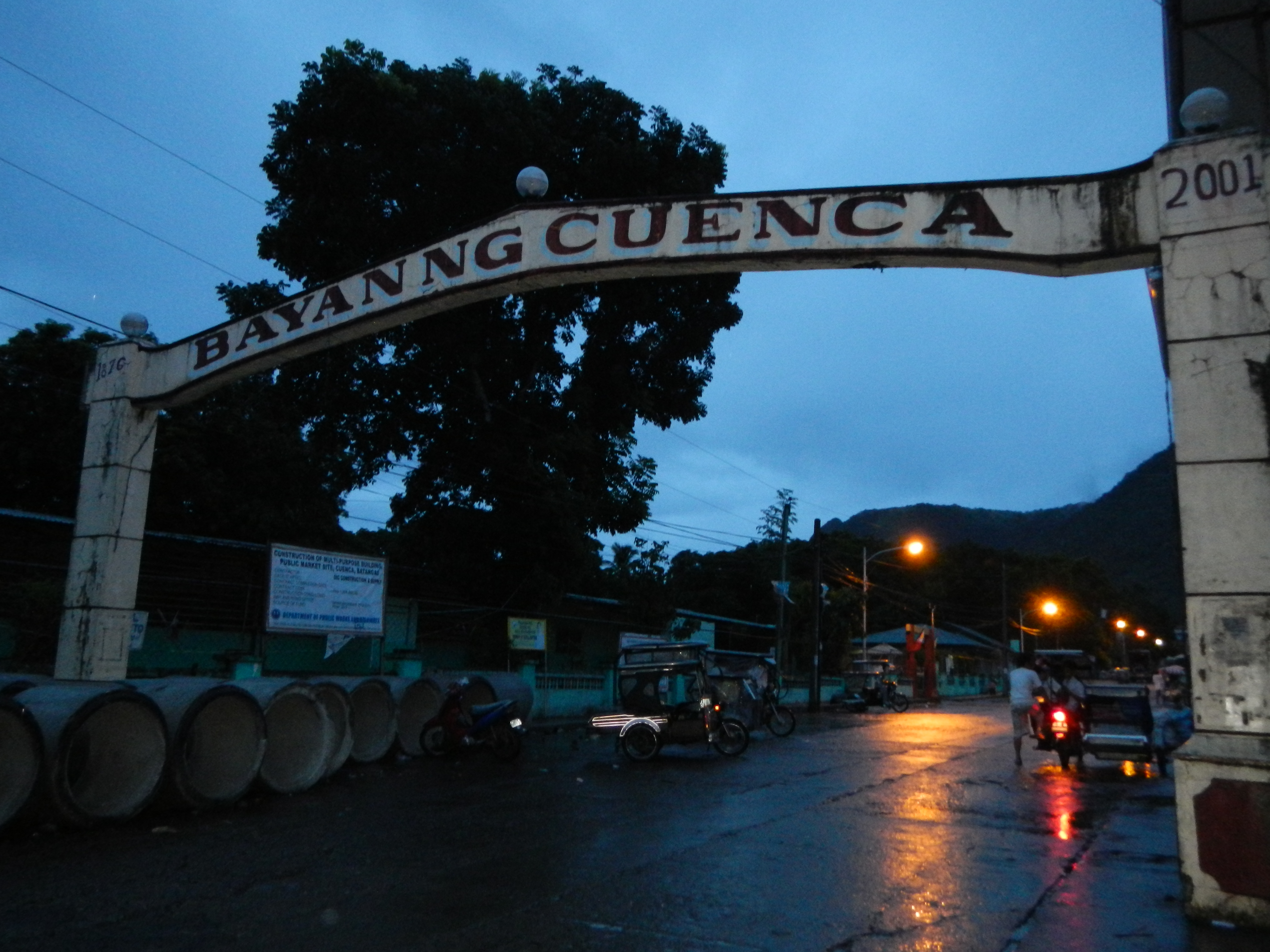
Welcome arch

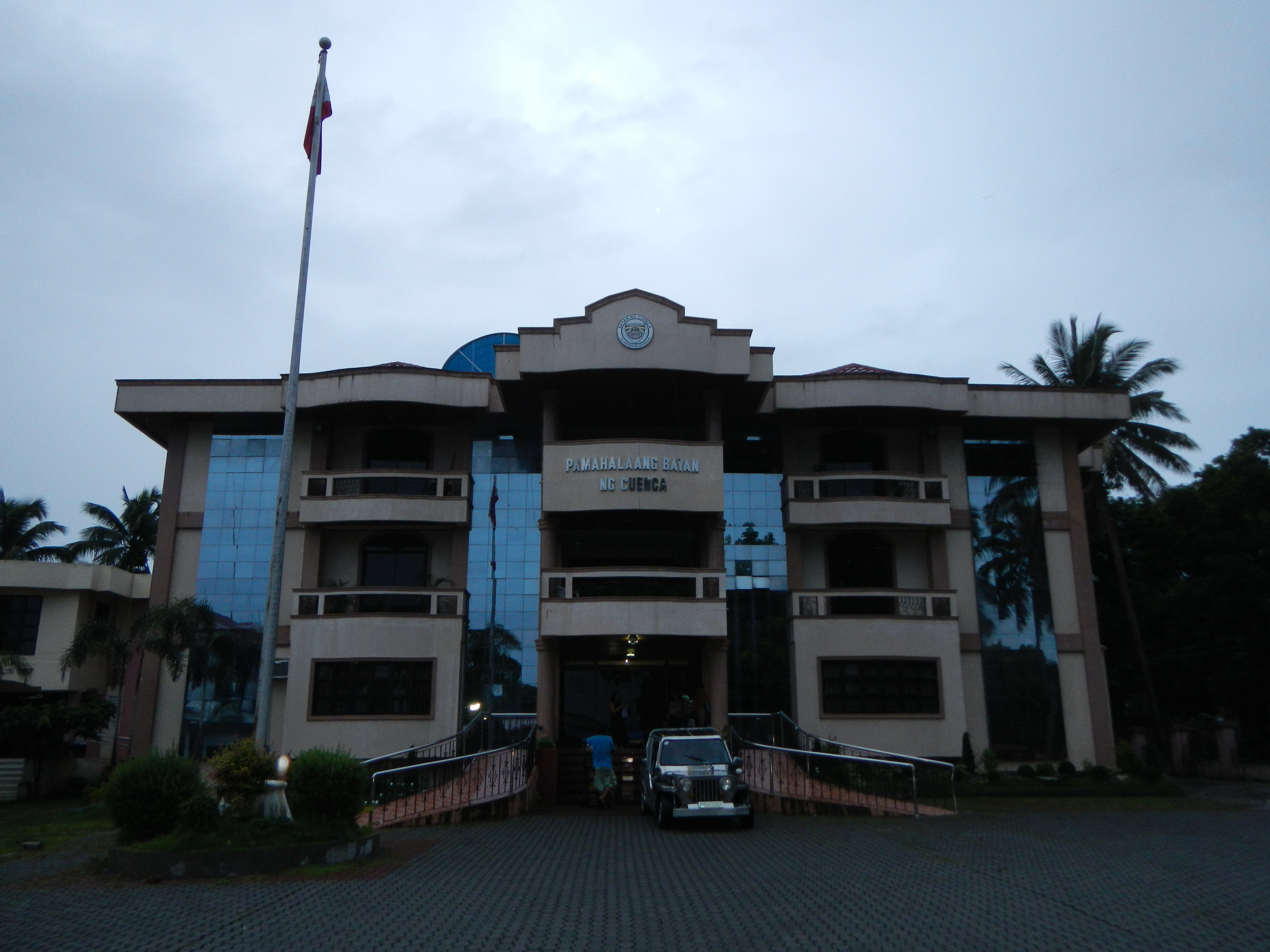
Municipal hall

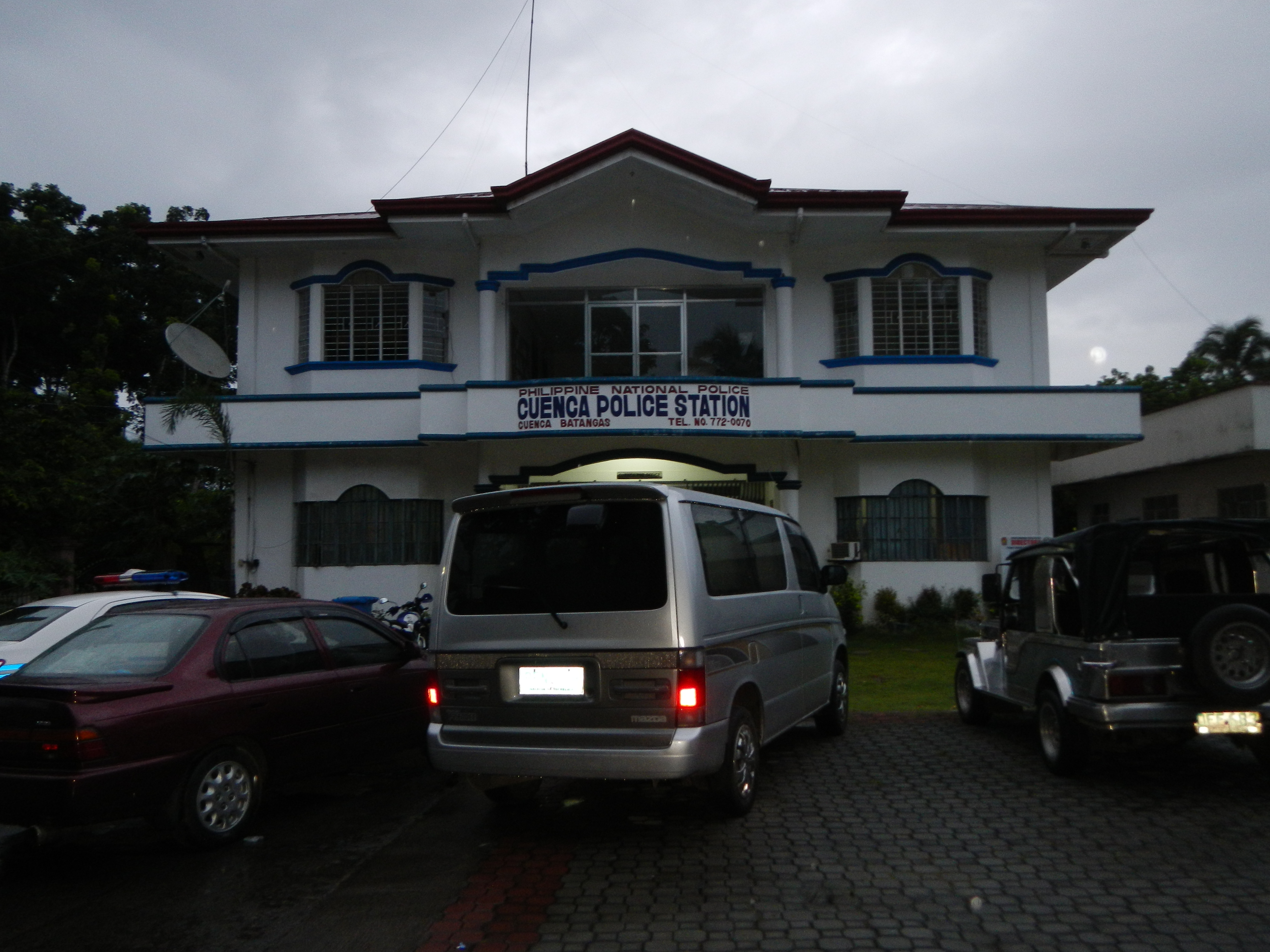
Police station

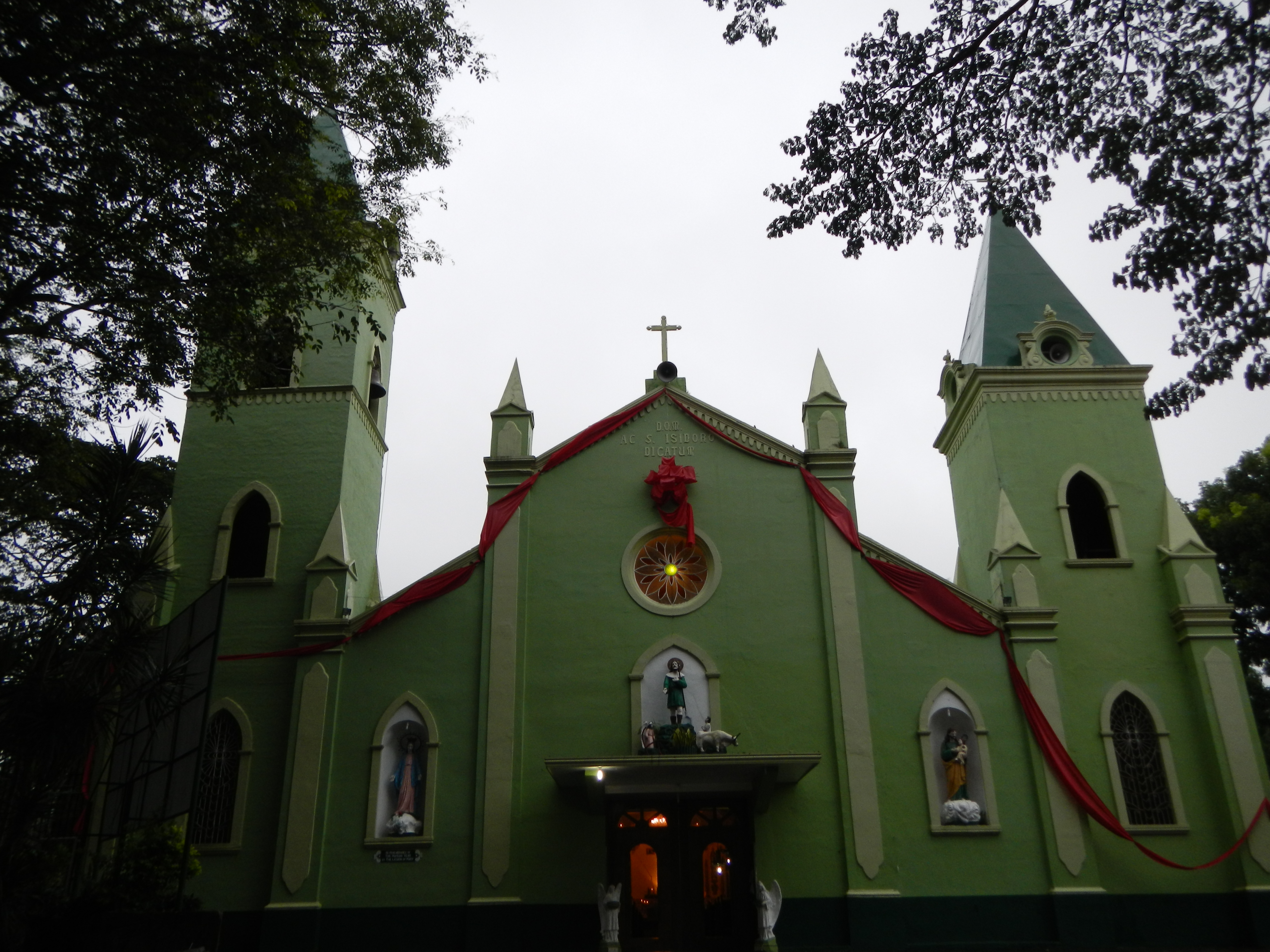
Saint Isidore the Farmer Parish Church

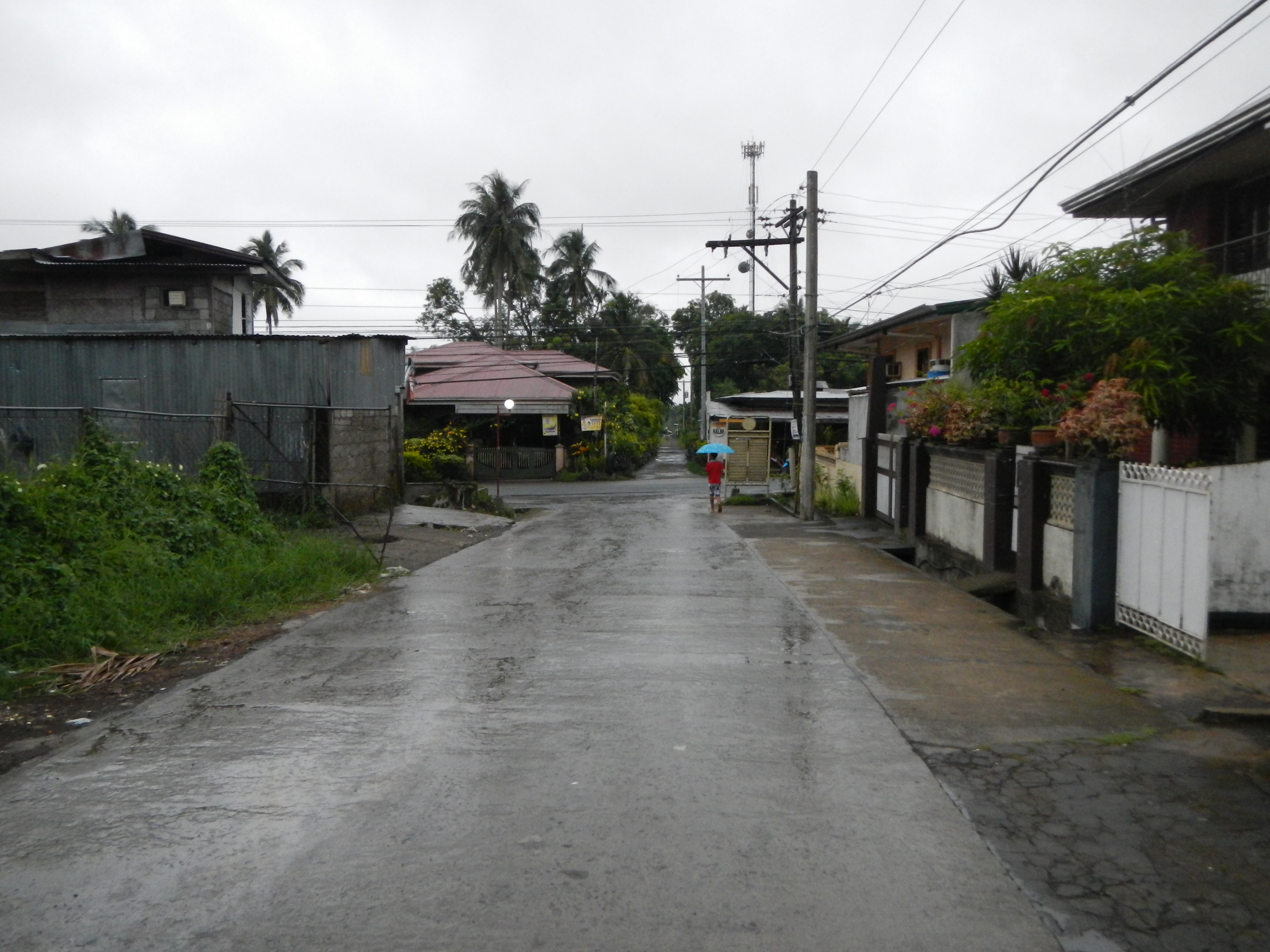
Street in Cuenca
