= Cristóbal López =

Cristobal López may refer to:

- Cristóvão Lopes, Portuguese painter, known as "Cristóbal López" in Spain
- Cristóbal López (18th century), Spanish painter
- Cristóbal López (soccer player) (born 1988), Chilean footballer
- Cristóbal López (businessman), Argentine businessman
