= People's Park in the Sky =

Park in Tagaytay, Philippines

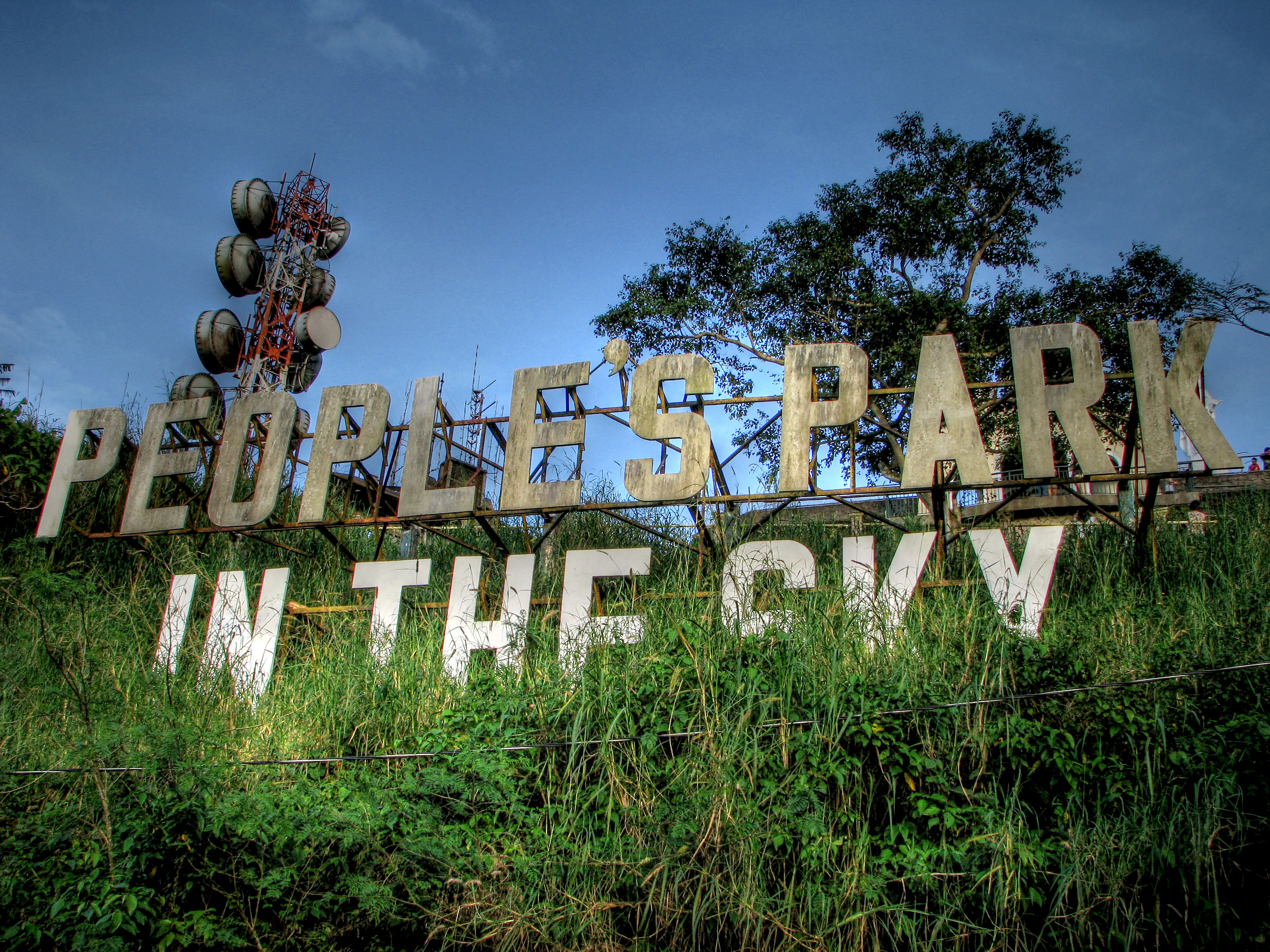
- Interactive map of People's Park in the Sky
- Type: Urban park
- Location: Mount Sungay in Calabuso North, Tagaytay, Cavite, Philippines
- Coordinates: 14°8′29″N 121°1′19″E
- Status: Open to public

The People's Park in the Sky, often simply called People's Park and originally named Palace in the Sky, is a historic urban park in Tagaytay, Cavite, Philippines.

The park was converted from an unfinished mansion, known as the Palace in the Sky, built during the Marcos regime to host the state visit of then-United States President Ronald Reagan, but discontinued when the latter canceled his visit. The complex’s conversion came in 1986 after Marcos was deposed and replaced by Corazon Aquino. The incomplete scaffolding of the mansion remained intact.

The Shrine of Our Lady, Mother of Fair Love and a Doppler weather radar station maintained by the Philippine Atmospheric, Geophysical and Astronomical Services Administration (PAGASA) are also within the park.

== History ==
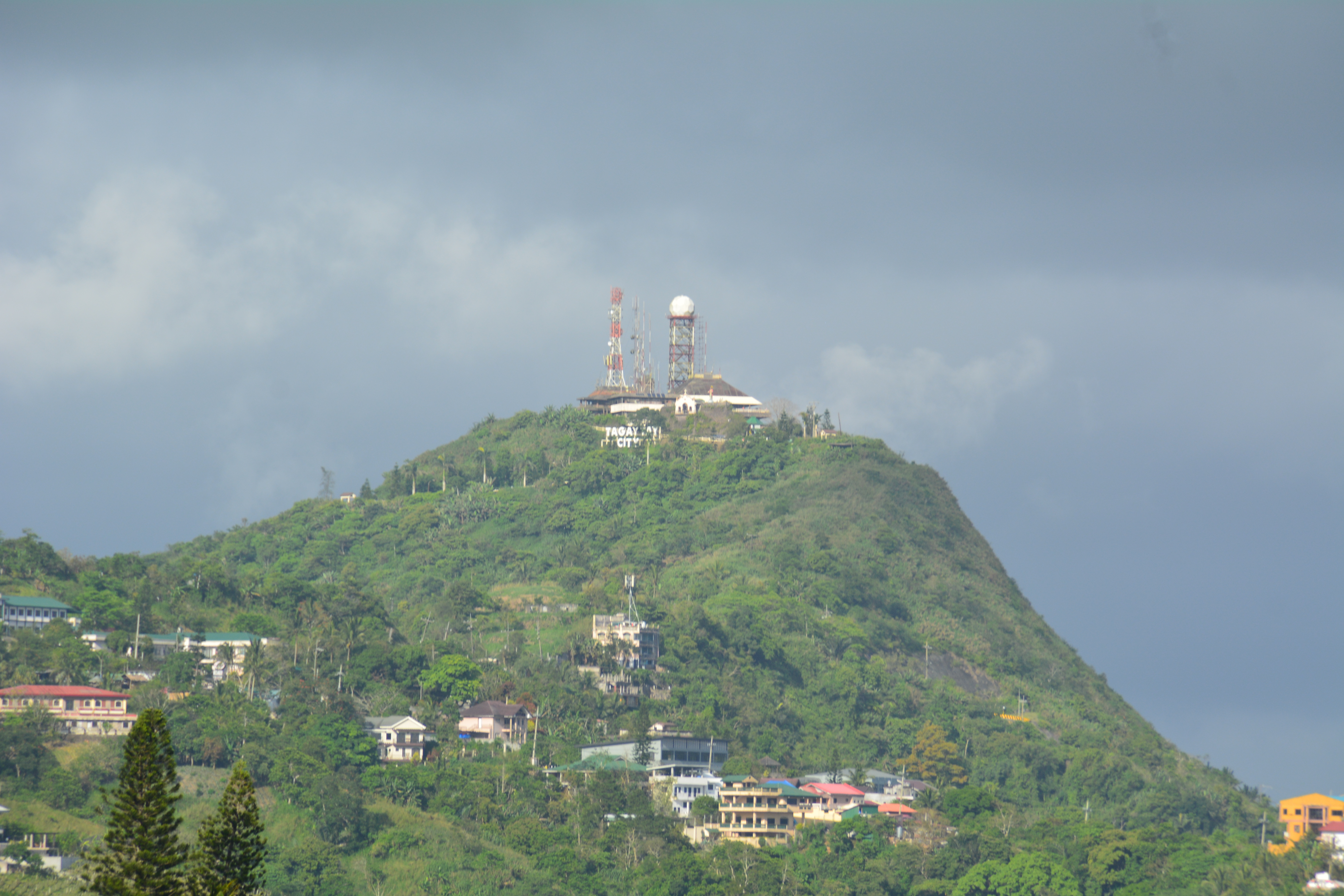
People's Park in the Sky on Mount Sungay, as seen from Picnic Grove

During the dictatorship of President Ferdinand Marcos, Sr, First Lady Imelda Marcos decided to build a mansion on government land atop Mount Sungay (also known as Mount Gonzales), the highest point in the province of Cavite. The summit had been previously used by the Bureau of Air Transport as a radar station.

Construction on the mansion began in 1981. The height of the summit, originally 752 m (2,467 ft), made the work difficult, and roads were specially built to enable supplies to reach the site, which was levelled to a height to 709 m (2,326 ft). Farmers living on the mountain’s slopes were also forced to relocate.

Construction of the mansion was hastened when U.S. President Ronald Reagan announced his intention to visit the Philippines in November 1983. It was reported that the Marcos administration planned to accommodate Reagan at the mansion, but construction halted after the trip was cancelled. The building's skeleton was only completed.

Following Marcos’ ouster in the People Power Revolution in February 1986, critics described the unfinished mansion as a symbol of his regime’s excesses. In May 1989, a helicopter used for filming Delta Force 2: The Colombian Connection crashed near the palace. No architectural drawings of the building, or documents containing information of its architect were found or recorded, according to the Tourism Infrastructure and Enterprise Zone Authority and the local government of Tagaytay.

== Marian chapel ==
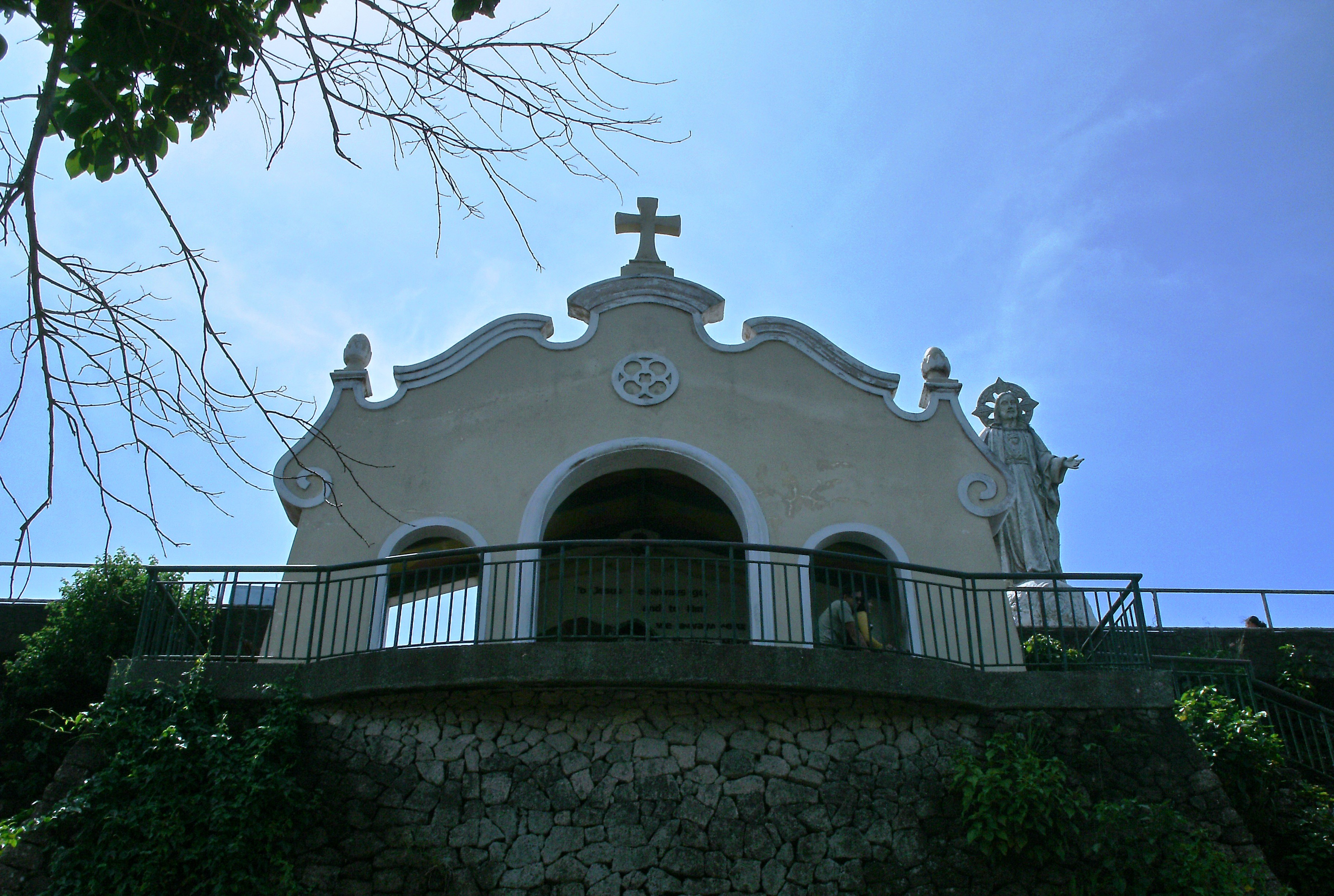
The chapel at the park

The Shrine of Our Lady, Mother of Fair Love is located within the park. The shrine was blessed on December 15, 1974, with the installation of the image of the Blessed Virgin Mary and the Child Jesus by Hernan D. Reyes, aided by four high school students and two workers. During construction of the complex in 1981, workers were unable to blast a huge rock that containing the image of the Blessed Virgin Mary with several dynamite blasts. The rock was thus left intact after the discovery of the image.
