= Cristóbal Rojas =

Cristóbal Rojas may refer to:

- Cristóbal Rojas (artist), (1857–1890), one of the most important and high-profile Venezuelan painters of the 19th century
- Cristóbal Rojas Municipality, a municipality in the Venezuelan state of Miranda, named after the artist
- Cristóbal de Rojas (1555–1614), Spanish military engineer and architect
