= Tagaytay Ridge =

Mountain range in Cavite, Philippines

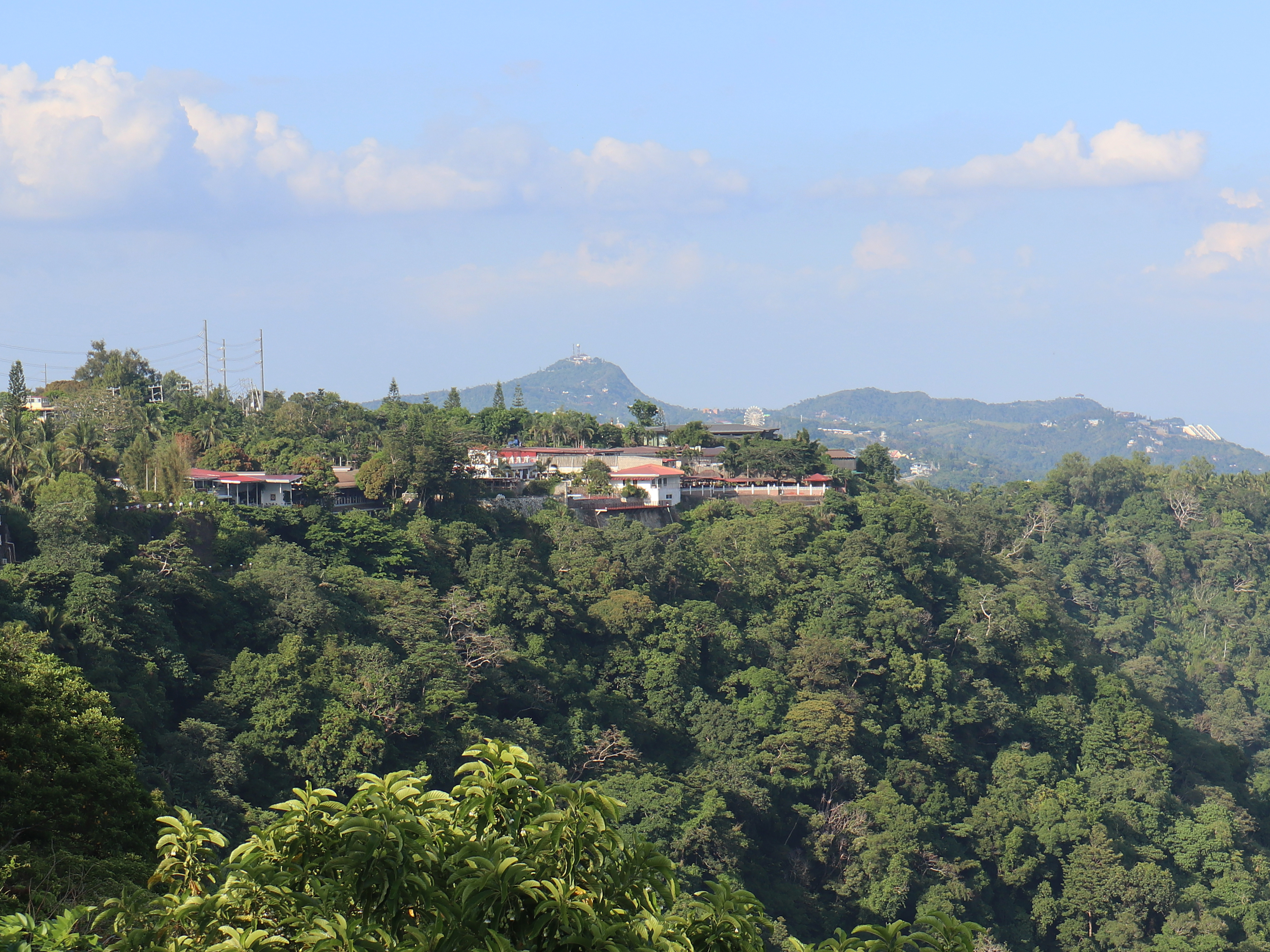
View of Tagaytay Ridge in Tagaytay, looking to the east towards Mount Sungay

The Tagaytay Ridge, also known as the Tagaytay Range, is a 32-kilometer (20 mi) mountain range located at the southern part of the province of Cavite, Philippines, with elevations averaging about 600 m (2,000 ft) above sea level. Stretching west-southwest from Mount Sungay to Mount Batulao in Batangas, the ridge overlooks the picturesque Taal Lake and serves as the northern rim of the expansive Taal Caldera.

The 25 km × 30 km (16 mi × 19 mi) wide caldera of the collapsed ground is partially filled by Taal Lake, where the current vent structure of the volcano is situated near the lake's center. The northern slope of the ridge gradually descends to sea level at Manila Bay, offering a gentle roll compared to the rapid drop on its southern slopes and east of Mount Sungay. Particularly, along the lakeside, substantial escarpments of 20 m (66 ft) or more, with almost vertical profiles, can be observed at specific locations such as Mahabangato in Barangay Banga and Balitbiring in Barangay Caloocan, both in Talisay, Batangas.

The Tagaytay Ridge is part of the upland mountainous area of Cavite, encompassing the communities of Tagaytay (which was named after the ridge), Alfonso, Mendez, and parts of Amadeo, Indang, Magallanes, Maragondon, and Silang, which are situated at elevations above 400 meters (1,300 ft) with slopes of more than 2%.

The Tagaytay Ridge also contains the Matang Tubig (Eye of the Water) spring, used for irrigation and to power a small hydroelectric plant. The 19th-century artesian spring produces approximately 3000 gallons of water per minute.
