= Jigger Cruz =

Filipino painter

- Born: Jigger P. Cruz; 12 September 1984 (age 41); Malabon City, Metro Manila, Philippines
- Education: Far Eastern University, De La Salle College of Saint Benilde
- Occupation: Painter
- Years active: 2007–present

Jigger Cruz (born September 12, 1984) is a Filipino painter.

== Early life and education ==
Cruz was born on September 12, 1984, in Malabon City in Metro Manila. He graduated with a Bachelor of Fine Arts at the Far Eastern University. He took courses at the De La Salle College of Saint Benilde before pursuing a full-time career as a painter.

== Career ==
Cruz works in both figure and abstraction in his paintings. He rose to prominence through a series of works that copied paintings by European and Filipino masters covered with gaudy colors of oil paint directly squeezed from the tube or through a cake piping. Before regular showings in art galleries and museums, Cruz almost gave up painting until he took up an apprenticeship under Filipino painter Manuel Ocampo in 2011. Since then, he has been known to be among the Philippine's under-thirty art superstars who rose to prominence since 2009 through unprecedented sales and auction records and exposure in international expositions.
