= Cristóbal López (footballer) =

Chilean footballer (born 1988)

Personal information
- Full name: Cristóbal Giovanni López Jara
- Date of birth: 13 May 1988 (age 38)
- Place of birth: Santiago, Chile
- Height: 1.65 m (5 ft 5 in)
- Position: Right-back

Youth career
- 1999–2006: Universidad de Chile

Senior career*
Years	Team	Apps	(Gls)
2007–2010	Universidad de Chile	13	(0)
2008	→ Santiago Wanderers (loan)	18	(1)
2011	Deportes Ovalle	–	(–)
2012	Deportes Linares	–	(–)
2013	Unión San Felipe	6	(0)

International career
2004	Chile U16		
2005	Chile U17		
- * Club domestic league appearances and goals

Cristóbal Giovanni López Jara (born 13 May 1988) is a Chilean former footballer who played as a right-back. His nickname is "Lapiz" (Pencil).

== Career ==
He began his career in the youth system of Universidad de Chile before making his debut in the 2007 Apertura tournament against Universidad de Concepción. In 2008, he was loaned to Santiago Wanderers. He then returned in 2009 to Universidad de Chile to play Apertura 2009 Chilean Tournament and under a highly controversial game on 10 May, he played along with the "B team" against its traditional rival Universidad Católica de Chile, Universidad de Chile won 1–0.

== Honours ==
Universidad de Chile

- Primera División de Chile (1): 2009 Apertura
