= Fort San Cristóbal (Spain) =

Cultural property in Pamplona, Spain

Coordinates: 42°51′26″N 1°39′50″W

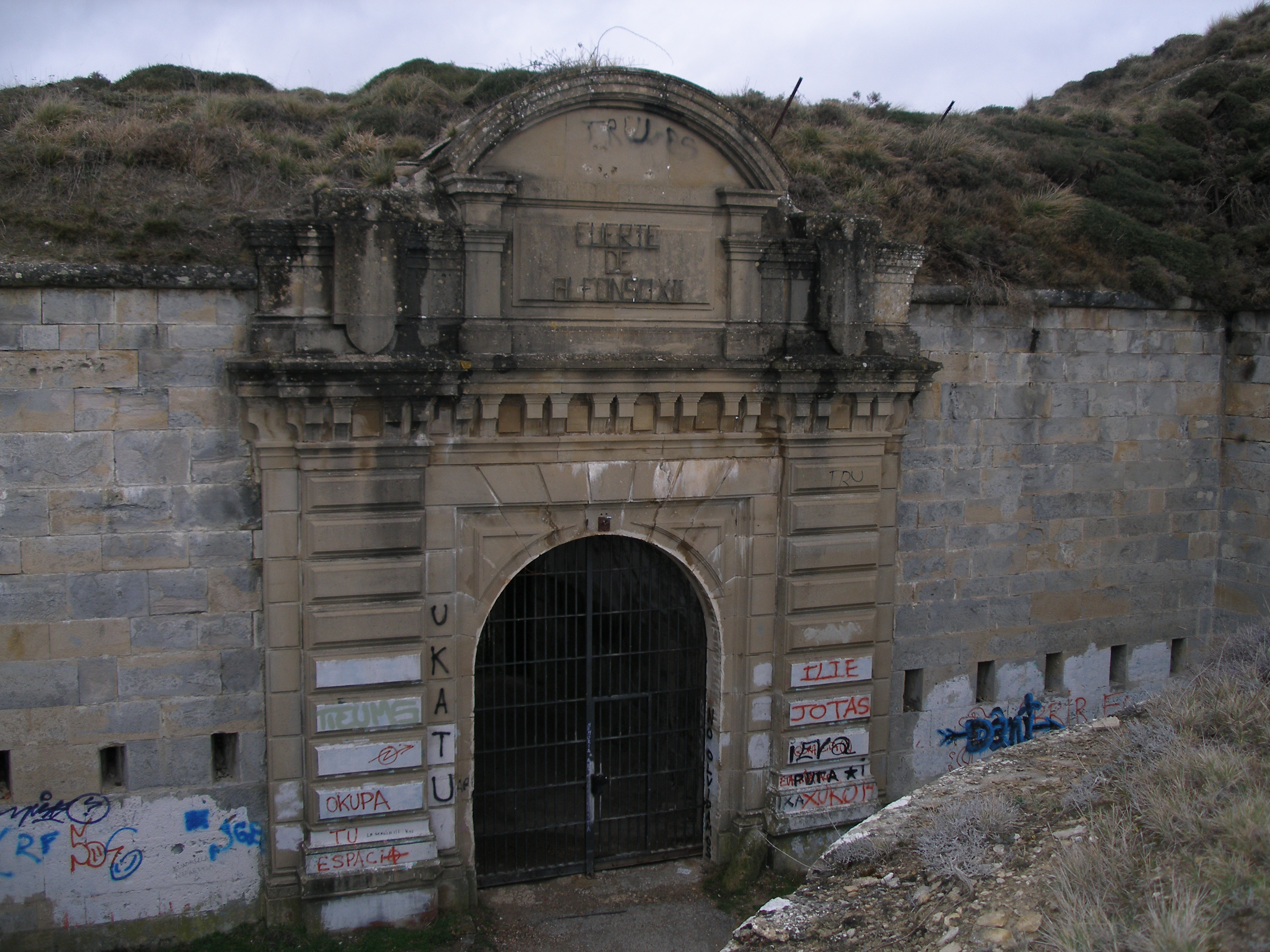
Entrance to the fortification

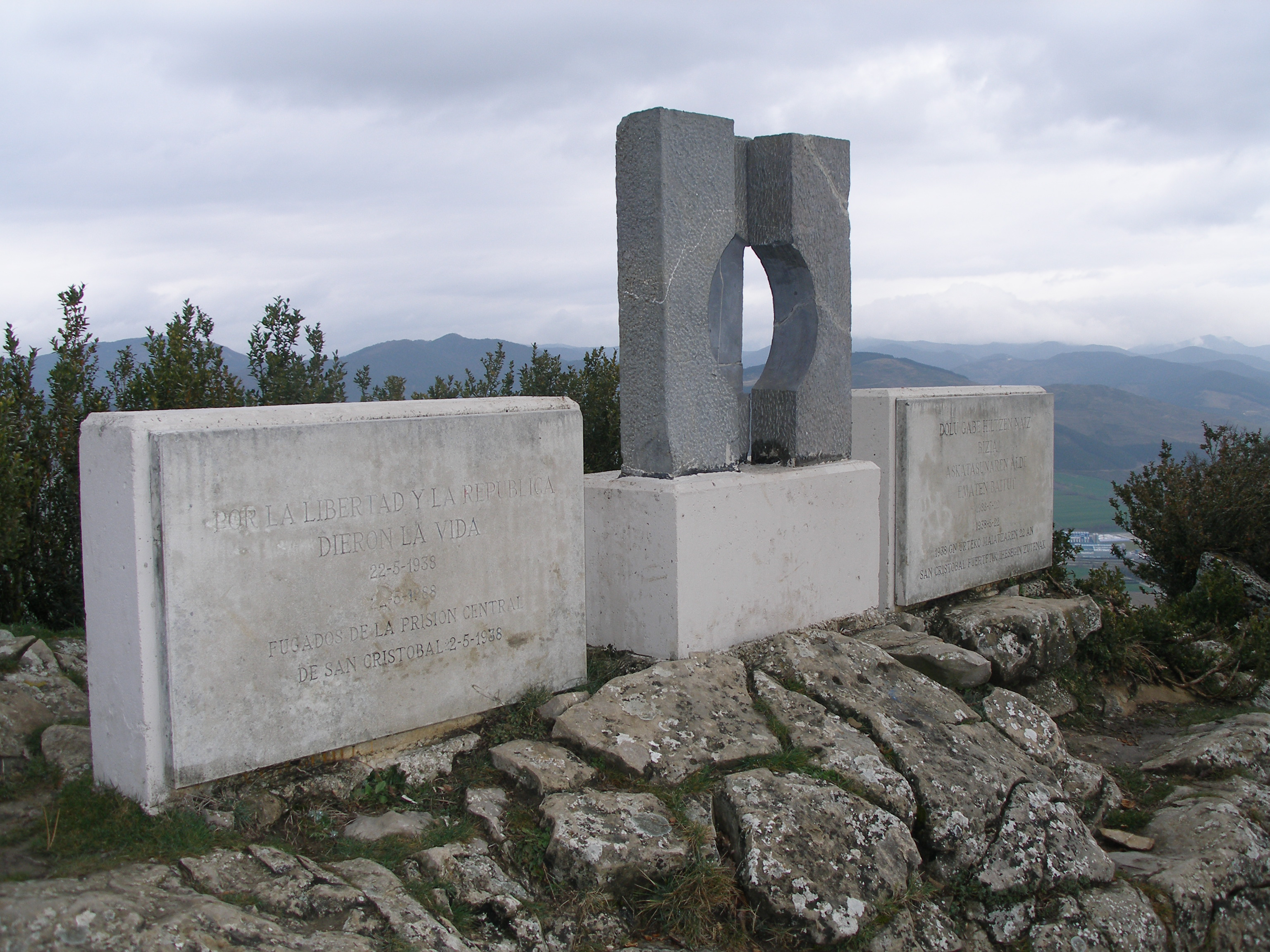
Memorial erected in the surroundings of mount Ezcaba to the victims of the 1936 military uprising, frequently sabotaged and covered with fascist graffiti

The Fort Alfonso XII or San Cristóbal is a fort located on the top of the mount Ezcaba or San Cristóbal (892,8 m above sea level), 4 km from Pamplona, Spain. It was erected following the 1872-1876 Carlist War to control a strategic point towering over Pamplona. It was later made into a makeshift prison during the 2nd Spanish Republic, bearing witness during the Spanish Civil War to a halfhearted massive prison break by leftist prisoners that ended up with the death of hundreds.

== Construction after the 3rd Carlist War ==
It was built after the Carlist War of 1872-1876 because Carlists succeeded to reach Pamplona -controlled by the liberal Government- with their artillery from this and other mountains surrounding Pamplona from the north. The advances in artillery during late 19th century forced the military authorities to build this kind of fortifications in order to control mountains and hills close to important towns. Another example of this is the fort San Marcos, near San Sebastián.

It was built from 1878 to 1919. The top of the mountain was blasted and most of the construction is underground, so it is barely visible from the outside. Its three floors have an extension of 180,000 m^{2}. It is surrounded by a moat and the total extension of the facility is 615,000 m^{2}.

== Fortress turned into prison ==
After the revolution of 1934, nearly 750 revolutionary convicts were imprisoned there. Most of them were amnestied after the electoral win of the left in February 1936. During the early stages of the Civil War (July-September 1936), the military rebels strong in Navarre unleashed a terror campaign against inconvenient, dissenting civilians in the rearguard. The inmate population in the fort rose to more than 2,000.

On May 22, 1938, some prisoners organised a massive prison break. 792 prisoners fled, but unfortunately for the escapees one of the guards sneaked his way to Pamplona, and gave notice. The Nationalist military rebels strong in Navarre went on to organise a manhunt, with only three managing to get to the French border; 585 were arrested, 211 were shot dead. Fourteen of the arrested who were considered the leaders were sentenced to death. Most fugitives were intercepted during the following days. The Nationalist military were quick to rule out the political nature of the escapees, labelling them as "fugitives of the worst kind."

Those living through the military operation were brought back to the fort, imprisoned, and left to die of famine and disease, totalling more than 400. In 1988, a sculpture was erected to honour the memory of the Republicans who died there. The fort ceased to be a prison in 1945.

The Ministry of Defence still owns the facility although the last troops left it in 1991. Although there has been several projects for recovering the fort and giving it a new use and in 2001 it was decreed "good of cultural interest", it remains today abandoned and ruinous.
