= San Cristóbal de La Paz =

San Cristóbal de La Paz was a fortress in Chile that was established in 1621 by Governor Cristóbal de la Cerda y Sotomayor. It was located five or six kilometers to the southwest of Yumbel on the west shore of the Claro River to the north of its confluence with the Laja River. In 1646 a mission and a small church was established that grew into a settlement with a few inhabitants. In February 1655, both the fort and settlement were destroyed by the Mapuche, and it was reestablished in 1663, under the temporary governor Ángel de Peredo. This settlement lasted until the Mapuche rising of 1766, when it was abandoned and never rebuilt.

== Sources ==
- Francisco Solano Asta-Buruaga y Cienfuegos, Diccionario geográfico de la República de Chile, SEGUNDA EDICIÓN CORREGIDA Y AUMENTADA, NUEVA YORK, D. APPLETON Y COMPAÑÍA. 1899. Pg. 692 San Cristóbal
- Diego Barros Arana, Historia general de Chile, Tomo cuarto, Capítulo V, pg.169-170.
