= Geronimo Cristobal Jr. =

Filipino writer and painter

- Born: Geronimo Factoran Cristobal Jr. 1992 (age 33–34); Philippines
- Education: Cornell University
- Occupations: Writer, Art Historian
- Website: www.geronimocristobal.com

Geronimo Cristobal is a Filipino art historian.
