= Macolod Corridor =

Geological feature in the Philippines

The Macolod Corridor is a northeast-trending zone of active volcanism situated at the junction of different tectonic elements in southwestern Luzon, Philippines. It is approximately 40 km wide and perpendicularly bisects the Luzon Volcanic Arc. The corridor is bounded by two major faults, the Philippine Fault to the east and the Sibuyan-Verde Passage Fault to the west.

The Macolod Corridor is a relatively young feature, with volcanic activity dating back to the Quaternary (less than 2.58 million years ago). The corridor is home to several active volcanoes, including Taal Volcano, one of the most active volcanoes in the Philippines.

The tectonic setting of the Macolod Corridor is complex and not fully understood. Several models have been proposed to explain its formation, but no single model is universally accepted. One model suggests that the corridor is a rift zone formed by crustal extension. Another model suggests that the corridor is a pull-apart zone formed by the interaction of the Philippine Fault and the Sibuyan-Verde Passage Fault.

The Macolod Corridor is an important geological feature for several reasons. First, it is a zone of active volcanism, which poses a significant hazard to the surrounding population. Second, the corridor is located at the junction of several tectonic elements, which makes it an ideal place to study the tectonic processes that affect the Philippines. Third, the corridor is home to a variety of unique geological features, such as maars, tuff cones, and lava flows.
