= Coatli =

Coatli is a Nahuatl word meaning "water serpent" or "serpent water" and is the name for several medicinal plants, it can refer to:

- Eysenhardtia polystachya, the Mexican kidneywood or palo cuate, used as a traditional diuretic by the Aztec people
  - Lignum nephriticum, the European name for the traditional diuretic derived from Eysenhardtia polystachya and Pterocarpus indicus
- Jatropha dioica, the leatherstem or sangre de drago
- Moringa oleifera, the horseradish tree or moringa

== See also ==
- Coatl, a Nahuatl word meaning "serpent" or "twin"
