= Hinulugang Taktak =

Waterfall and protected landscape in Rizal, Philippines

Hinulugang Taktak Protected Landscape
- IUCN category V (protected landscape/seascape)
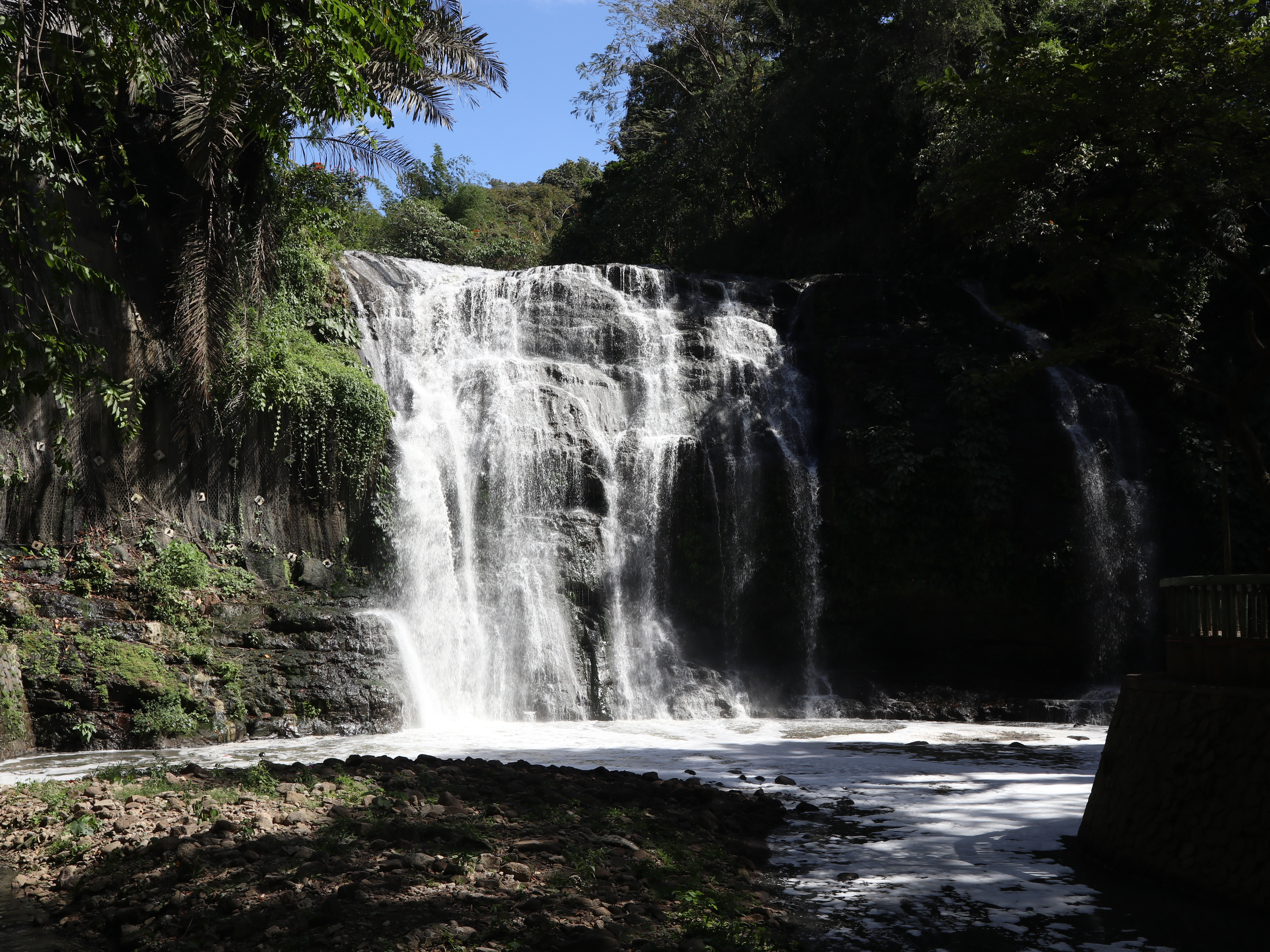
- Hinulugang Taktak waterfalls

- Location within Luzon Location within Philippines
- Location: Rizal, Philippines
- Nearest city: Antipolo
- Coordinates: 14°35′41″N 121°10′03″E
- Area: 3.2 hectares (7.9 acres)
- Established: 15 July 1952 (Recreation area); 18 September 1990 (National park); 17 November 2000 (Protected landscape)
- Visitors: 843,000 (in 2018)
- Governing body: Rizal Provincial Government; Department of Environment and Natural Resources

Hinulugang Taktak Protected Landscape, also known as Hinulugan Taktak, is a protected area in Rizal, Philippines. Initially assigned as a recreation area, the waterfall area has been designated as a national park by virtue of Republic Act No. 6964 in 1990. Ten years later, it became a protected landscape under Proclamation No. 412. It is managed by the Department of Environment and Natural Resources and the Rizal Provincial Government.

== History ==
Hinulugang Taktak in 1911

Folk knowledge has it that the name was derived from a large bell (taktak) that was thrown (hinulog) into the falls during the 15th or 16th century because the local villagers considered it too loud. Since then, it has become known as Hinulugang Taktak or the place where the bell fell. One of Antipolo's iconic destinations, the other being the Antipolo Cathedral, Hinulugang Taktak features in the hymn Antipolo composed by German San Jose in 1929. The lyrics indicate that even back then it was a popular recreational area.

On 15 July 1952, five lots with a total area of 0.85 hectares (2.1 acres) were reserved as a recreation area under the administration of the Antipolo Municipal Government. The largest lot came from the property of James O'Hara and Concepcion Francisco, while the rest came from the properties of Concepcion Leyba y Banson and the Manila Railroad Company. Beginning in the 1960s, the waters have gradually become polluted. To stop the degradation of the falls, it was designated as a national park on 18 September 1990. As part of its conversion into a national park, the reserved area was increased to 3.2 hectares (7.9 acres). The rehabilitation began as early as 1991. Seven years later, up to 75 per cent of the area has been restored at a cost exceeding 45 million pesos.

On 17 November 2000, it became a protected landscape under Proclamation No. 412, effectively transferring its administration to the Department of Environment and Natural Resources and the Rizal Provincial Government. It also mandated the use of the trust fund through the Integrated Protected Area Fund System to add to the limited funding for the park from the national government. Renewed efforts were made to rehabilitate the area in 2009, with an initial three-year budget of 100 million pesos, and in 2013. However, an oil spill in 2015 forced the closure of the park, followed by rehabilitation efforts. Private institutions also helped in the restoration, including photo exhibits, bamboo planting and other re-greening efforts in the area. Eleven days after the oil spill, the park was reopened to visitors.

Hinulugang Taktak was declared a national park under Republic Act No. 11038 (Expanded National Integrated Protected Areas System Act of 2018), signed by President Rodrigo Duterte in July 2018. On 13 February 2020, Hinulugang Taktak reopened to the public after a long year of rehabilitation and featured recreational activities, including a spider web platform, hanging bridges, and a wall climbing facility.

== Geography and geology ==
Located around 1.7 kilometres (1.1 mi) from the Antipolo Cathedral, the falls can be accessed through Taktak Road. The park contains the headwaters of the Sapang Baho River (also known as Antipolo River and Taktak River), which flows to Laguna de Bay through the Manggahan Floodway. Due to the accumulated water pollution, it was deemed unsafe for recreational purposes such as swimming. The falls have a height of 21.5 meters (70.5 feet) and a width of 25.8 meters (84.6 feet). The rocks beneath the Quaternary soil are Miocene layers. However, the area is susceptible to erosion, landslides, and earthquakes.

== Biology and ecology ==
At least 11 species of trees can be found in the area, including Senna spectabilis, Cananga odorata, Swietenia macrophylla, Pterocarpus indicus, Chrysophyllum cainito, Artocarpus heterophyllus, Persea americana, Sandoricum koetjape, Mangifera indica, Averrhoa bilimbi, and Cocos nucifera. While there is no report of endemic or endangered species present, animal species in the area include Varanus salvator, Python reticulatus, and Draco volans.

== Recreation ==
Starting in 2002, facilities began to be built as part of the continuing rehabilitation effort. Due to water pollution, the river itself was deemed unsafe for swimming. As an alternative, a nearby pool was constructed for swimmers. Private resorts and hotels have also been built near the area. Since its designation as a national park and its consequent rehabilitation, visitors have steadily increased from 45,563 in 1995 to 83,431 in 2004. This raised the profile of Hinulugang Taktak as the nation's second most popular national park, following the Ninoy Aquino Parks and Wildlife Center. As of 2008, it recorded the third largest income for any protected area in the Philippines with 11.1 million pesos, following the Ninoy Aquino Parks and Wildlife Center (first) and the Mount Apo Natural Park (second).

== Gallery ==
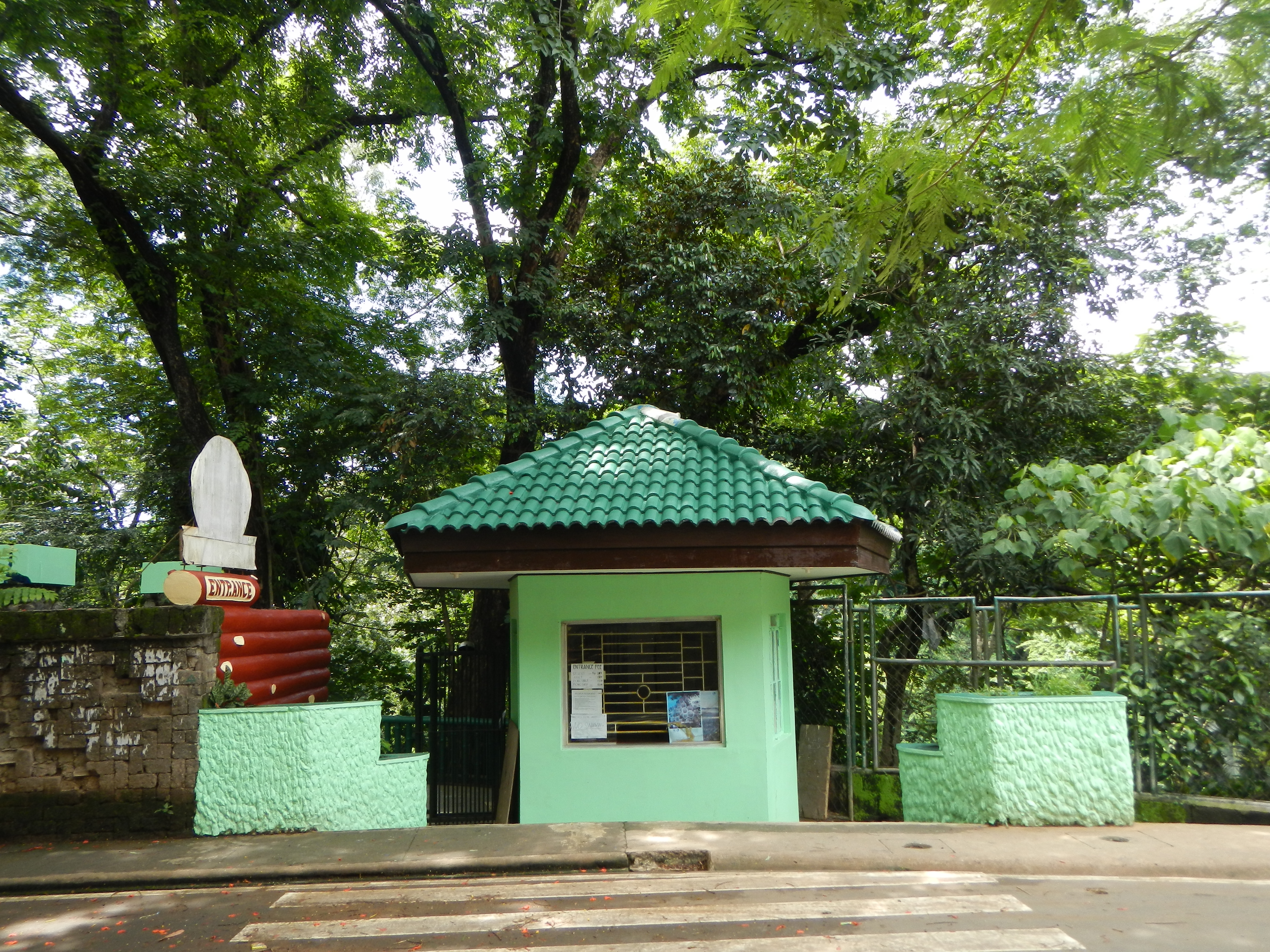
Park entrance

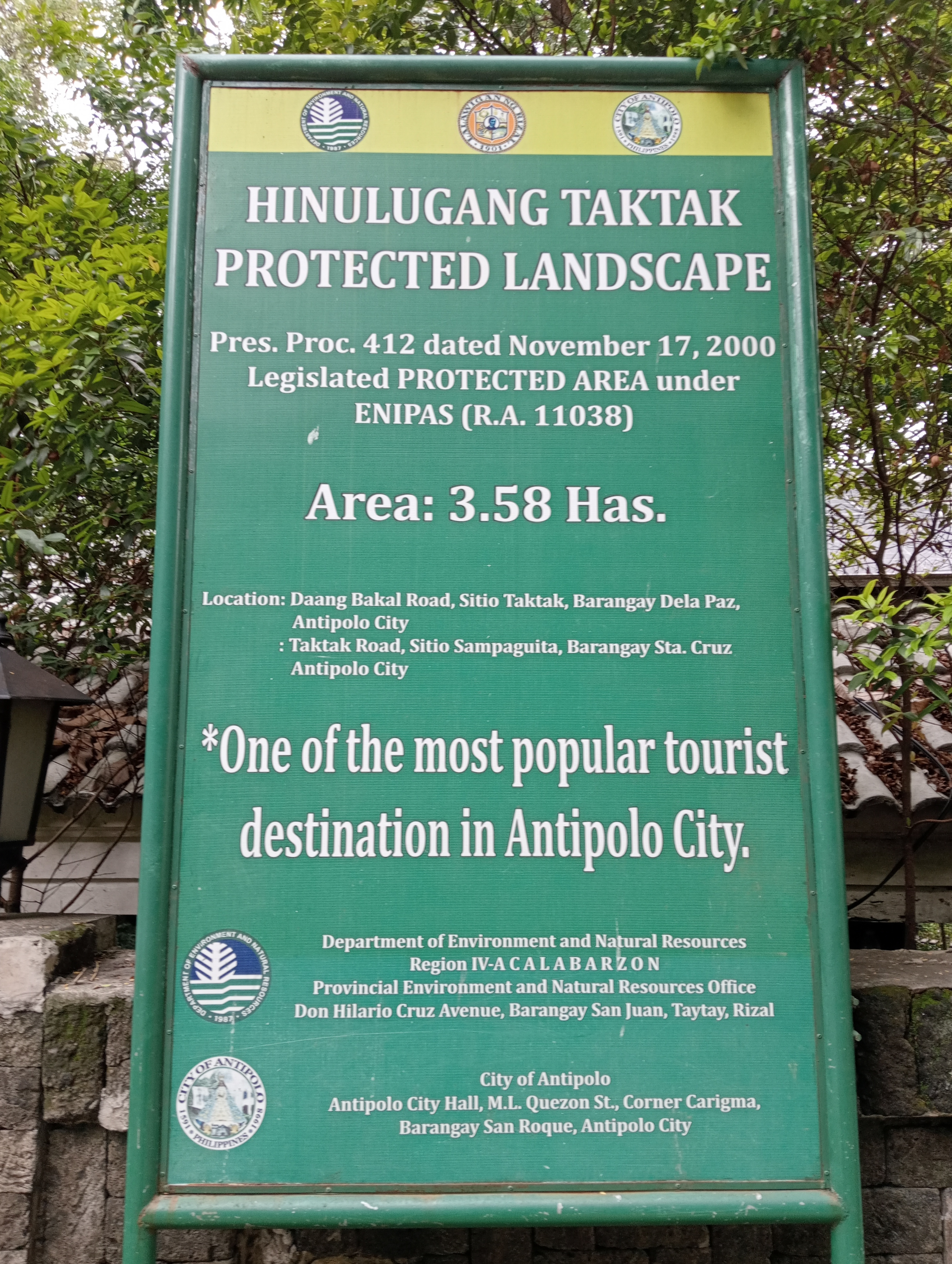
Signage

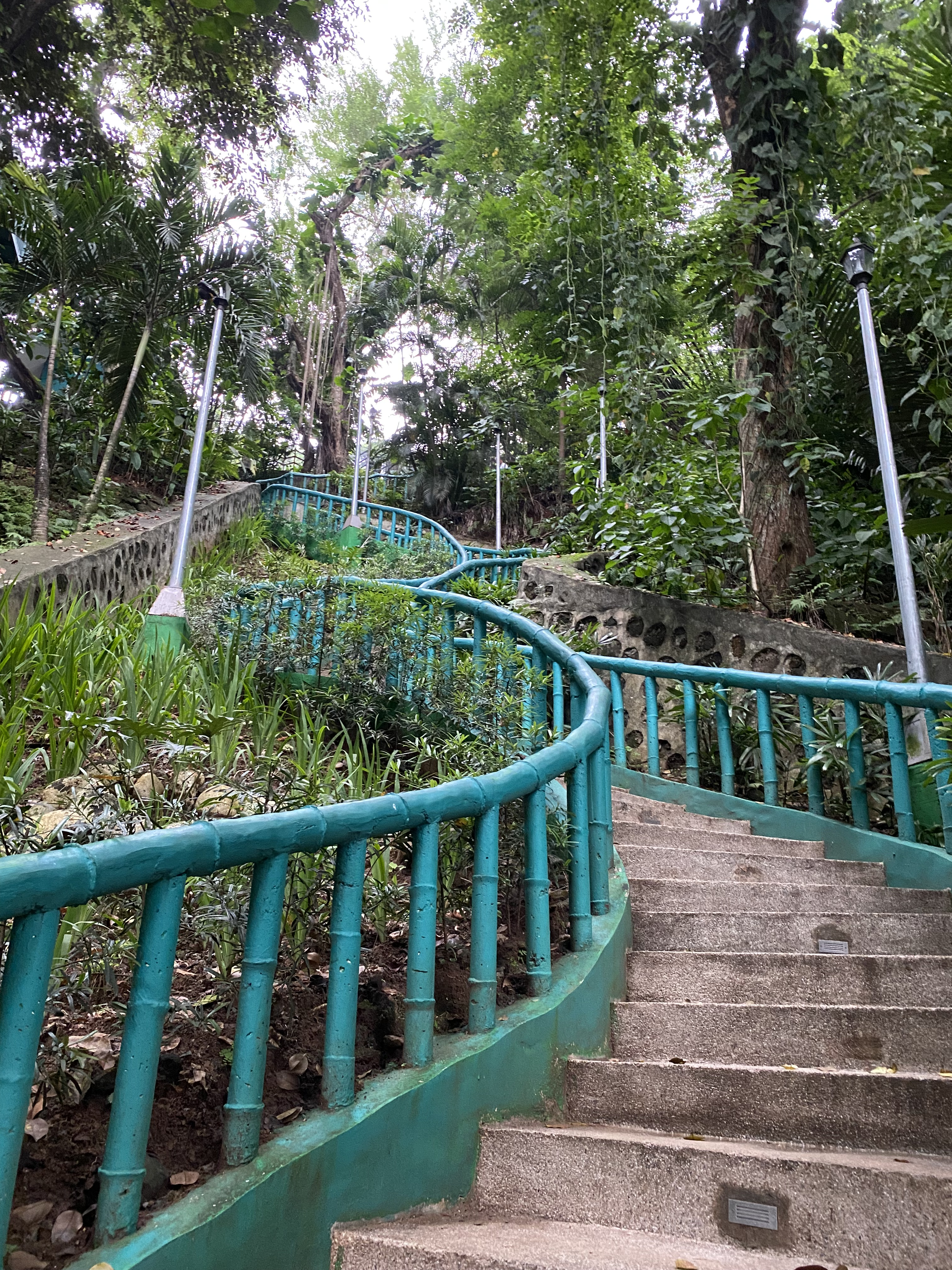
Stairway leading downwards from the park entrance into the bottom of the waterfalls

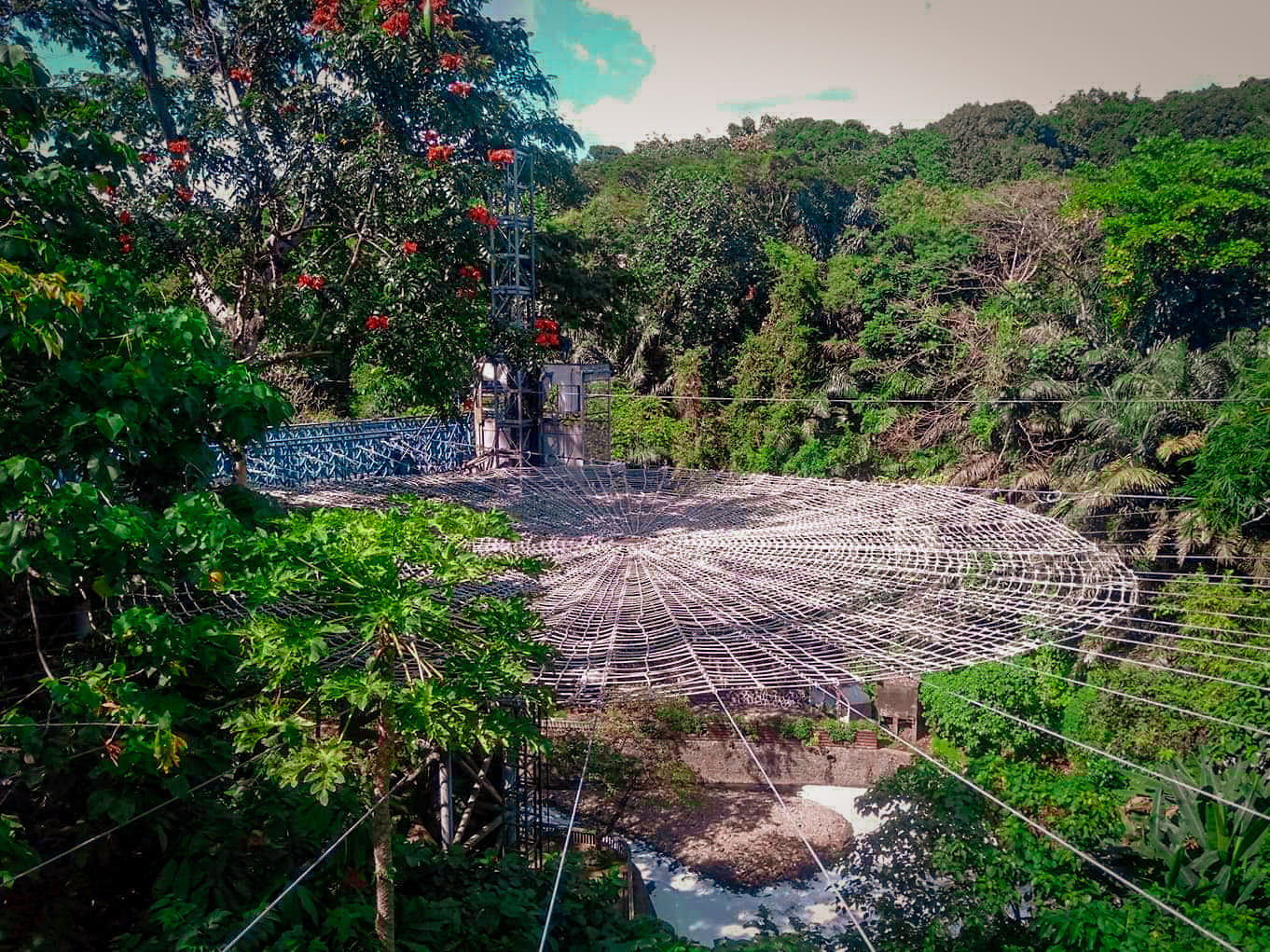
Spider web platform structure

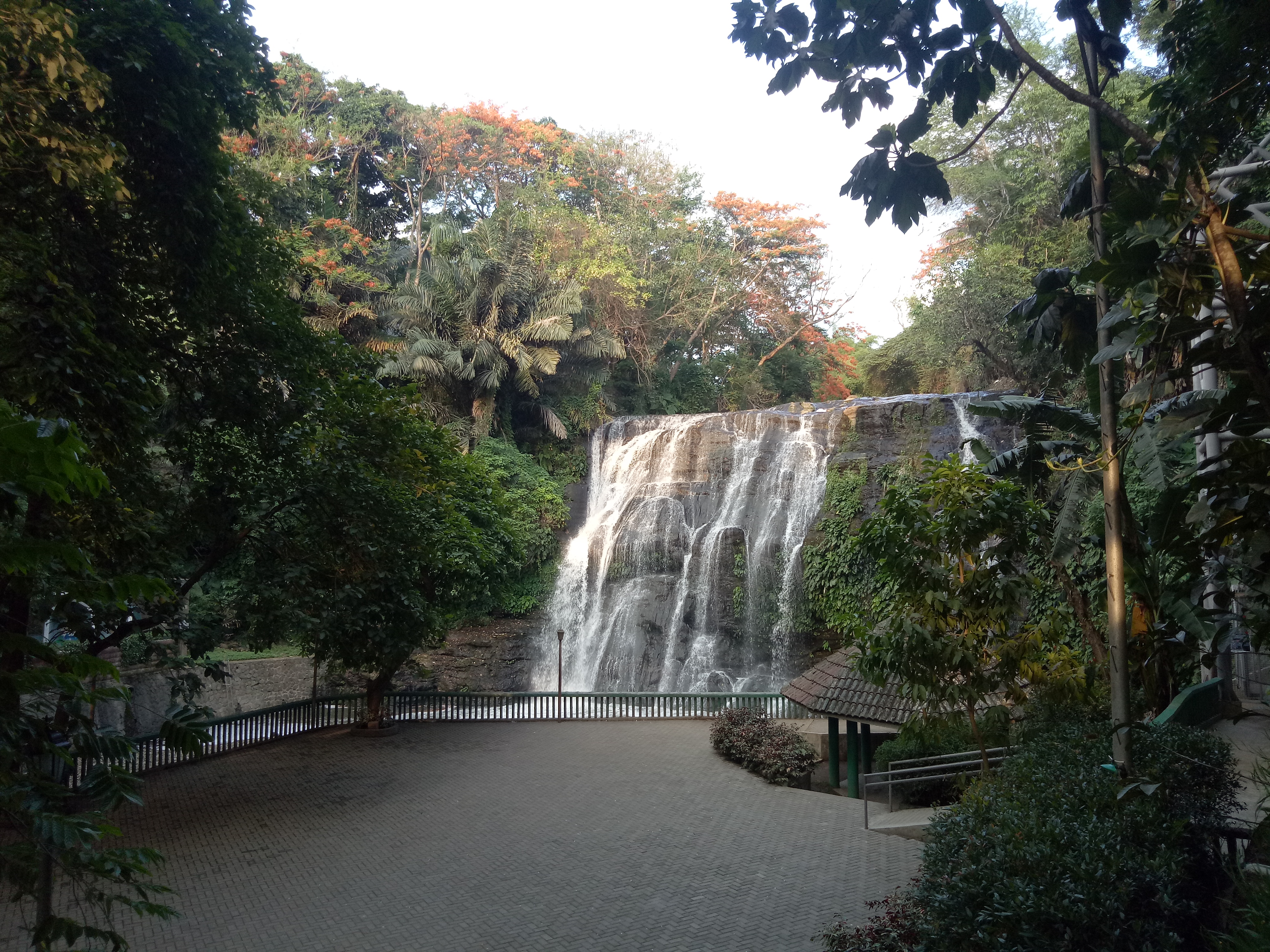
Viewing deck

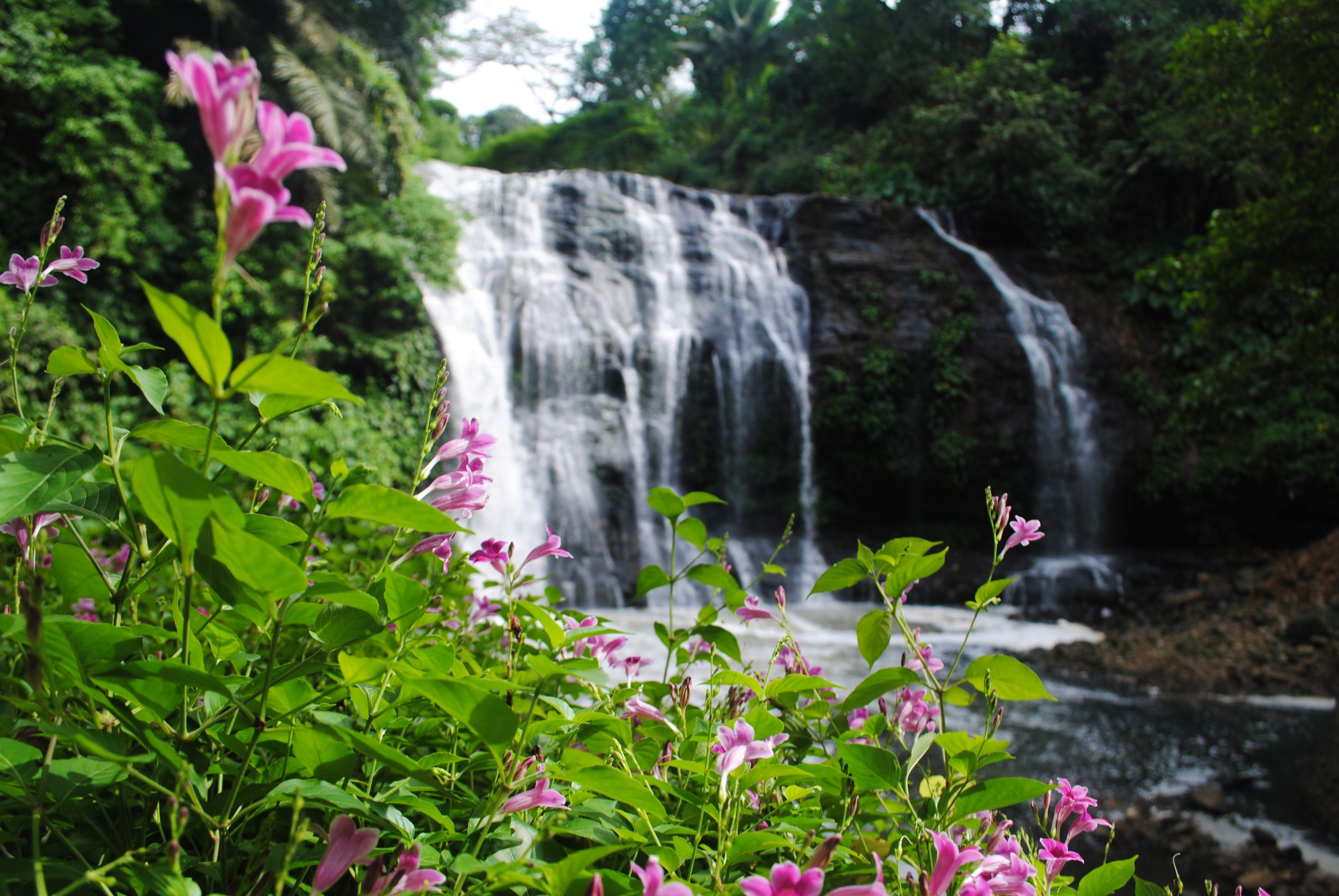
Vegetation within the park

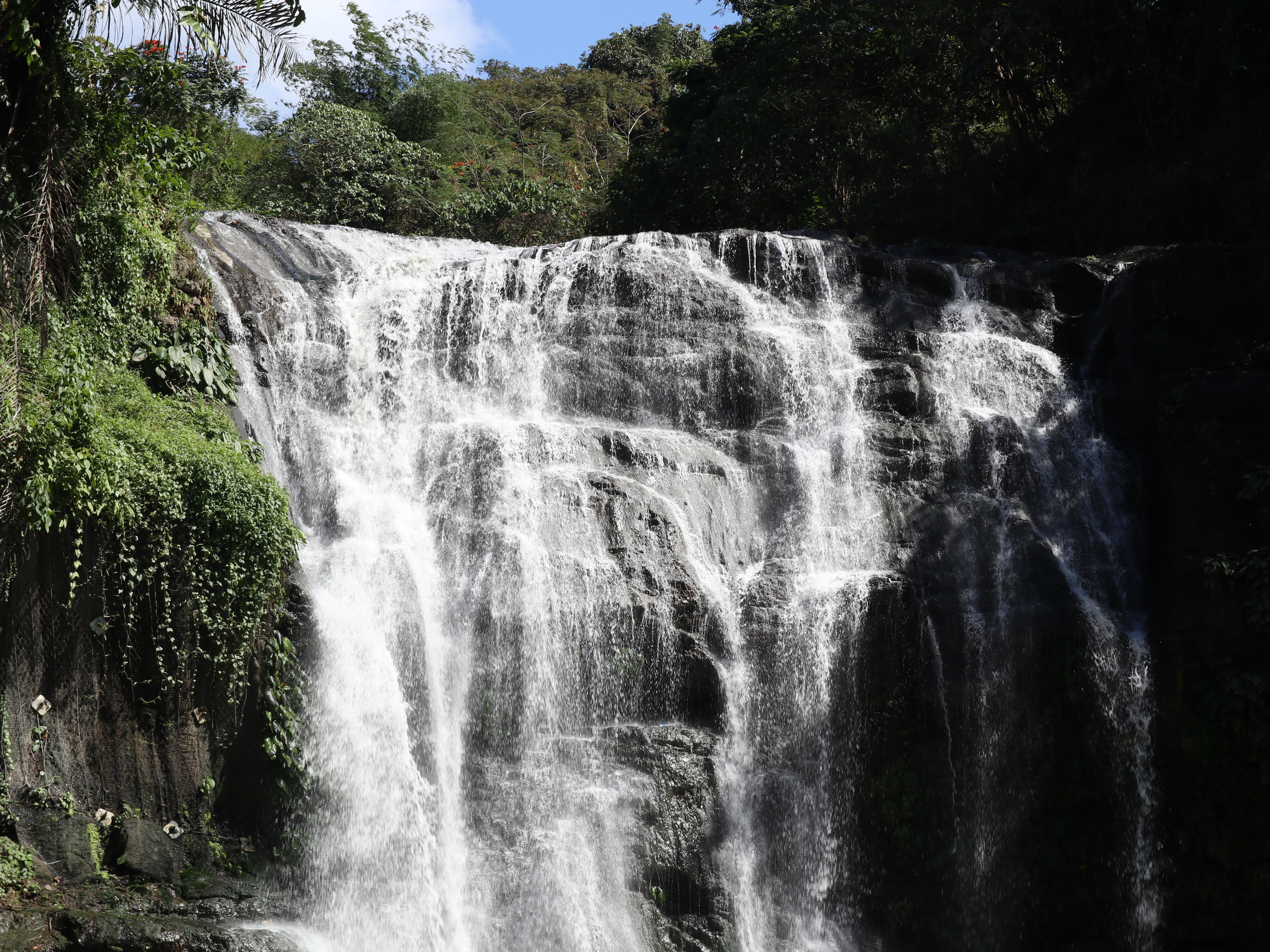
Closeup of falls

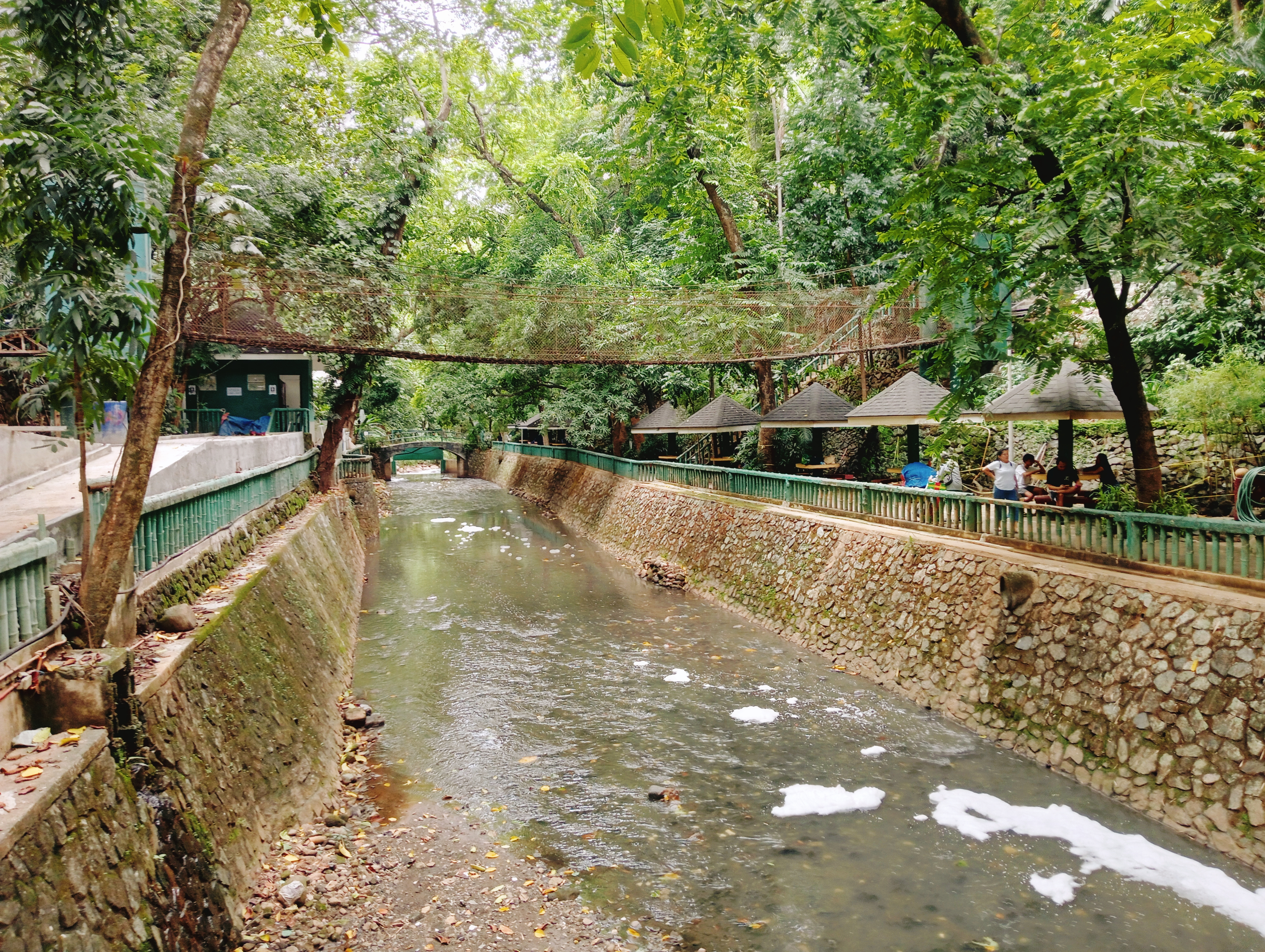
River leading from the falls

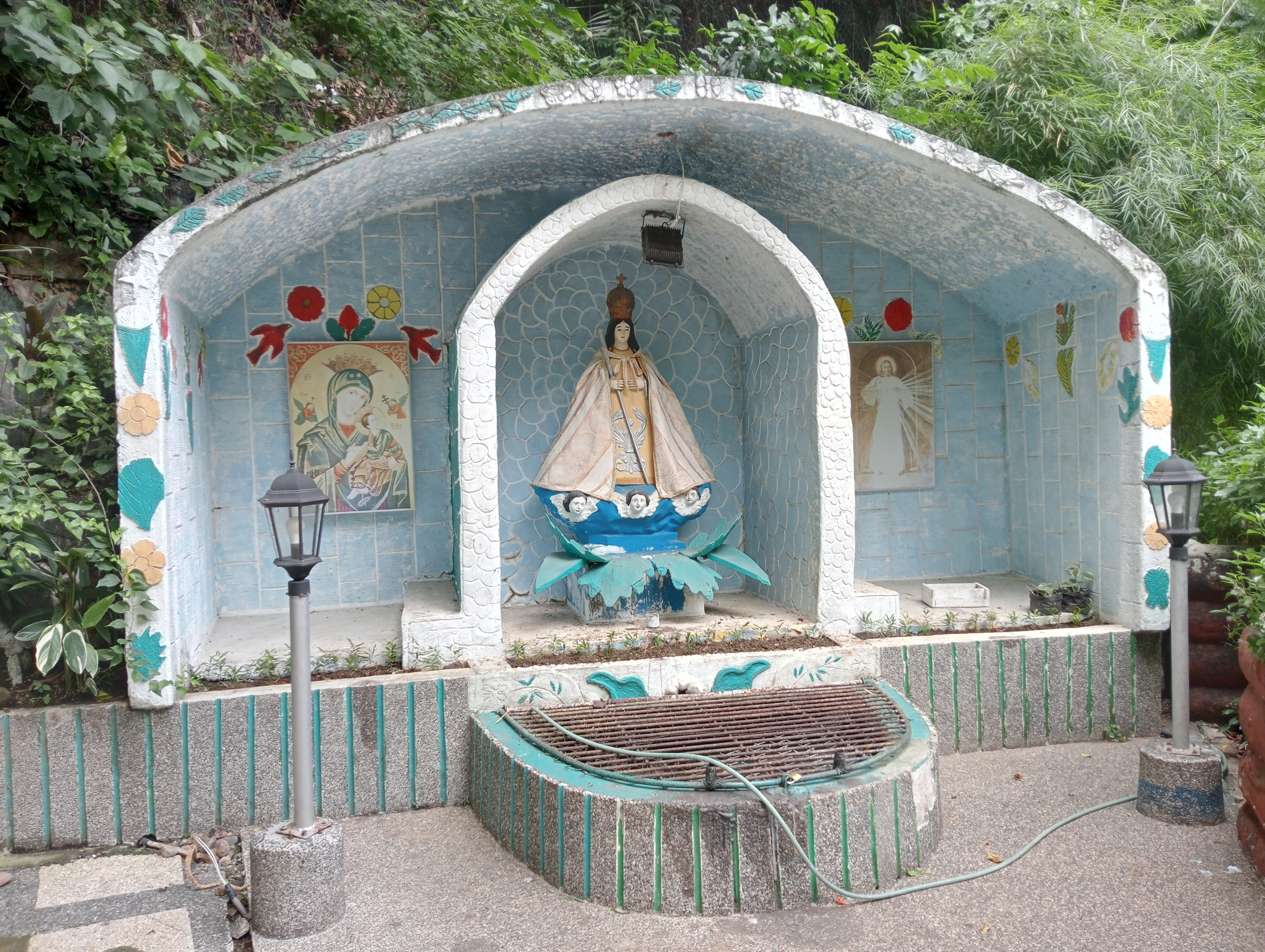
An altar within the park

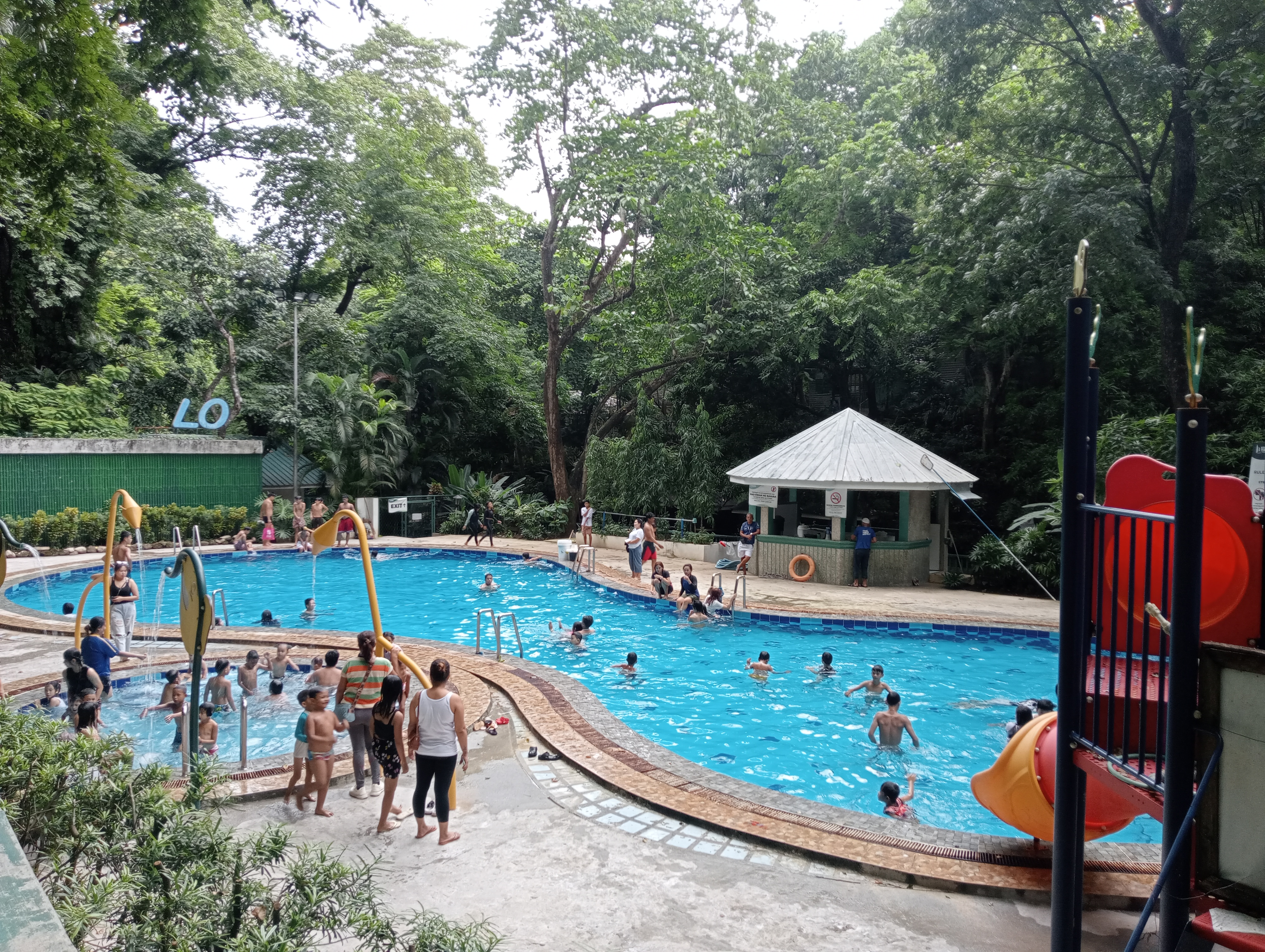
Swimming pool

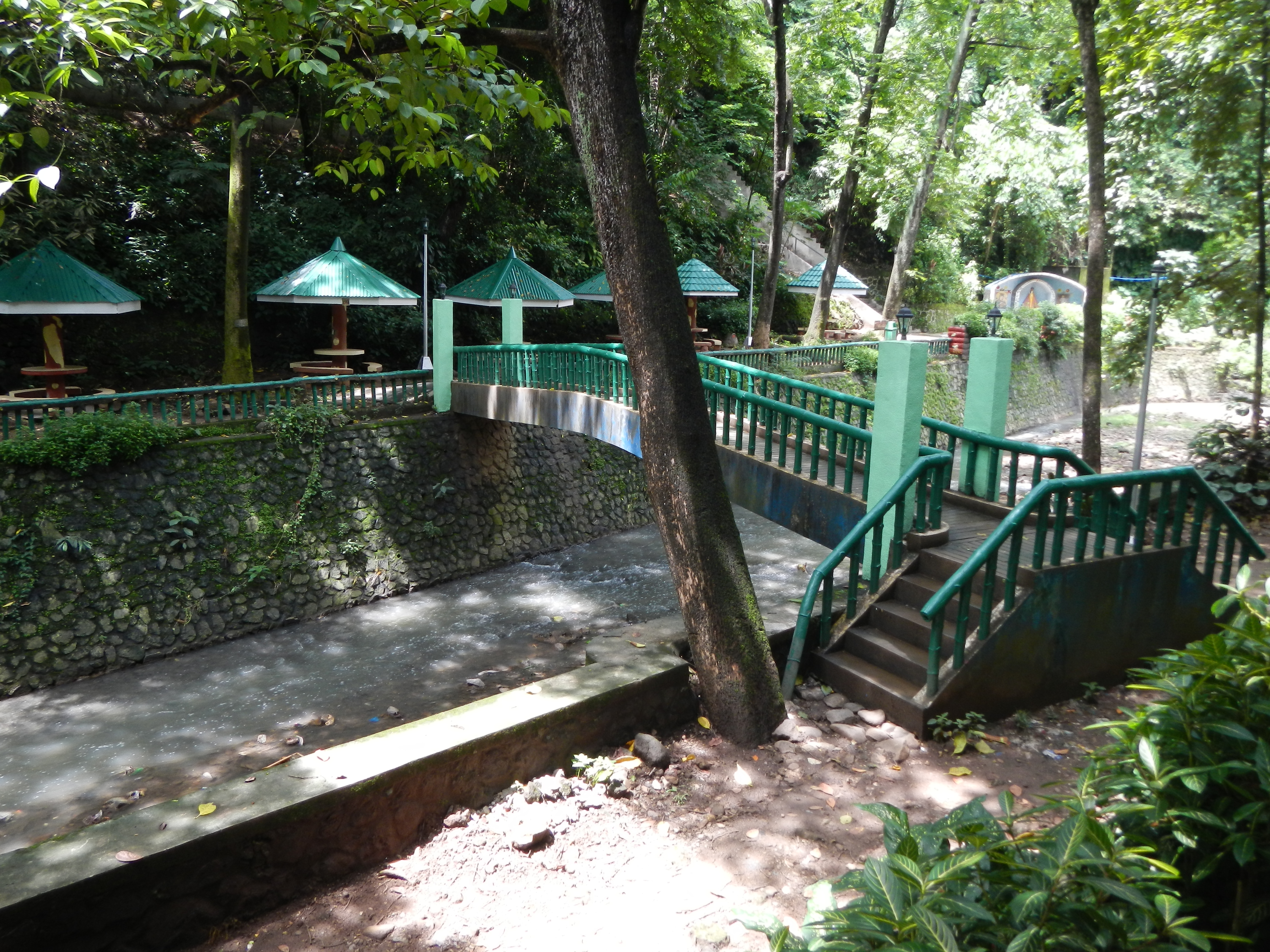
A bridge within the park

== See also ==
- List of waterfalls
