= Coatl =

Coatl (also spelled cohuatl, couatl, or cuatl) is a Nahuatl word meaning "serpent" (modern Nahuatl pronunciation). It is the name of one of the day-signs in the Aztec calendar. It may also refer to:

- Coatl, a character from the 1945 novel, Captain from Castile (novel)
  - Also appears in the 1947 film adaptation, Captain from Castile
- Couatl (Dungeons & Dragons), a type of creature in the Dungeons & Dragons fantasy roleplaying game
- Coatl (wood), a type of wood also used in traditional medicine
- Lamborghini Coatl, a Lamborghini concept vehicle

== See also ==
- Coatli (disambiguation), a Nahuatl word referring to several medicinal plants
- Quetzalcoatl, the Aztec deity whose name means "feathered serpent"
