= Sapang Baho River =

River in Luzon, Philippines

Coordinates: 14°33′N 121°06′E

- Location within Luzon Location within Philippines

Location
- Country: Philippines
- Region: Calabarzon; National Capital Region
- Province: Rizal
- Cities: Marikina

Physical characteristics
- Source: Taktak River
  - location: Antipolo
- 2nd source: Hakbangan Creek
  - location: Marikina
- Mouth: Laguna de Bay (via the Manggahan Floodway)
  - elevation: less than 2 meters (6.6 ft) above sea level

Basin features
- Progression: Sapang Baho–Manggahan Floodway–Laguna de Bay

The Sapang Baho River is a river system that runs through Rizal Province and Marikina in the Philippines. The name, when literally translated, means "smelly creek". It is one of 21 tributaries of Laguna de Bay and is regularly monitored by the Laguna Lake Development Authority (LLDA) through one of its 15 river monitoring stations. Among its headwaters are the Hinulugang Taktak falls on the Taktak River in Antipolo city, once a famed tourist destination in the days before urbanization and pollution.

== Location, mouth and headwaters ==
The Sapang Baho river originates in the mountains of Rizal province, including upper portions of the city of Marikina, which has since become part of the Metro Manila. Its mouth, which once released water directly into Laguna de Bay, has been obscured by the construction of the Manggahan Floodway, into whose East bank it now drains at the barangay of San Francisco, Cainta, somewhere near San Francisco Elementary School.

The portion of the river cut off by the floodway still exists, visible at the opposite bank of the floodway at the Greenwoods Executive Village in Cainta, and ending at the original rivermouth where the shore of Taytay, Rizal meets Laguna de Bay.

The main body of the river actually meanders only a short distance between Taytay and Cainta, Rizal, where it branches out into smaller creeks at Village East Subdivision, near the LLDA water sampling station.

Creeks further upstream which serve as the headwaters of the Sapang Baho include (from West to East): Hakbangan Creek in Marikina; a creek at Barangay Mayamot, Antipolo; and furthest to the Southeast, the Taktak River and Hinulugang Taktak falls in Antipolo.

== Monitoring and Conservation ==
In the December 2005 Water Quality Status Report listed on the LLDA's site, the Sapang Baho River was listed as "worse than Class D" with very low % Dissolved Oxygen saturation. It also indicated that this status had been "maintained" since the river was last monitored.

According to the Department of Environment and Natural Resources's Water Usage & Classification for Fresh Water, Class D Quality freshwater is suitable for agriculture, irrigation, livestock watering and industrial water supply class II. "Worse than Class D" means that the Sapang Bato is not usable for any of these functions.

The Sapang Baho has been noted to have a blue color which has been attributed to dissolved matter. This mixes with the water in Manggahan Floodway, and from there to the Lake.

== See also ==
- Laguna de Bay
- Laguna Lake Development Authority
