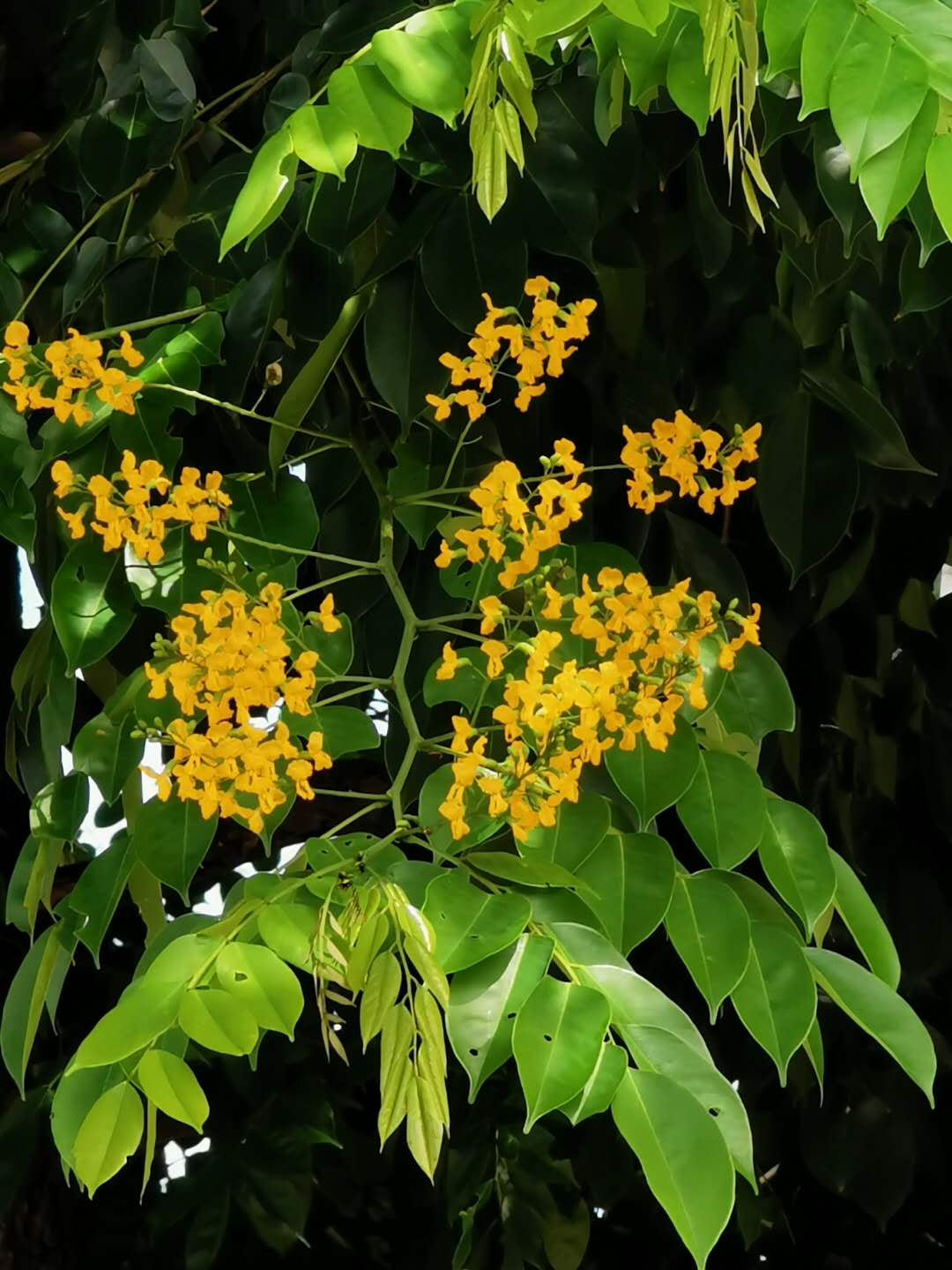
- Foliage and flowers of Pterocarpus indicus in Kinmen, Fuchien Province, Republic of China

Conservation status
- Endangered (IUCN 3.1)

Scientific classification
- Kingdom: Plantae
- Clade: Tracheophytes
- Clade: Angiosperms
- Clade: Eudicots
- Clade: Rosids
- Order: Fabales
- Family: Fabaceae
- Subfamily: Faboideae
- Genus: Pterocarpus
- Species: P. indicus

Binomial name
- Pterocarpus indicus Willd.

Synonyms
- List: Echinodiscus echinatus Miq.; Lingoum echinatum (Pers.) Kuntze; Lingoum indicum (Willd.) Kuntze; Lingoum rubrum Rumph.; Lingoum saxatile Rumph.; Lingoum wallichii Pierre; Pterocarpus blancoi Merr.; Pterocarpus carolinensis Kaneh.; Pterocarpus echinata Pers.; Pterocarpus indica Willd. [Spelling variant]; Pterocarpus klemmei Merr.; Pterocarpus obtusatus Miq.; Pterocarpus pallidus Blanco; Pterocarpus papuana F. Muell.; Pterocarpus papuanus F.Muell.; Pterocarpus pubescens Merr.; Pterocarpus vidalianus Rolfe; Pterocarpus wallichii Wight & Arn.; Pterocarpus zollingeri Miq.

= Pterocarpus indicus =

Species of legume

Pterocarpus indicus (commonly known as Amboyna wood, Malay padauk, Papua New Guinea rosewood, Philippine mahogany, Andaman redwood, Burmese rosewood, narra (from Tagalog) and asana in the Philippines, angsana, or Pashu padauk) is a species of Pterocarpus in the family Fabaceae native to southeastern Asia, northern Australasia, and the western Pacific Ocean islands, in Cambodia, southernmost China, East Timor, Indonesia, Malaysia, Papua New Guinea, the Philippines, the Ryukyu Islands, the Solomon Islands, Thailand, and Vietnam.

Pterocarpus indicus was one of two species (the other being Eysenhardtia polystachya) used as a source for the 16th- to 18th-century traditional diuretic known as lignum nephriticum.

Many populations of Pterocarpus indicus are seriously threatened. It is extinct in Vietnam and possibly in Sri Lanka and Peninsular Malaysia. It was declared the national tree of the Philippines in 1934 by Governor-General Frank Murphy of the Insular Government of the Philippine Islands through Proclamation No. 652.

== Description ==
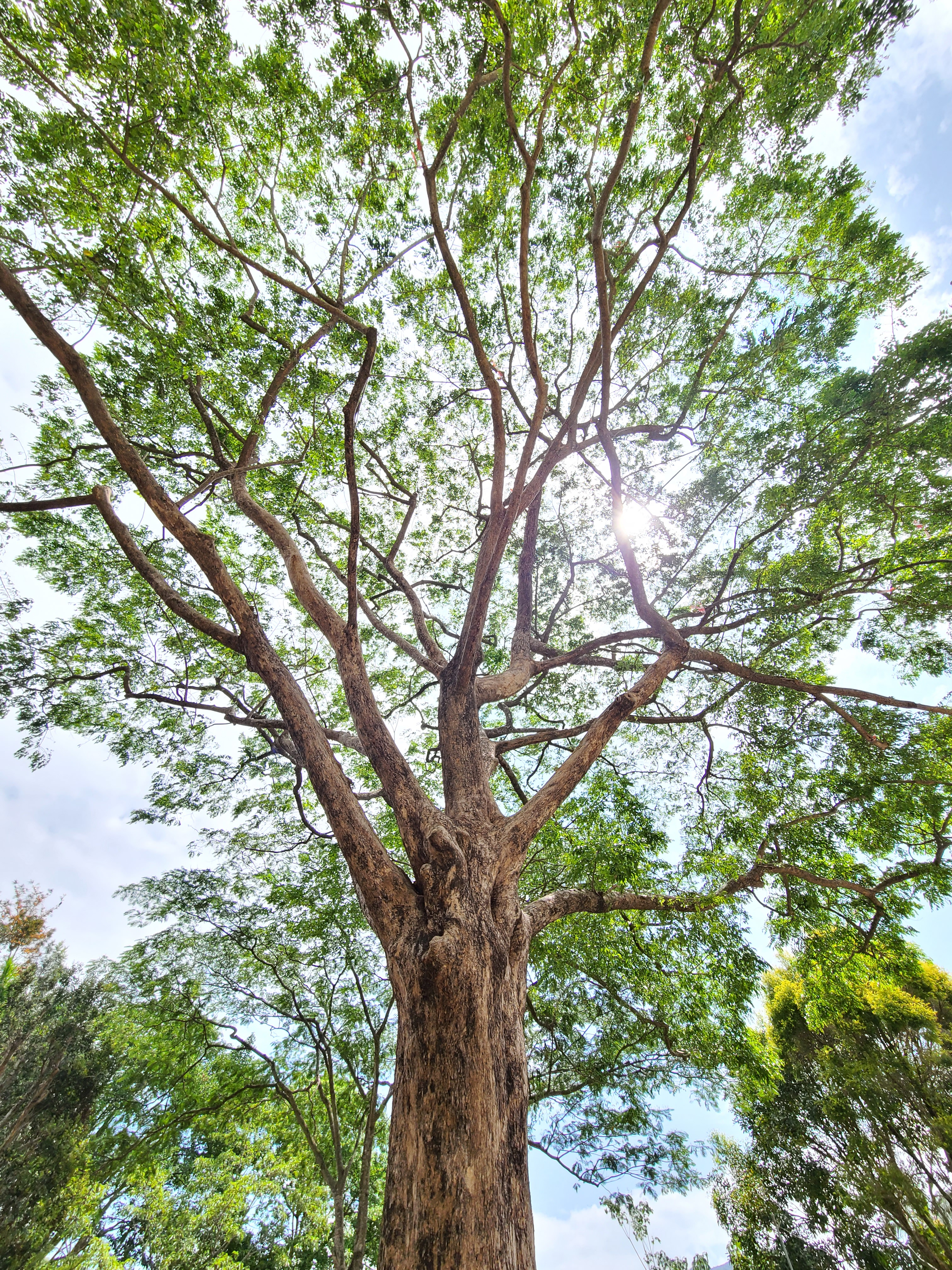
A mature specimen in Hong Kong

It is a large deciduous tree growing to 30–40 m tall, with a trunk up to 2 m diameter, and the crown is 12–34 m wide. The leaves are 12–22 cm long, pinnate, with 5–11 leaflets. Most Pterocarpus species prefer seasonal weather but P. indicus prefer rainforests.

The flowers are produced in panicles 6–13 cm long containing a few to numerous flowers; flowering is from February to May in the Philippines, Borneo and the Malay peninsula. They are slightly fragrant and have yellow or orange-yellow petals. The fruit is a semiorbicular pod 2–3 cm diameter, surrounded by a flat 4–6 cm diameter membranaceous wing (wing-like structure) which aids dispersal by the wind. It contains one or two seeds, and does not split open at maturity; it ripens within 4–6 years, and becomes purple when dry. The central part of the pod can be smooth (f. indica), bristly (f. echinatus (Pers.) Rojo) or intermediate.

Note: Pterocarpus macrocarpus, a similar species native to Burma, is referred to as "Rosewood" throughout southeast Asia. P. macrocarpus is usually harder than P. indicus. When in burl form, both are referred to as "Amboyna burl".

== Uses ==
The hardwood, which is purplish, is termite-resistant and rose-scented. The wood known in Indonesia as amboyna is the burl of the tree, named after Ambon, where much of this material was originally found. Often amboyna is finely sliced to produce an extremely decorative veneer, used for decoration and in making of furniture and keys on a marimba.

It is a premium timber species suitable for high grade furniture, timber and plywood for light construction purposes. It is also used for cartwheels, wood carving and musical instruments.

The flower is used as a honey source while leaf infusions are used as shampoos. Both flowers and leaves were said to be eaten. The leaves are supposedly good for waxing and polishing brass and copper. It is also a source of kino or resin.

The leaves of narra are also used in traditional medicine to treat a variety of health problems. Narra leaves contain flavonoids. Flavonoids are antioxidants that provide health benefits to humans, such as anti-inflammatory and anti-allergic benefits. Flavonoids in narra leaves may be capable of preventing damage to your kidneys.

In folk medicine, it is used to combat tumours. This property might be due to an acidic polypeptide found in its leaves that inhibited growth of Ehrlich ascites carcinoma cells by disruption of cell and nuclear membranes. It was also one of the sources of lignum nephriticum, a diuretic in Europe during the 16th to 18th centuries. Its reputation is due to its wood infusions, which are fluorescent.

The tree is recommended as an ornamental tree for avenues and is sometimes planted in Puerto Rico as a shade and ornament. The tall, dome-shaped crown, with long, drooping branches is very attractive and the flowers are spectacular in areas with a dry season. It is very easily propagated from seed or large stem cuttings, but suffers from disease problems. It is widely planted as a roadside, park, and car park tree.

In agroforestry, it maintains ecosystem fertility and soil stability. It is a leguminous plant that is capable of fixing nitrogen by forming endosymbiotic relationships with nitrogen-fixing bacteria that lives in its root nodules. Nodulating leguminous plants, such as this, are able to transform atmospheric nitrogen into a plant-usable form.

In the Philippines, a permit is required to cut the Narra tree (cf. Tagalog and Cebuano Nára, Maranao Nara), but nevertheless the popular sturdy wood is widely used for construction and furniture projects.

In Singapore, the ease to propagate the tree made it a favourite for the urban planners to plant new trees via monoculture in a campaign to transform the rapidly growing city into a "green" city between 1969 and 1982. In 1985, 1,400 trees died due to "Angsana Wilt Disease", and were cut down. It was found that the fungal species Fusarium oxysporum was the cause of the disease. The fungus was carried by wood-boring ambrosia beetles boring into the trees. The infection was eventually controlled by a combination of monitoring, removal of lightning-damaged trees, and replanting with identified disease-resistant varieties.

== Symbolism ==
It is the national tree of the Philippines, as well as the provincial tree of Chonburi and Phuket Provinces in Thailand.

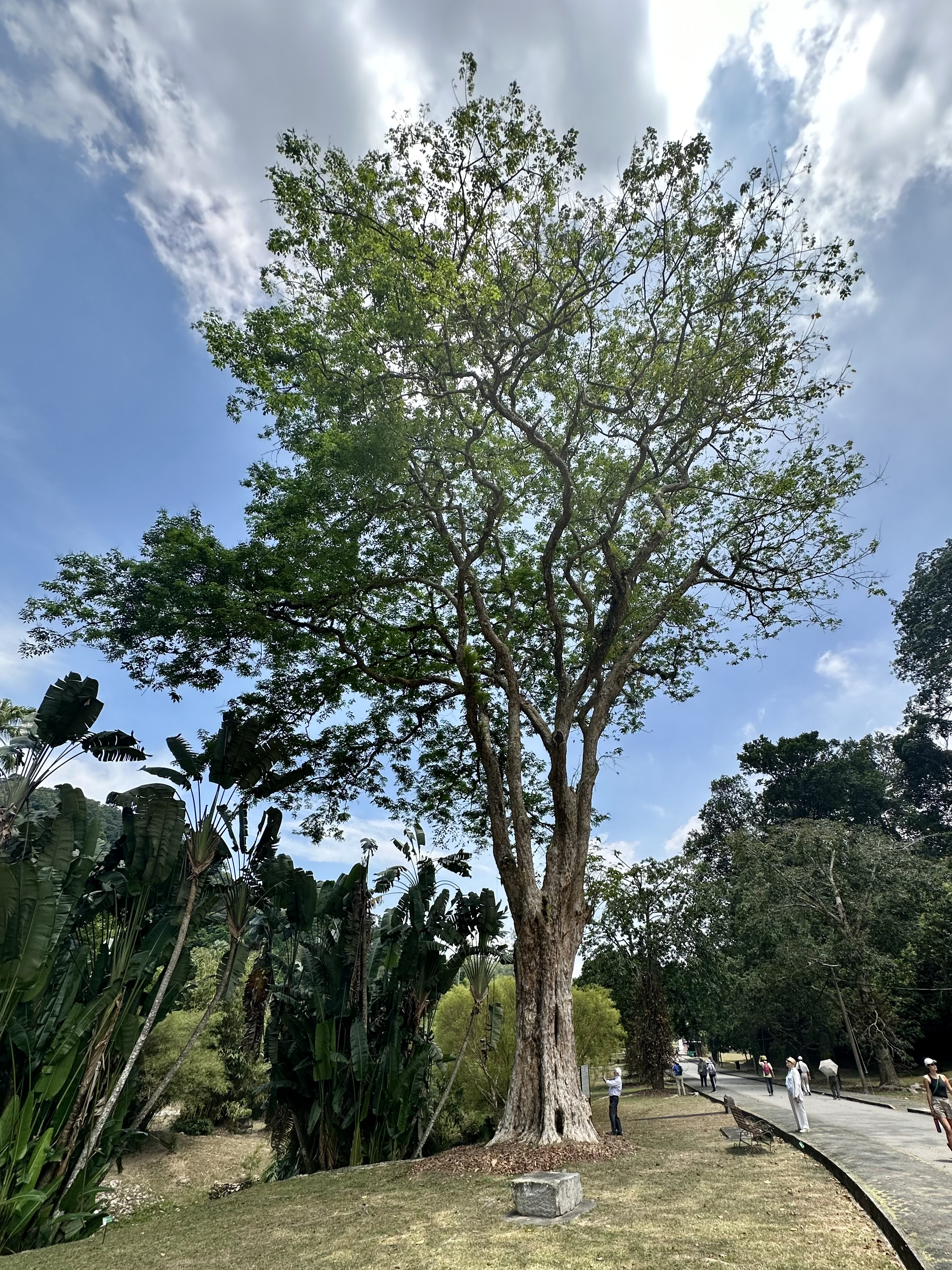
Pterocarpus indicus, Burmese rose wood tree in the Penang Botanic Garden

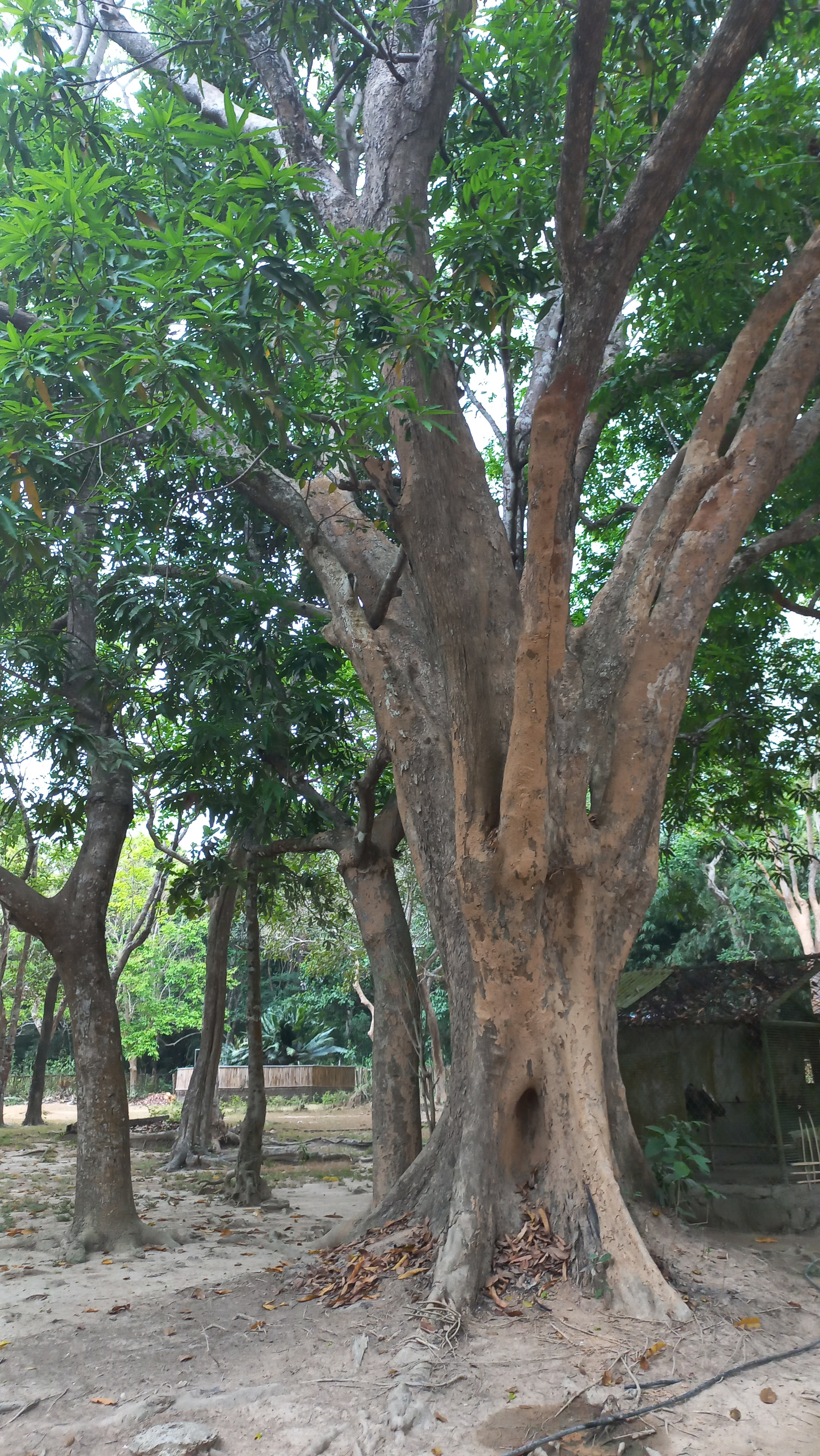
Pterocarpus indicus in Calauit Island

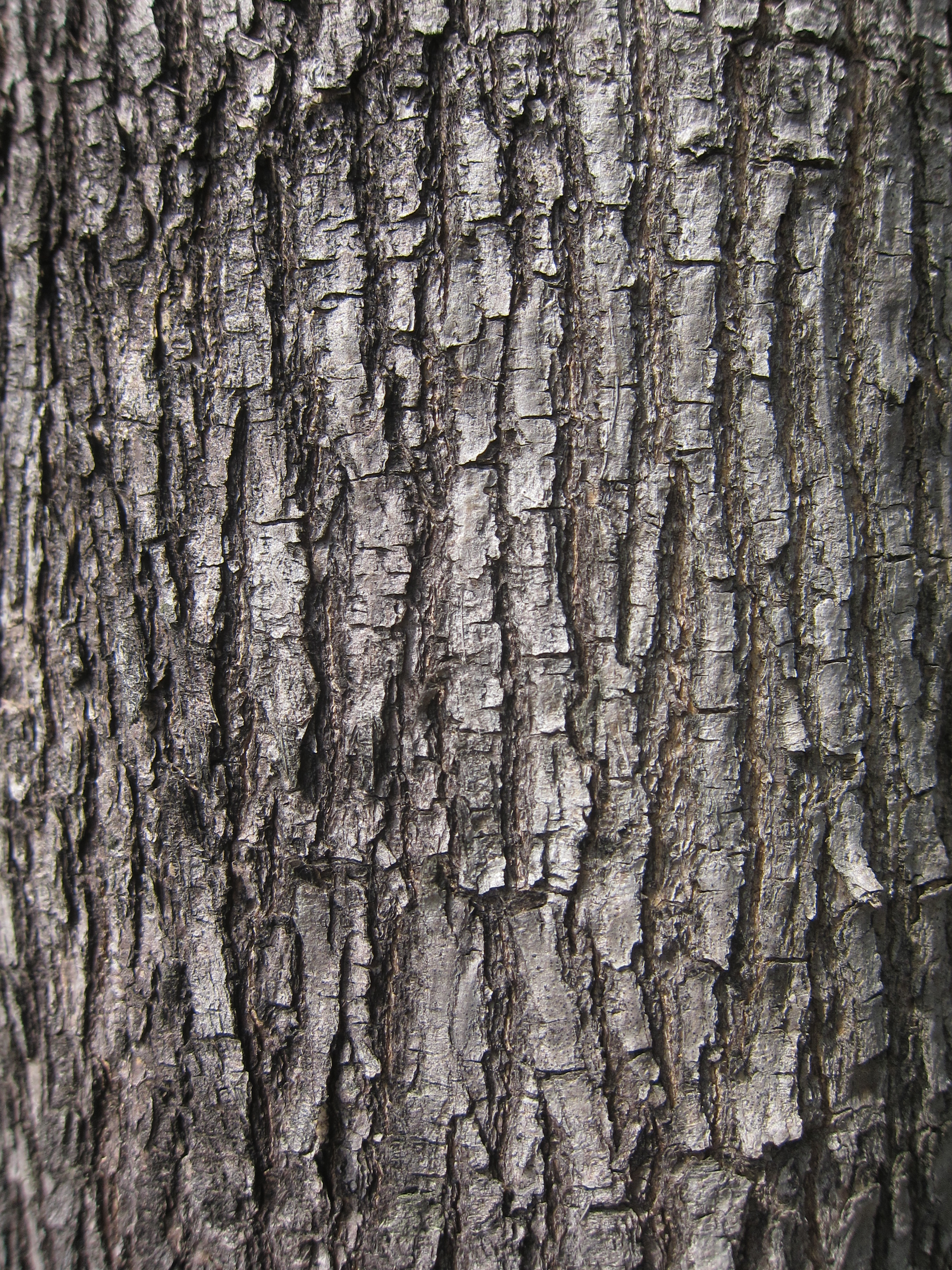
Bark of Pterocarpus indicus in Kowloon, Hong Kong
