= Lignum nephriticum =

Traditional medicinal wood

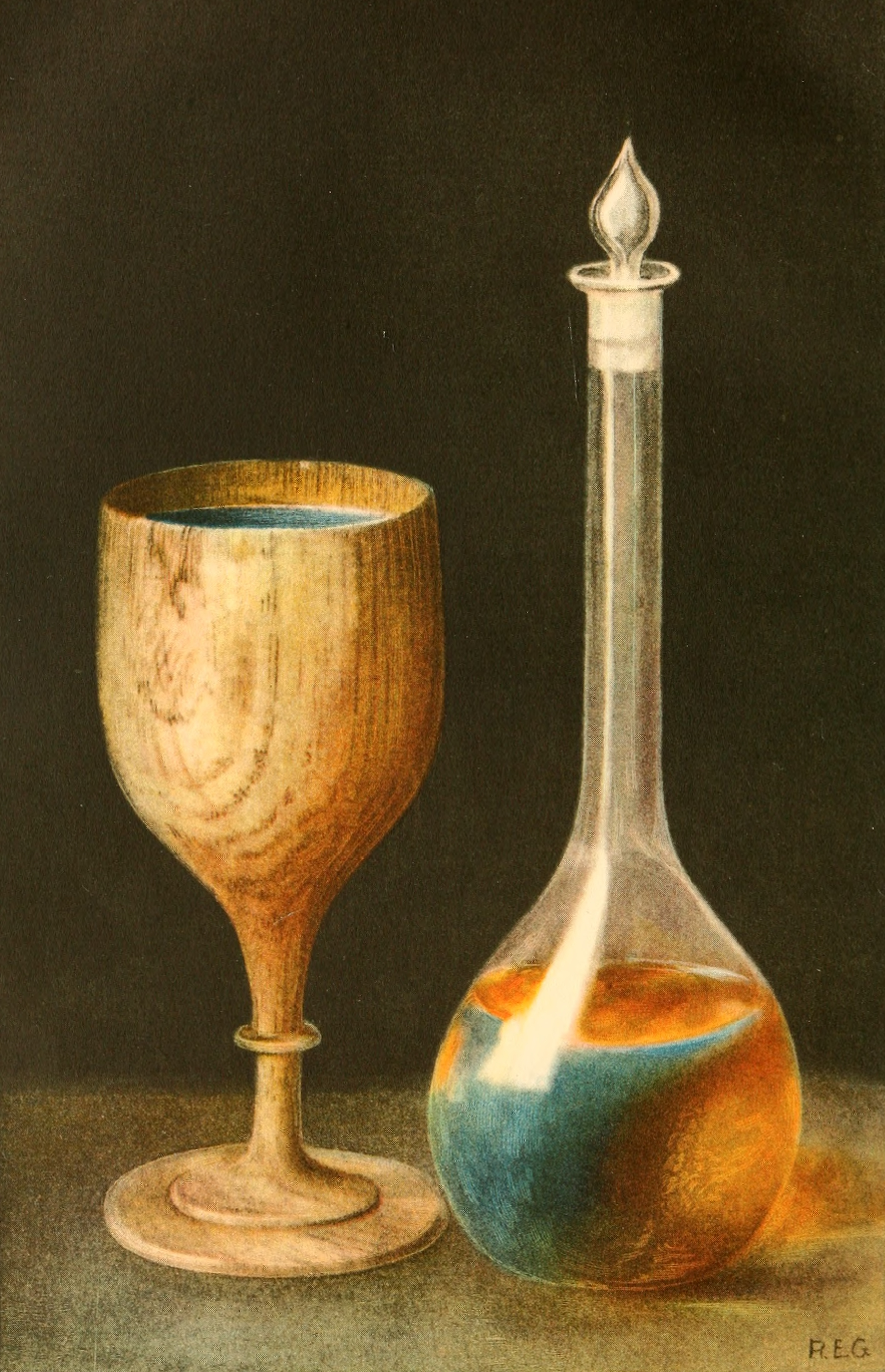
Lignum nephriticum cup made from the wood of the narra tree (Pterocarpus indicus), and a flask containing its fluorescent solution

Lignum nephriticum (Latin for "kidney wood") is a traditional diuretic that was derived from the wood of two tree species, the narra (Pterocarpus indicus) and the Mexican kidneywood (Eysenhardtia polystachya). The wood is capable of turning the color of water it comes in contact with into beautiful opalescent hues that change depending on light and angle, the earliest known record of the phenomenon of fluorescence. Due to this strange property, it became well known in Europe from the 16th to the early 18th century. Cups made from lignum nephriticum were given as gifts to royalty. Water drunk from such cups, as well as imported powders and extracts from lignum nephriticum, were thought to have great medicinal properties.

The lignum nephriticum derived from Mexican kidneywood was known as the coatli, coatl, or cuatl ("snake water") or tlapalezpatli ("blood-tincture medicine") in the Nahuatl language. It was traditionally used by the Aztec people as a diuretic prior to European contact. Similarly, the lignum nephriticum cups made from narra wood were part of the native industry of the Philippines before the arrival of the Spanish/Europeans. The cups were manufactured in southern Luzon, particularly in the area around what is now Naga City. The name of which was derived from the abundance of the narra trees, which was known as naga in the Bikol language (literally "serpent" or "dragon").

== History ==
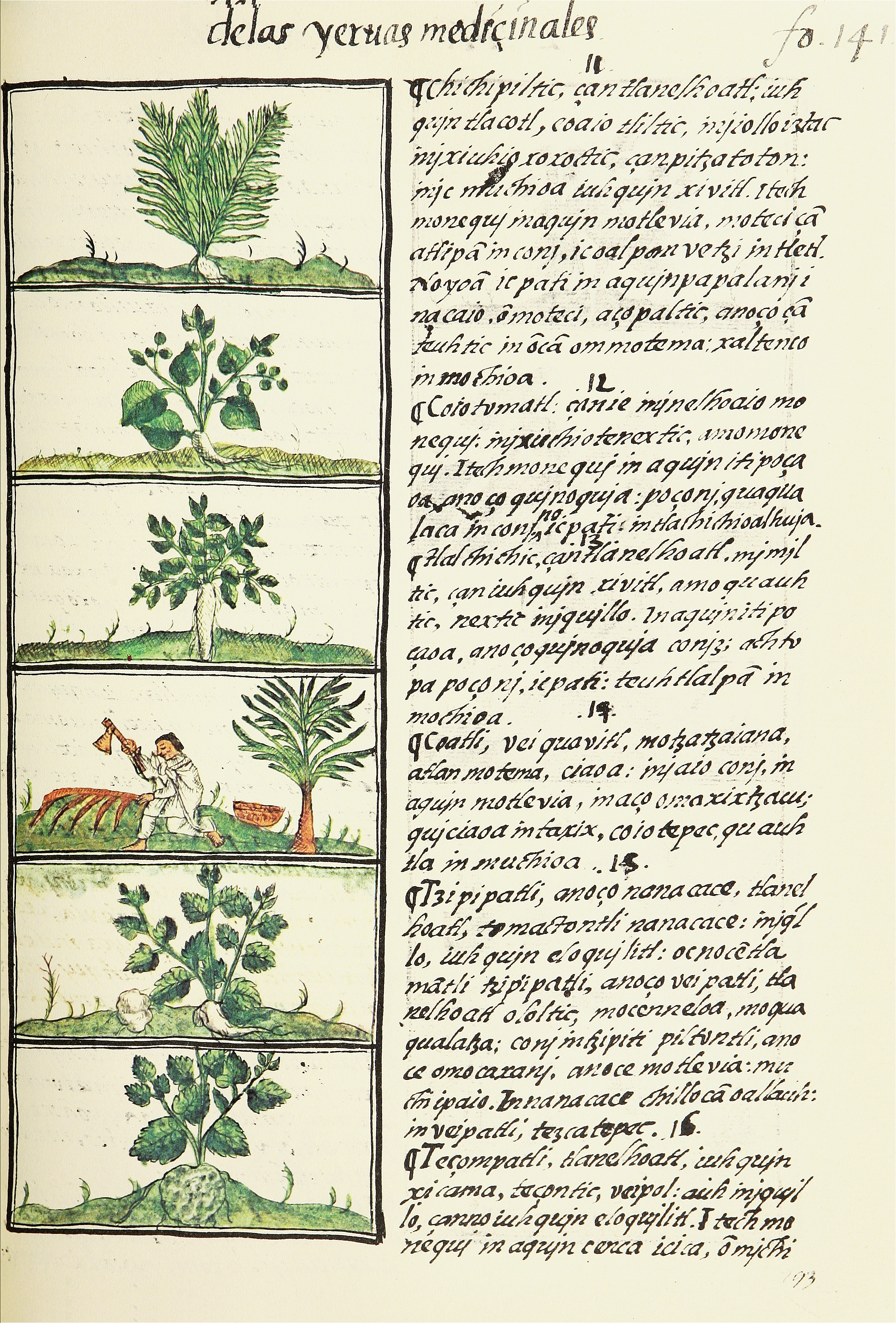
A depiction of coatli (Eysenhardtia polystachya) being harvested by an Aztec man in the Florentine codex

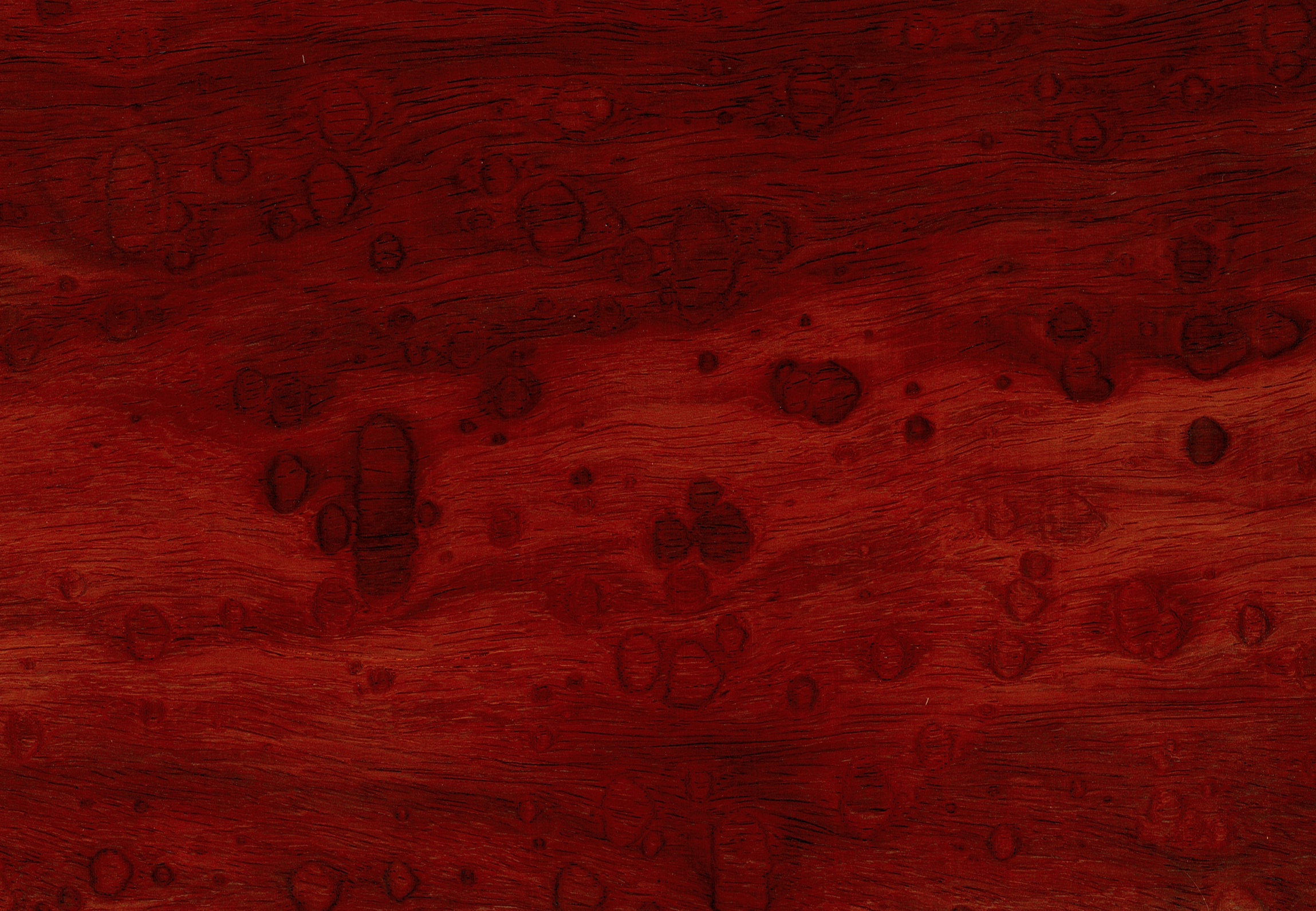
The deep red wood from the narra tree (Pterocarpus indicus), the source of lignum nephriticum cups

The first known description of the medicine appears in the Historia general de las cosas de la Nueva España (1560–1564) by the Spanish Franciscan missionary and ethnographer Bernardino de Sahagún. In the most famous surviving manuscripts of the work, the Florentine Codex, Sahagún called it by its Nahuatl name, coatli, given by Aztec healers. He described its unusual property of turning the color of water that comes in contact with it to bright blue: "...patli, yoan aqujxtiloni, matlatic iniayo axixpatli [...it is a medicine, and makes the water of blue color, its juice is medicinal for the urine]".

The Spanish physician and botanist Nicolás Monardes also independently described the medicine in his 1565 work Historia medicinal de las cosas que se traen de nuestras Indias Occidentales. He is the origin of the name lignum nephriticum, due to the use of the wood to treat liver and kidney ailments in New Spain. He described the wood as white in color. It was prepared by being sliced into very thin chips. The chips were then placed in clear spring water. After about half an hour, the water starts to turn a very pale blue, turning bluer as time passes. The water is then drunk neat or mixed with wine. He observed that despite the change in color, the wood itself imparts no taste to the water.

In 1570, Francisco Hernández de Toledo, the court physician of King Philip II of Spain, led what is considered the first scientific expedition to the Americas. When he returned to Spain in 1577, he gave testimony of the medicinal properties of lignum nephriticum, as described by Monardes. However, he expressed uncertainty as to its origin, stating that while he was told the source plant was a shrub, he had personally also witnessed specimens that reached the size of very large trees. In 1646, Athanasius Kircher, a German Jesuit scholar residing in Rome, published an account of his experiments on lignum nephriticum in his work Ars Magna Lucis et Umbræ. He conducted his experiments on a cup given to him as a gift from Jesuit missionaries in Mexico. He commented that while previous authors only described the color of the water mixed with lignum nephriticum as blue, his own experiments actually showed that the wood turned the water into all kinds of colours, depending on the light. He later presented the cup to the Holy Roman Emperor, Ferdinand III.

The wood of the tree thus described, when made into a cup, tinges water when poured into it at first a deep blue, the colour of a Bugloss flower; and the longer the water stands in it the deeper the colour it assumes. If then the water is poured into a glass globe and held against the light, no vestige of the blue colour will be seen, but it will appear to observers like pure clean spring water, limpid and clear. But if you move this glass phial toward a more shady place the liquid will assume a most delightful greenness, and if to a still more shady place, a reddish colour; and thus it will change colour in a marvelous way according to the nature of its background. In the dark, however, or in an opaque vase, it will once more assume its blue colour.

— Athanasius Kircher, Ars Magna Lucis et Umbræ (1646)

A second cup was described by in 1650 by the Swiss botanist Johann Bauhin in his great work Historia plantarum universalis. He had received it under the name palum indianum from a colleague. Unlike the wood in Monardes' account, the wood the cup was made from was reddish in color. It was a handspan in diameter, about 9 in (23 cm), and adorned with variegated lines. Shavings from the same wood were included with the cup. Bauhin observed that when water was poured into the cup with the wood shavings, the water shortly turned into "a wonderful blue and yellow color, and when held up against the light beautifully resembled the varying color of the opal, giving forth reflections, as in that gem, of fiery yellow, bright red, glowing purple, and sea green most wonderful to behold." Bauhin believed that the wood was taken from a species of ash (Fraxinus).

In 1664, Robert Boyle explained the phenomenon to be dependent on pH. In an unpublished paper in 1665, Sir Isaac Newton first mentioned the cups in the paper "Of Colours". He later also mentioned in 1672, in his theories of light and color. However, the botanical origin of wood used in lignum nephriticum was eventually lost in the late 18th century.

== Modern studies ==
In 1915, the source of the wood was rediscovered by the American botanist William Edwin Safford. He deduced that lignum nephriticum actually came from two species of trees that became confused as one. He identified the original traditional remedy described by Monardes as Mexican kidneywood, a native of Mexico, while the cups which became famous in Europe were originally carved from narra wood by the inhabitants of southern Luzon from the Philippines. It was imported into Mexico through the Manila-Acapulco Galleon trade and from there, introduced to Europe. Both species are members of the legume family Fabaceae.

It is now known that Sahagún's and Monardes' accounts are the earliest known records of the phenomenon of fluorescence. The unusual property of the wood was caused by the compound matlaline, which is the oxidation product of one of the flavonoids found in the wood. The phenomenon is also exhibited by other members of the family Fabaceae.

== See also ==
- Bologna Stone
- Silphium
- Lignum vitae
