= Manggahan Floodway =

Artificial waterway in the Philippines

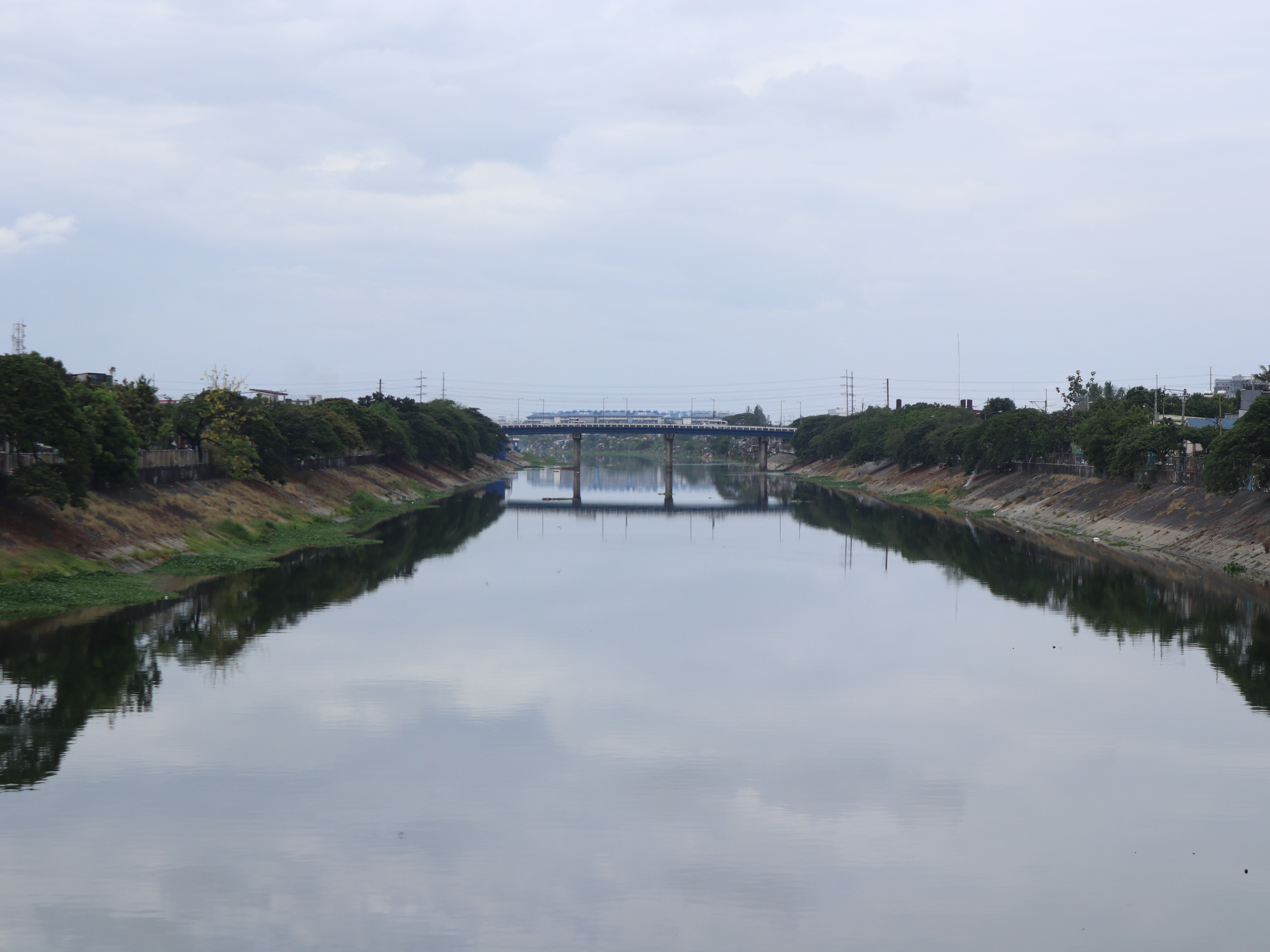
- Manggahan Floodway in Pasig (2021)

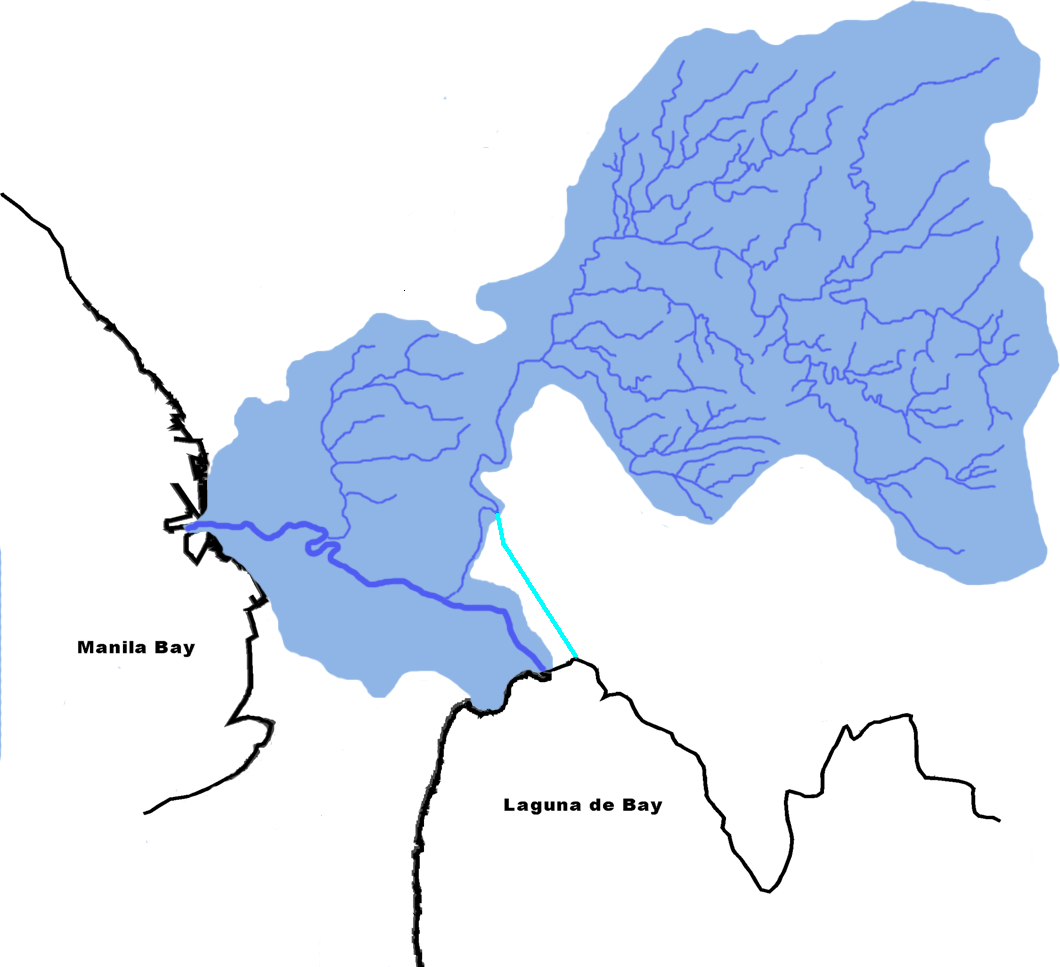
- Pasig-Marikina River basin with the Manggahan Floodway shown in cyan.

Location
- Country: Philippines
- Region: Metro Manila, Rizal

Physical characteristics
- Source: Marikina River
  - location: Pasig, Metro Manila
  - coordinates: 14°35′56″N 121°05′25″E
- Mouth: Laguna de Bay
  - location: Taytay, Rizal
  - coordinates: 14°31′30″N 121°08′10″E
- Length: 10 km (6.2 mi)

The Manggahan Floodway is an artificially constructed waterway in Metro Manila, Philippines. The floodway was built in 1986, at a cost of 1.1 billion pesos, in order to reduce flooding along the Pasig River during the rainy season, by diverting the peak water flows of the Marikina River to Laguna de Bay, which serves as a temporary reservoir. If the water level on the lake is higher than the Marikina River, the floodway's flow can be reversed.

By design, the Manggahan Floodway is capable of handling 2,400 cubic meters per second of water flow, although the actual flow is about 2,000 cubic meters per second. To complement the floodway, the Napindan Hydraulic Control System (NHCS) was built in 1983 at the confluence of the Marikina River and the Napindan Channel of the Pasig River to regulate the tidal flow of saline water between Manila Bay and the lake, and to prevent the intrusion of polluted water into the lake.

It has a fully gated diversion dam at its head and was designed with a width of 260 meters (850 ft). Over 40,000 households are situated along the floodway's banks and these shoreline slums have reduced its effective width to 220 meters (720 ft). Kangkong is cultivated extensively in the floodway as well.

The Manggahan Floodway was supposed to function together with the proposed Paranaque Spillway Project, a spillway that would direct flood waters from Laguna de Bay to Manila Bay. However the spillway project was cancelled in 1977 due to budget issues. Since the onslaught of 2009's Typhoon Ketsana (Ondoy), and consistently-reoccurring flooding in the metropolis, the Paranaque Spillway project is being revived, together with the proposed Marikina Dam.

== History ==
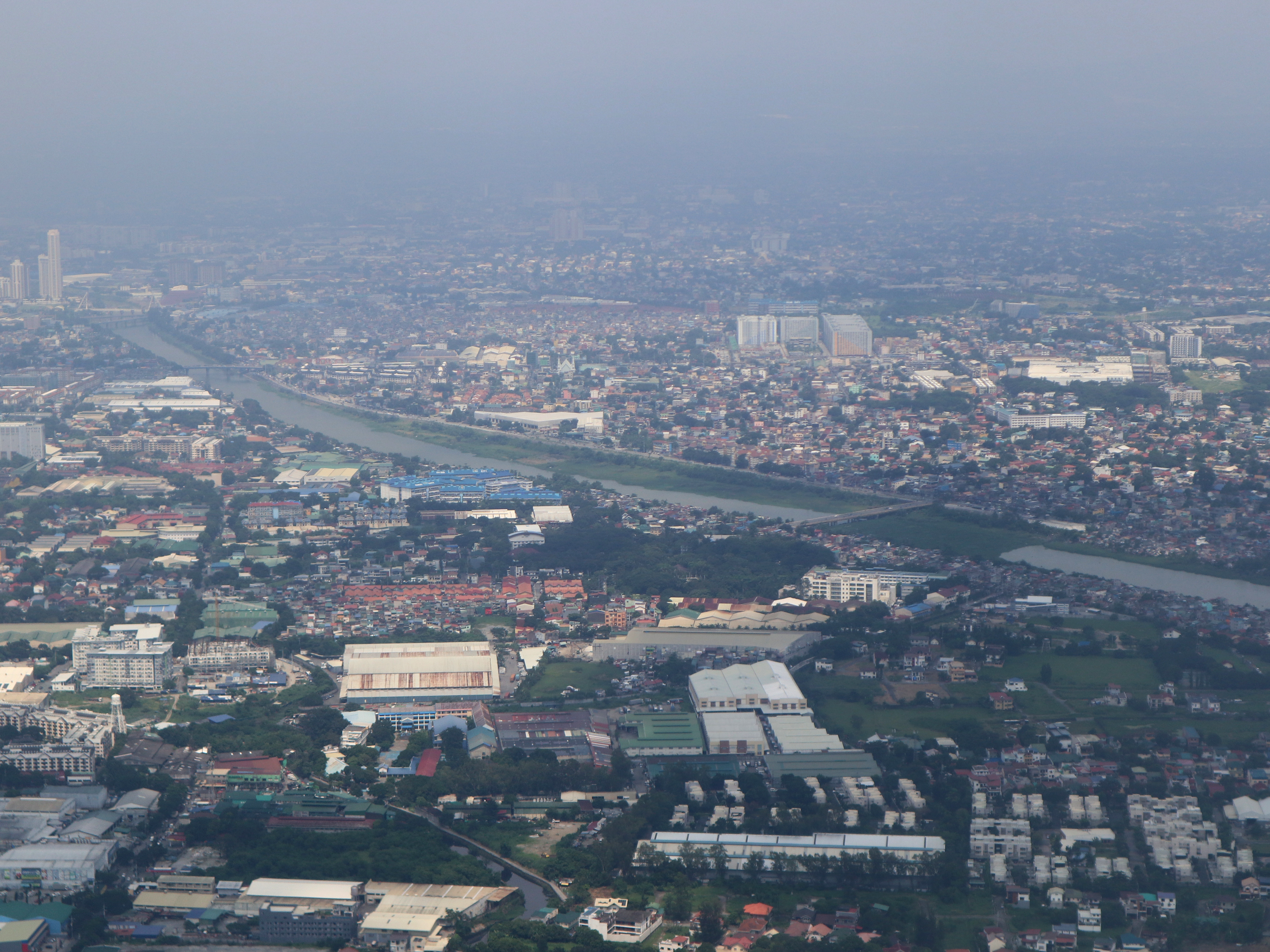
Aerial view of Manggahan Floodway in 2023

The Manggahan Floodway was conceived during the presidency of Ferdinand Marcos. In the mid-1970s, the Marcos administration had outlined three projects that aimed to divert excess water from the Laguna de Bay to Manila Bay; these were the Napindan Hydraulic Control Structure, the Manggahan Floodway, and the Parañaque spillway. The first two projects were completed in 1983 and 1986 (1988, according to JICA), respectively; however, the Parañaque spillway project was never implemented due to budget restraint despite increases in its budget allocation in 1976.

== Bridges ==
The floodway has only 4 bridges. The 3 bridges within Pasig are Manggahan Bridge (near Marikina River), Ortigas Bridge (carries Ortigas Avenue Extension) and F.B. Legaspi Bridge. Barkadahan Bridge is the last and only nearest bridge to the lakeshore of Laguna de Bay located at Taytay, Rizal.

Department of Public Works and Highways (DPWH) Secretary Mark Villar is proposing to build 2 bridges connecting the east and west bank sides along the floodway. The 2 proposed bridges are both located at the area of Pasig-Rizal Province boundary.

== Environmental concerns ==
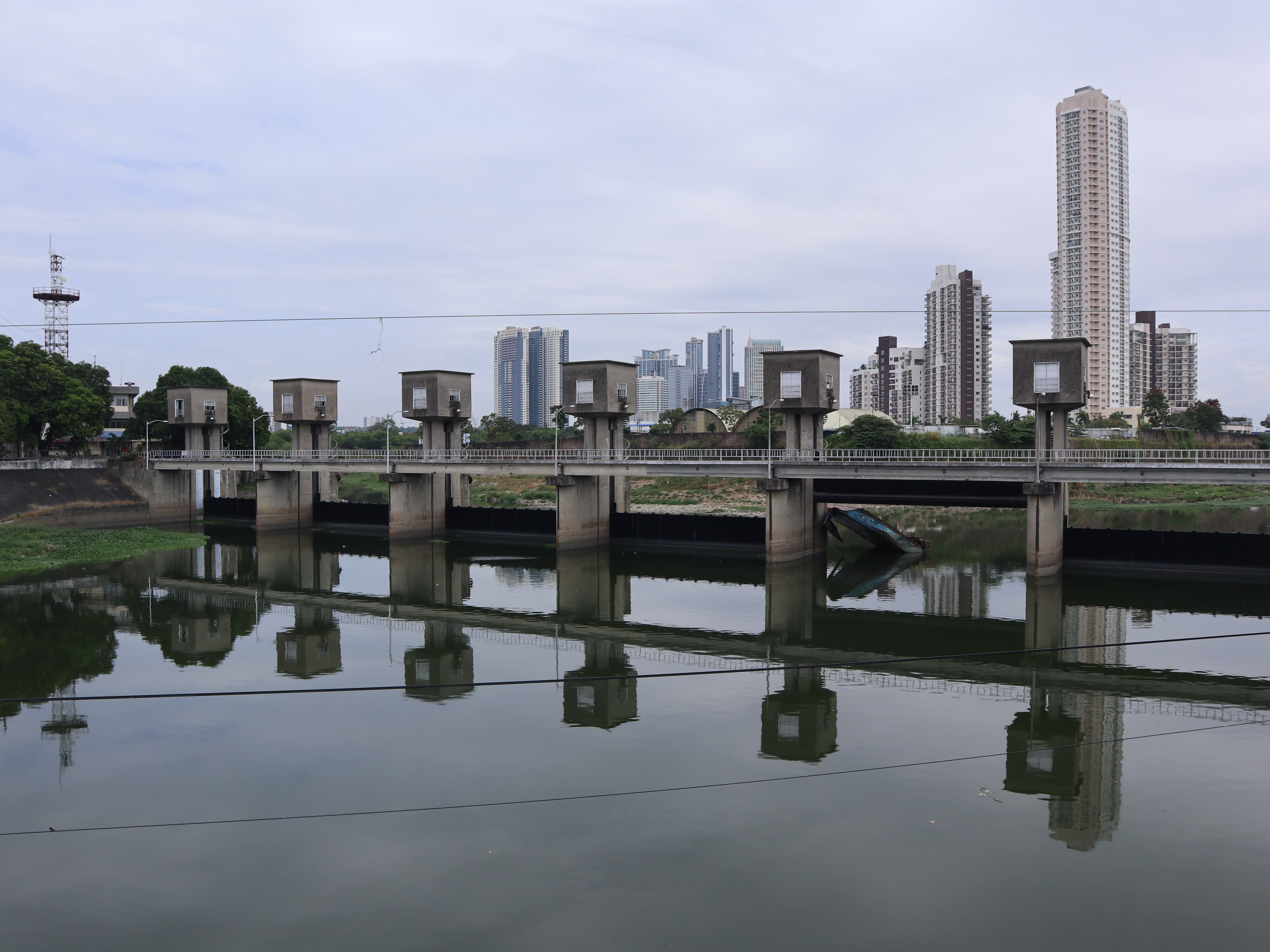
The diversion dam at the head of the floodway

By carrying flood waters to Laguna de Bay, the Manggahan Floodway lessens flood conditions in Metro Manila but contributes to flooding of the coastal areas of Taguig, Taytay, and other towns in Laguna and Rizal along the lake. Incidents of severe floods became more frequent and lasted longer in these areas since its construction. An unusual large flood occurred in October/November 1986, lasting for 2 months and resulting in high mortality and morbidity rates due to gastroenteritis and other water-borne diseases.

Furthermore, pollution and sediments carried by the floodway will jeopardize the existing and potential uses of the lake. The sedimentation rate of the lake is estimated at 1.5 million m^{3}/year with the Marikina River as a major contributor of silt to the lake through the Manggahan Floodway. Additional pollution and siltation come from the shoreline settlers, living in slums up to 5 rows deep, whose waste goes directly into the floodway.

== Tropical Storm Ketsana (Ondoy) ==
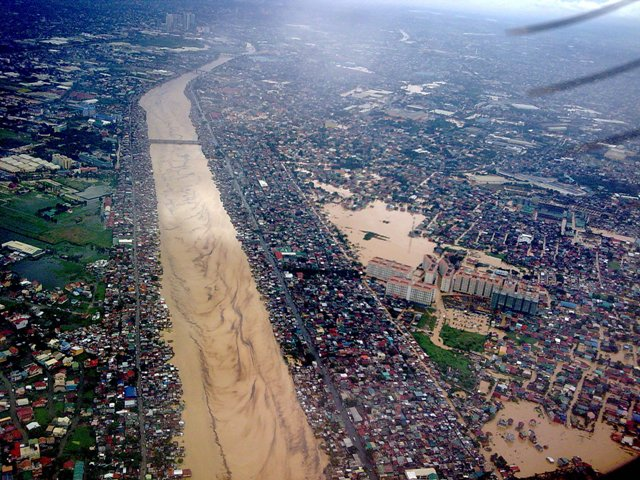
Aerial view of Manggahan floodway a day after Tropical Storm Ketsana (Ondoy) hit the National Capital Region, leaving massive flooding in its wake.

On September 26, 2009, at about 6:00 pm PST, the 50-mph "Tropical Storm Ketsana" (called "Ondoy" in the Philippines) hit Metro Manila and dumped one month's rainfall in less than 24 hours, causing the Marikina River system, including the Manggahan Floodway, to burst its banks very rapidly. It is thought that blocked pipes and a poorly maintained sewer system, along with uncollected domestic waste, were major contributory factors in the speed with which the flood waters were able to engulf the surrounding area. The illegal settlers especially were blamed for flooding since their houses reduce the effective width and blocked the flow of the floodway. The flooding was exacerbated by cancellation of the Paranaque Spillway Project that should have dumped excess water in Laguna de Bay to Manila Bay.

During the height of the storm, the Marikina River had a flow of about 3000 m^{3}/s (106,000 ft^{3}/s), and the head of the UP National Hydraulic Research Center stated that the floodway could have handled this flow without overflowing if there were no settlers on its banks.

Consequently, in February 2010, President Gloria Macapagal Arroyo revoked Proclamation 160 that reserved 20 parcels of land along the floodway for 6700 urban poor families, and ordered the forcible relocation of the illegal settlers whose houses were blocking the waterway to Laguna de Bay.
