= Eysenhardtia polystachya =

- Kidneywood

Conservation status
- Least Concern (IUCN 3.1)

- Apparently Secure (NatureServe)

Scientific classification
- Kingdom: Plantae
- Clade: Tracheophytes
- Clade: Angiosperms
- Clade: Eudicots
- Clade: Rosids
- Order: Fabales
- Family: Fabaceae
- Subfamily: Faboideae
- Genus: Eysenhardtia
- Species: E. polystachya

Binomial name
- Eysenhardtia polystachya (Ortega) Sarg.

Synonyms
- Eysenhardtia amorphoides Kunth

Species of legume

Eysenhardtia polystachya, the kidneywood, is a tree from Mexico, Arizona and New Mexico, growing along forest edges and water courses at elevations of 150–3,000 m (490–9,840 ft). Previously, it was used as a source of lignum nephriticum.
