= Calauan =

Municipality in Laguna, Philippines

- Municipality
- Municipality of Calauan
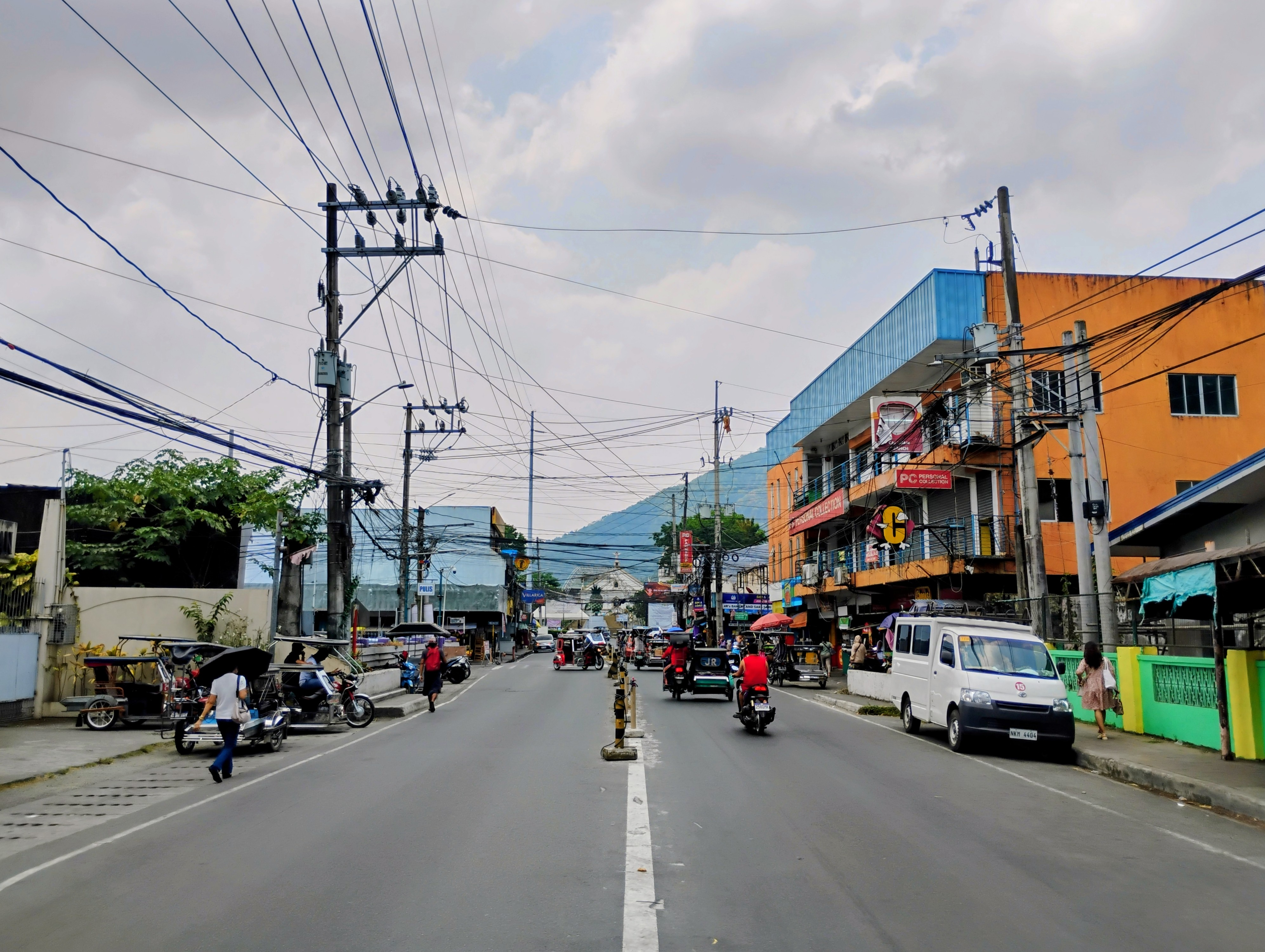
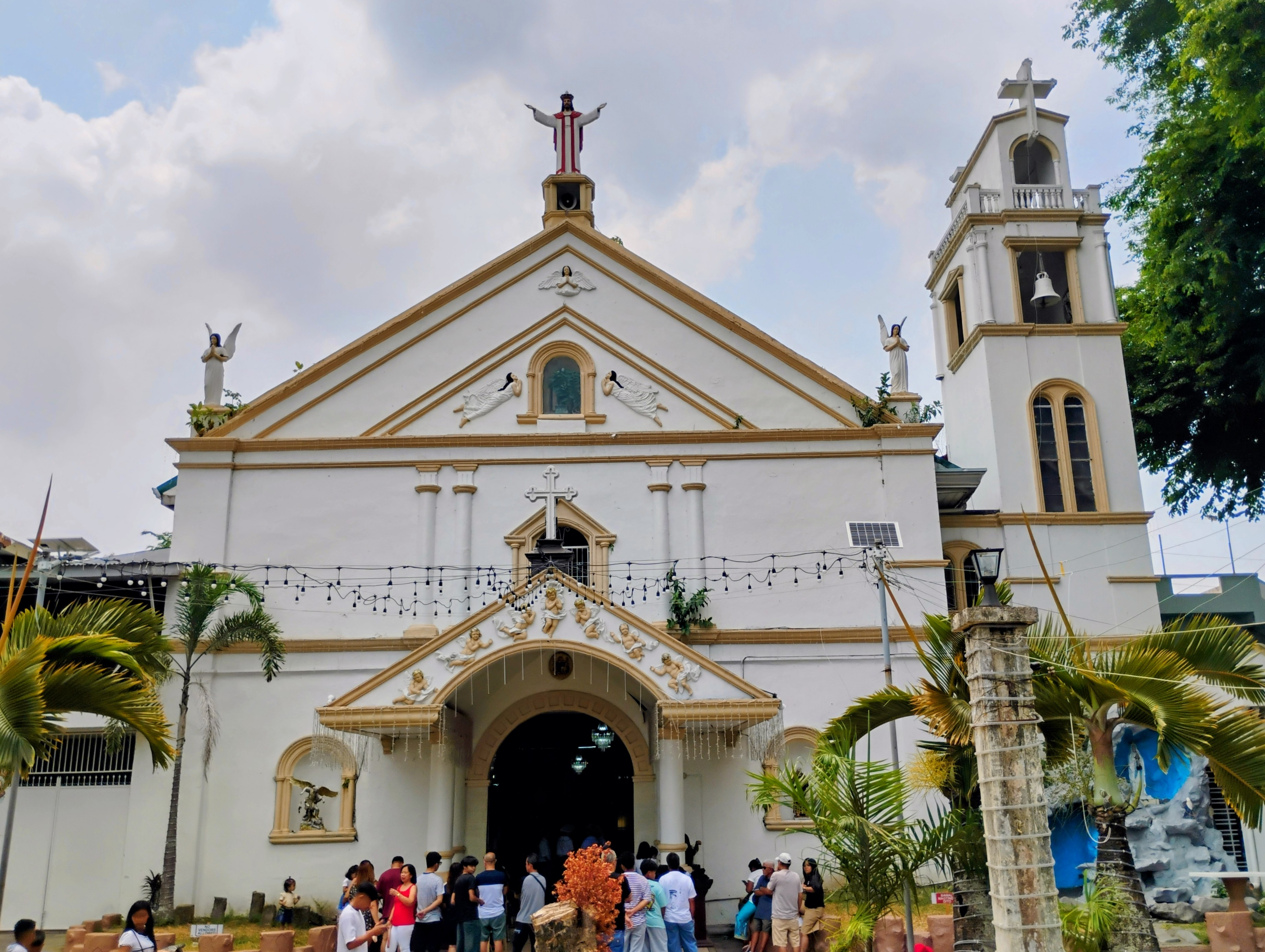
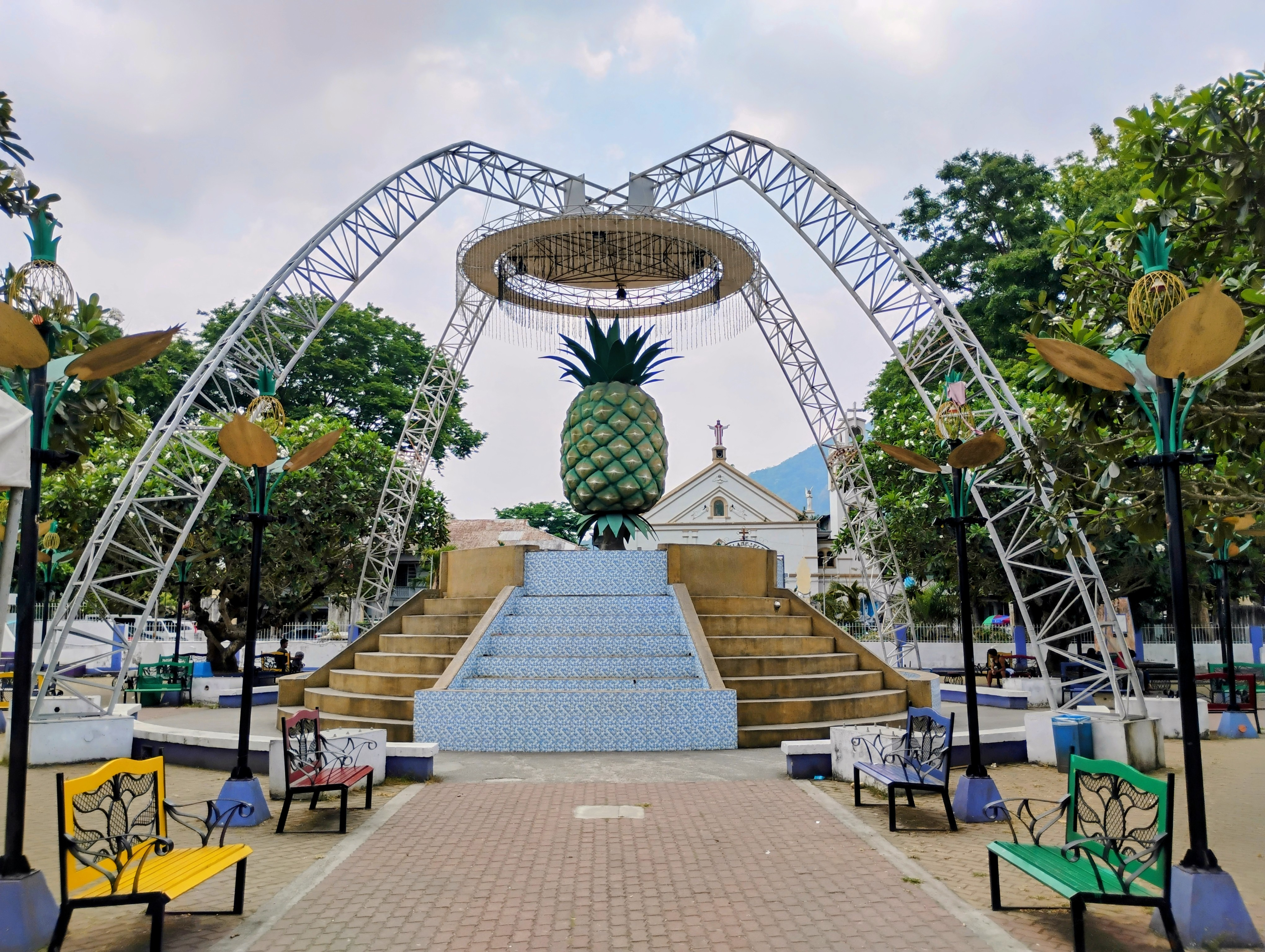
- Calauan Town Proper Saint Isidore the Laborer Parish Church Calauan Town Plaza

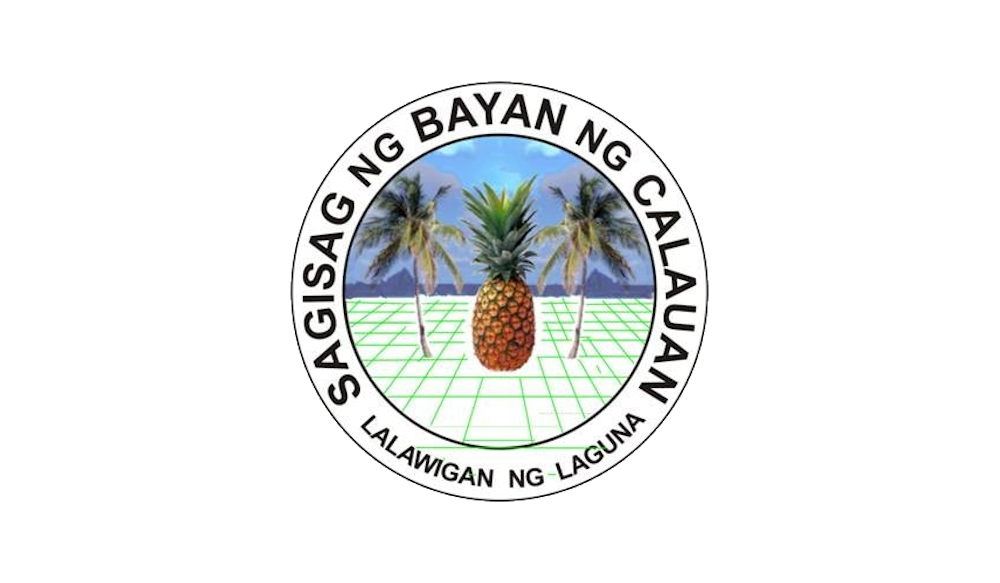
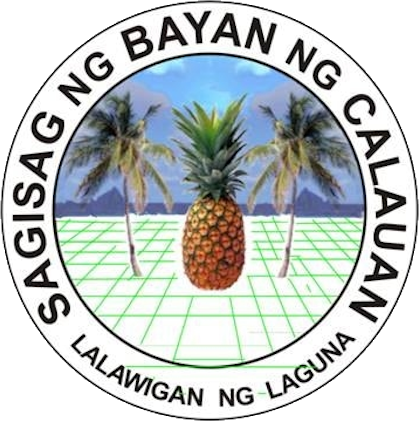
- Flag Seal
- Nickname: Home of the Sweet Laguna Pineapple
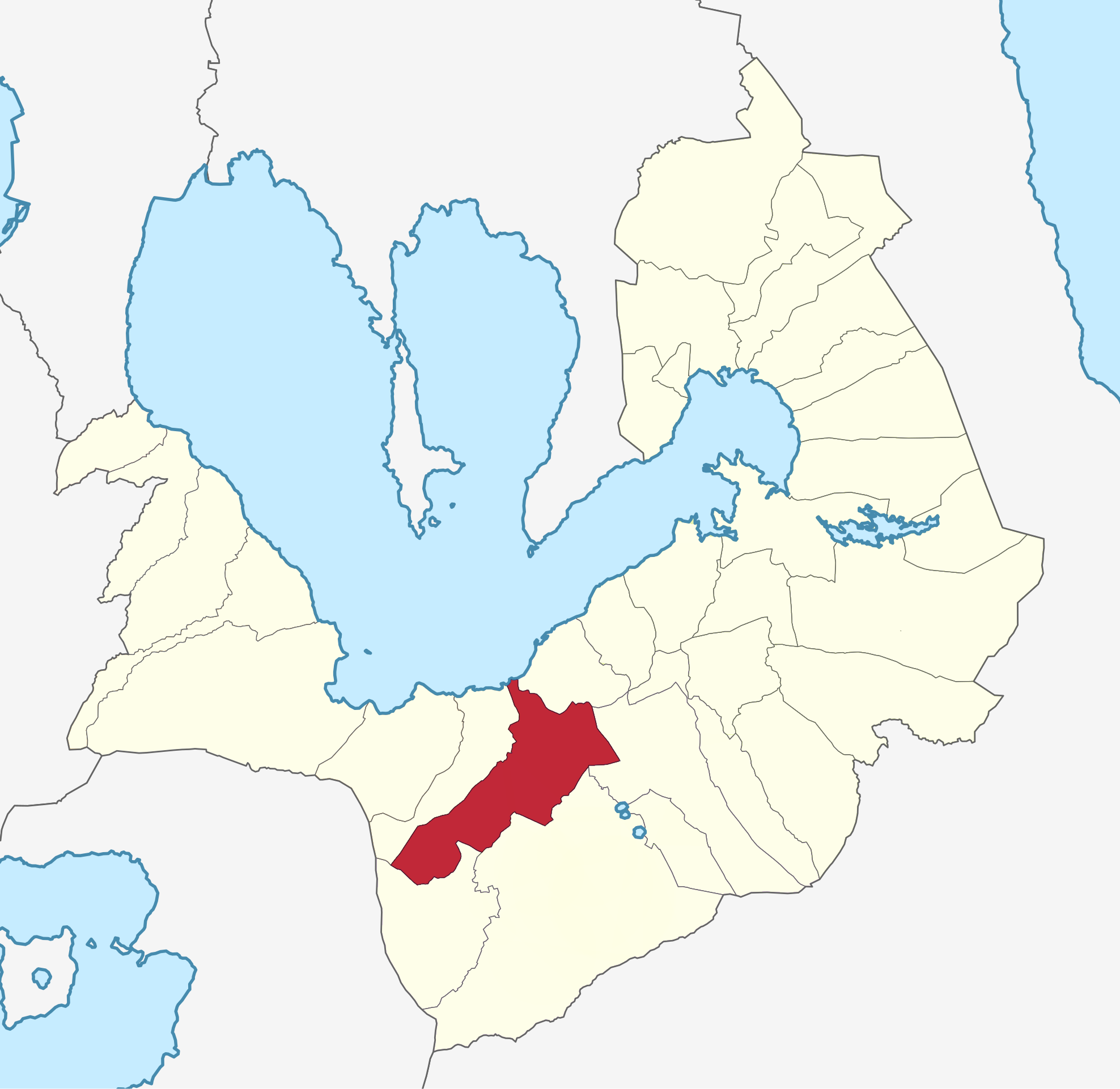
- Map of Laguna with Calauan highlighted
- Interactive map of Calauan
- Location within the Philippines
- Coordinates: 14°09′N 121°19′E
- Country: Philippines
- Region: Calabarzon
- Province: Laguna
- District: 3rd district
- Barangays: 17 (see Barangays)

Government
  - Type: Sangguniang Bayan
  - Mayor: Roseller G. Caratihan
  - Vice Mayor: Allan Jun V. Sanchez
  - Representative: Loreto Amante
  - Municipal Council: Members: Allan Antonio V. Sanchez; Joewel M. Gonzales; June Joseph F. Brion; Dante C. Escarez; Homer Jeffrille E. Hilario; Joselito M. Manalo; Kenneth B. Kraft; Mac Jefferson T. Roxas
  - Electorate: 52,024 voters (2025)

Area
  - Total: 65.40 km^{2} (25.25 sq mi)
- Elevation: 124 m (407 ft)
- Highest elevation: 1,084 m (3,556 ft)
- Lowest elevation: 2 m (6.6 ft)

Population (2024 census)
  - Total: 89,670
  - Density: 1,371/km^{2} (3,551/sq mi)
  - Households: 21,374
- Demonym: Calaueño

Economy
  - Income class: 1st municipal income class
  - Poverty incidence: 13.54% (2023)
  - Revenue: ₱ 353.6 million (2024)
  - Assets: ₱ 944.2 million (2024)
  - Expenditure: ₱ 246.2 million (2024)
  - Liabilities: ₱ 152.3 million (2024)

Service provider
  - Electricity: Manila Electric Company (Meralco)
- Time zone: UTC+8 (PST)
- ZIP code: 4012
- PSGC: 0403406000
- IDD : area code: +63 (0)49
- Native languages: Tagalog
- Patron saint: Isidore the Laborer
- Website: www.calauanlaguna.gov.ph

Calauan (IPA: [kɐˈlaː.wɐn]), officially the Municipality of Calauan (Tagalog: Bayan ng Calauan), is a municipality in the province of Laguna, Philippines. The municipality has a land area of 65.40 square kilometers (25.25 mi^{2}), which constitutes 2.4% of Laguna's total area. According to the 2024 census, it has a population of 89,670 people.

Calauan is known for its pineapple production, which is part of its local economy. The town is known for the Pineapple Festival, which is celebrated in May. It also offers serene destinations like the Field of Faith in Barangay Lamot 2 and the Isdaan Floating Restaurant located along the Calamba–Pagsanjan Road.

== Etymology ==
Calauan, was spelled Calauang in the Spanish colonial period of the Philippines. It is derived from the Tagalog term kalawang, which means "rust".

== History ==
The fertile soil of Calauan attracted the attention of Captain Juan de Salcedo when he passed through Laguna and Tayabas (now Quezon) on his way to Bicol in 1572. Ten years later, Spanish authorities established a town government two kilometers (1.2 mi) from the site of the present Poblacion, in what is now Barrio Mabacan. They called the townsite "Calauan" (Tagalog for rust). Following an epidemic in 1703, the town was moved to its present site at the fork of three roads, one southwestward leading to San Pablo, the other southeastward to Santa Cruz, the provincial capital, and the third going north to Manila.

At the turn of the 18th century, when Bay was designated as the provincial capital of Laguna, Calauan functioned as a sitio under its jurisdiction. As a result, merchants traveling to and from Southern Luzon commonly passed through both Bay and Calauan, contributing to the area’s early economic activity and connectivity within the region. In 1812, a wealthy Spaniard named Iñigo acquired extensive tracts of land in Calauan. These holdings, later expanded and maintained by his heirs, remained largely undeveloped for a considerable period due to their vast size. The estate came to be known as Hacienda Calauan, a name that persists in historical references to the area. According to the 1818 Spanish census, the settlement had a population consisting of 610 native families and 2 Spanish-Filipino families, reflecting its early demographic composition during the colonial period.

During the Philippine Revolution, Basilio Geiroza (better known as Cabesang Basilio) and his men routed a battalion of "guardia civiles" in a five-hour battle in Barrio Cupangan (now Lamot I) in December 1897. During the subsequent Philippine-American hostilities, Calauan patriots fought numerically superior forces of General Elwell Otis in Barrio San Diego of San Pablo. With the establishment of civilian authority in Calauan in 1902, the Americans assigned Mariano Marfori as the first "presidente". Hacienda Calauan financed the construction of a hospital in 1926, and Mariano O. Marfori Jr., son of the first municipal presidente, became the hospital director and the resident physician, respectively.

In 1939, at the request of President Manuel L. Quezon, Doña Margarita Roxas viuda de Soriano, granddaughter of the Spaniard Iñigo, subdivided Hacienda Calauan and sold it to the tenants; part of what remained was converted into a rest house and a swimming pool, and it became one of the tourist attractions until 1956.

In 1993, the town became the focus of media attention when Antonio Sanchez, who was serving as mayor at the time, got involved in a rape and double murder case involving two University of the Philippines Los Baños students. Sanchez and several other men were given a life sentence in March 1995.

== Geography ==
Calauan is 73 kilometers (45 mi) southeast of Manila, via Calamba and Los Baños, and 26 kilometers (16 mi) from Santa Cruz.

=== Geographical landmarks ===
Barangay Lamot 2 is the site of Mount Kalisungan, known for being where retreating Japanese soldiers made their last stand in Laguna at the end of World War II. The 760 MASL mountain is sometimes also known as Mount Nagcarlan or Mount Lamot and is a traditional Holy Week hiking site among locals. It is considered a hiker's favorite because it offers a clear view of Metro Manila, Talim Island, Mount Tagapo, the Jalajala peninsula and Mount Sembrano to the north, the Caliraya highlands to the east, the seven lakes of San Pablo, Mount San Cristobal and Mount Banahaw to the south, and Mount Makiling to the west.

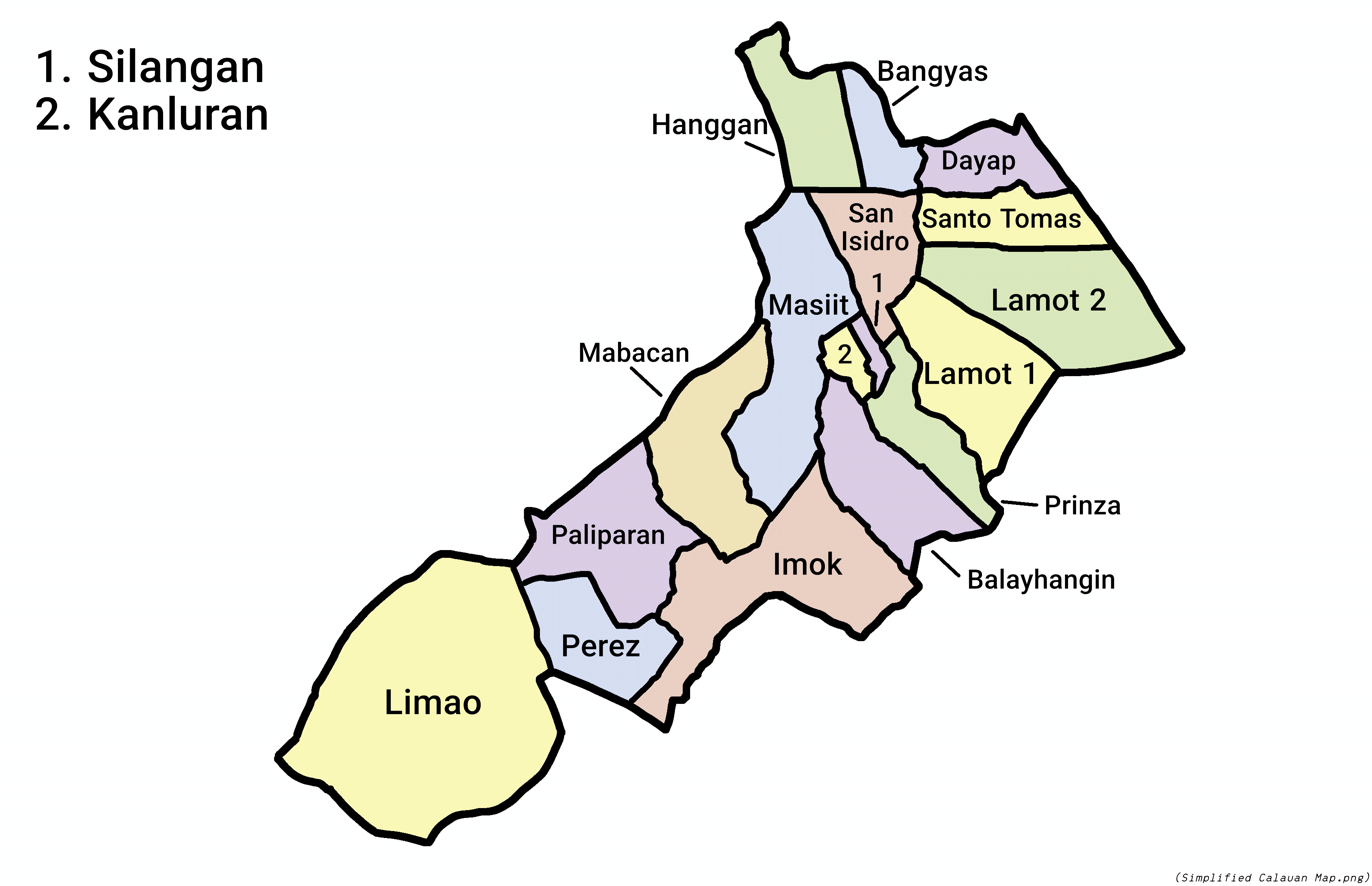
Barangay map of Calauan

=== Barangays ===
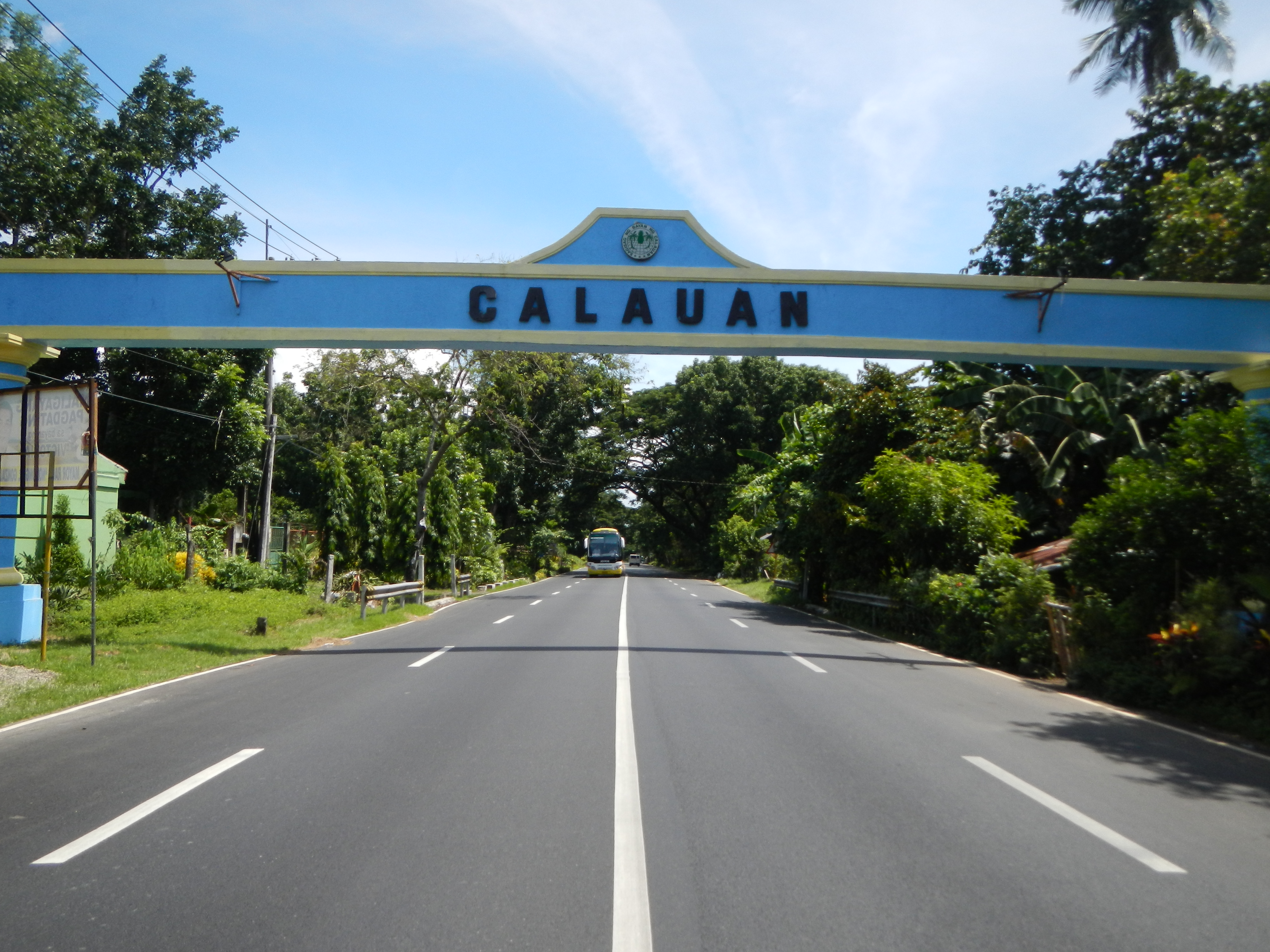
Welcome Arch

Calauan is politically subdivided into 17 barangays, as indicated below. Each barangay consists of puroks and some have sitios.

- Balayhangin
- Bangyas
- Dayap
- Hanggan
- Imok
- Lamot 1
- Lamot 2
- Limao
- Mabacan
- Masiit
- Paliparan
- Pérez
- Kanluran (Poblacion)
- Silangan (Poblacion)
- Prinza
- San Isidro
- Santo Tomas

=== Climate ===
Climate data for Calauan, Laguna
Month	Jan	Feb	Mar	Apr	May	Jun	Jul	Aug	Sep	Oct	Nov	Dec	Year
Mean daily maximum °C (°F)	27 (81)	28 (82)	30 (86)	32 (90)	31 (88)	30 (86)	29 (84)	29 (84)	29 (84)	29 (84)	28 (82)	27 (81)	29 (84)
Mean daily minimum °C (°F)	21 (70)	20 (68)	21 (70)	22 (72)	24 (75)	24 (75)	24 (75)	24 (75)	24 (75)	23 (73)	22 (72)	22 (72)	23 (73)
Average precipitation mm (inches)	52 (2.0)	35 (1.4)	27 (1.1)	27 (1.1)	82 (3.2)	124 (4.9)	163 (6.4)	144 (5.7)	145 (5.7)	141 (5.6)	100 (3.9)	102 (4.0)	1,142 (45)
Average rainy days	12.0	8.1	8.8	9.7	17.9	22.6	26.2	24.5	24.6	22.0	16.7	14.9	208
Source: Meteoblue (Use with caution: this is modeled/calculated data, not measured locally.)

== Demographics ==
Population census of Calauan
Year	Pop.	±% p.a.
1903	2,624	—
1918	2,832	+0.51%
1939	7,302	+4.61%
1948	9,180	+2.58%
1960	13,168	+3.05%
1970	19,747	+4.13%
1975	23,370	+3.44%
1980	25,259	+1.57%
1990	32,736	+2.63%
1995	36,677	+2.15%
2000	43,284	+3.61%
2007	54,248	+3.16%
2010	74,890	+12.45%
2015	80,453	+1.37%
2020	87,693	+1.83%
2024	89,670	+0.54%
Source: Philippine Statistics Authority

In the 2024 census, the population of Calauan, Laguna, was 89,670 people, with a density of 1,400 inhabitants per square kilometer or 3,600 inhabitants per square mile.

Calauan's population is expected to rise, as informal settlers in Metro Manila are being resettled in the town through the Bayan ni Juan and the Kapit-Bisig para sa Ilog Pasig project of the ABS-CBN Foundation.

=== Religion ===
The patron saint of Calauan is Isidore the Laborer, the patron of farmers, known in Spanish as San Isidro Labrador.

== Economy ==
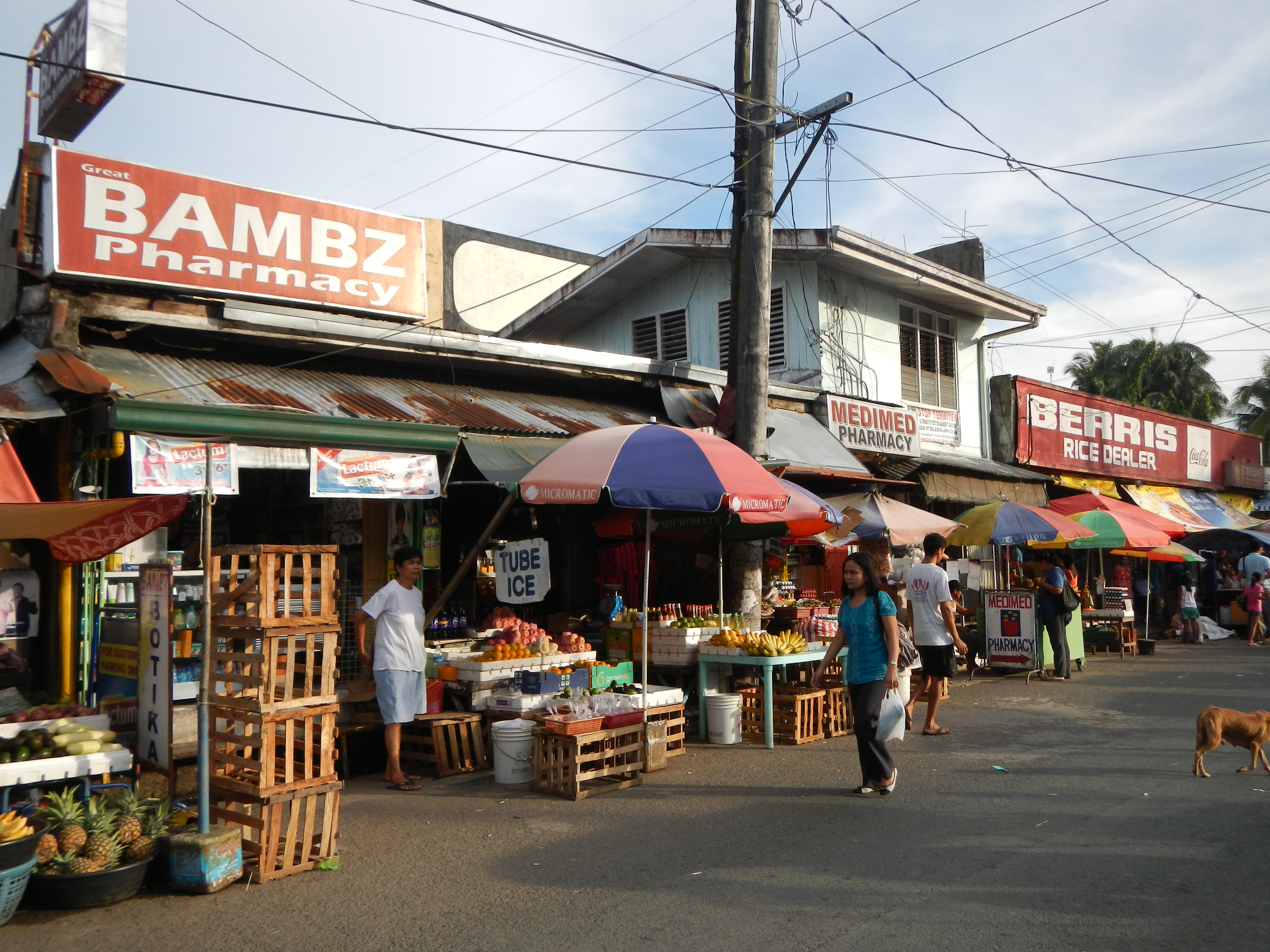
Commercial area in Calauan

Poverty incidence of Calauan (%)

Source: Philippine Statistics Authority

== Government ==
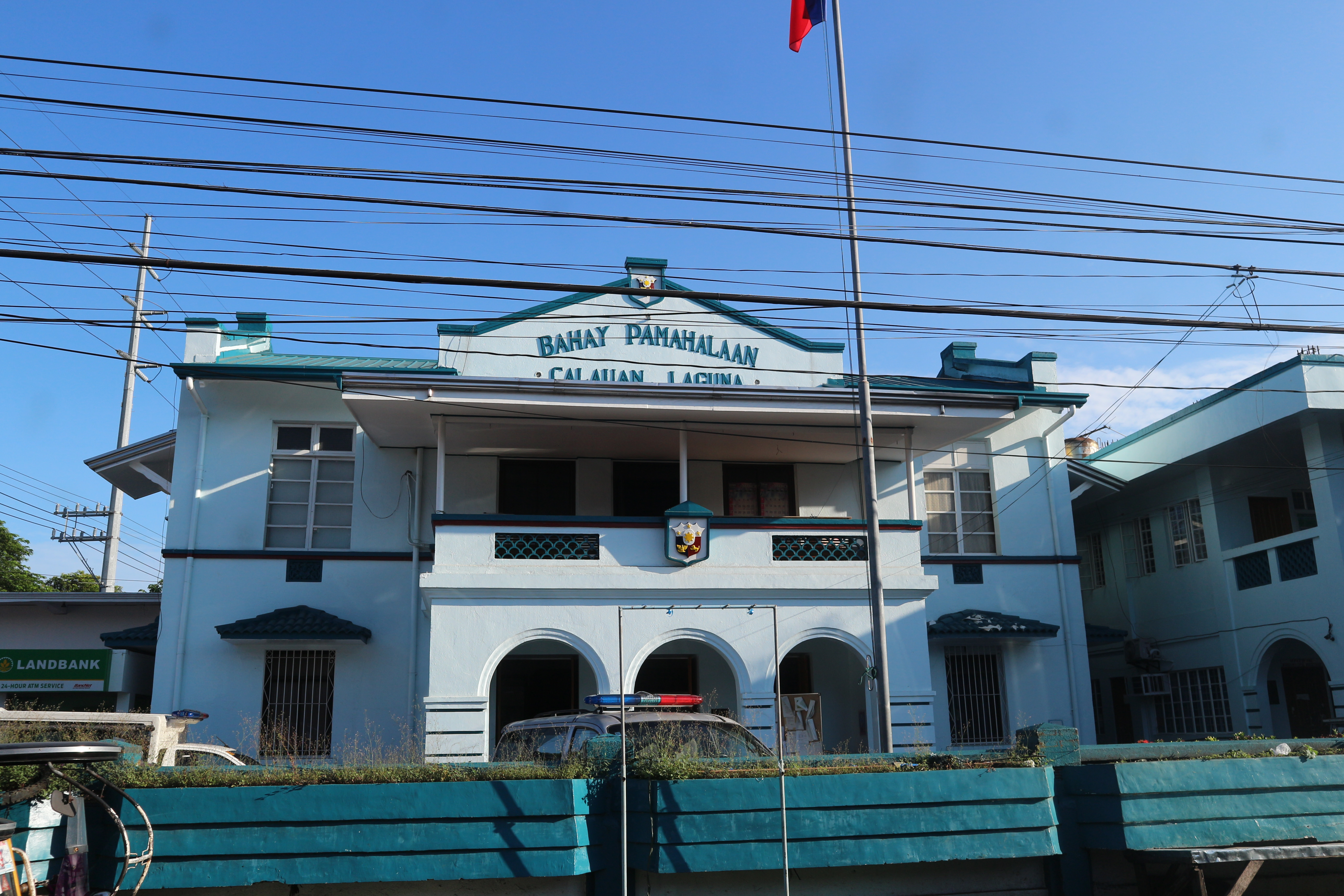
Calauan Municipal Hall

Calauan municipal officials (2022–2025)
Name	Party
Mayor
Roseller G. Caratihan	Lakas
Vice Mayor
Allan Jun V. Sanchez	Lakas
Municipal Councilors
Ave Marie Tonee S. Alcid	Independent
Aldrin P. Alimbuyog	PDP–Laban
June Joseph F. Brion	Independent
Mark Austine C. Camargo	Independent
Charles Owen M. Caratihan	PDP–Laban
Joewel M. Gonzales	Nacionalista
Joselito M. Manalo	Lakas
Allan Sanchez	Lakas

== Education ==
The Calauan Schools District Office governs all educational institutions within the municipality. It oversees the management and operations of all private and public schools from the primary to the secondary levels.

=== Primary and elementary schools ===
- Antonio Chipeco Memorial School
- Balayhangin Elementary School
- Bangyas Elementary School
- Calauan Central Elementary School
- Dayap Elementary School
- Dayap Elementary School (Annex)
- Grace Christian Community School
- Imok Elementary School
- Lamot Elementary School
- Lamot Elementary School (Annex)
- Limao Elementary School
- Mabacan Elementary School
- Madre Giovanna Zippo Learning Center
- Mahabang Parang Elementary School
- Makativille Elementary School
- Maranatha Christian Academy
- Masiit Elementary School
- Paliparan Elementary School
- Perez Elementary School
- Prinza Elementary School
- Proverbsville Baptist Academy
- San Isidro Elementary School
- Santo Tomas Elementary School
- Santo Tomas Elementary School (Annex)
- T.C. Dator Memorial Elementary School (Pulong Dayap Elementary School)
- Tamlong Elementary School
- The Refiner's Christian School

=== Secondary schools ===
- Dayap National High School
- Dayap National High School (Mabacan Annex)
- Dayap National Integrated High School
- Liceo de Calauan
- Sto. Tomas Integrated High School

=== Higher educational institution ===
- Luzonian Center of Excellence for Science and Technology
- Polytechnic University of the Philippines Calauan Campus
- Calauan Community College (CCC)
