= 2023 Binangonan boat capsizing =

Maritime incident in the Philippines

- A man stands on the capsized passenger boat during rescue operations in Binangonan
- Date: 27 July 2023
- Time: Around 1:00 p.m. (PST)
- Location: Laguna de Bay near Barangay Kalinawan, Binangonan, Rizal, Philippines; 14.4287896°N 121.1996923°E
- Cause: Strong winds and overloading
- Deaths: 27
- Injuries: At least 2

On 27 July 2023, a passenger boat capsized in Laguna de Bay near Binangonan, Rizal, Philippines, while traveling to Talim Island, killing 27 people and leaving 43 survivors. According to Philippine Coast Guard (PCG), it happened due to strong winds, which made the passengers shift to one side of the boat. The boat, identified as M/B Aya Express, capsized at around 1:00 p.m. Philippine Standard Time about 45 m (148 ft) from the shore near Barangay Kalinawan.

The boat had an authorized capacity of 42 passengers but was carrying substantially more people than the number listed on its passenger manifest. The PCG said that the manifest declared 22 passengers, while its investigation found that 66 people were aboard the boat at the time of the incident. The incident prompted investigations by the PCG and Maritime Industry Authority (MARINA), while senators called for an inquiry into the circumstances surrounding the capsizing.

Following the incident, the PCG assumed control of Pritil Port in Binangonan and implemented stricter safety protocols, which include closer examination of passenger lists and setting limits for passenger capacity at the same time.

== Background ==
Binangonan is a coastal municipality in Rizal located along Laguna de Bay. Motorized passenger boats routinely transport passengers between communities around the lake. Travel from Binangonan to the barangays of Talim Island under its jurisdiction takes between 30 minutes and two-and-a-half hours by motorized banca, depending on the destination. The capsizing was not the first fatal boat accident in Binangonan. On 30 October 2017, eight people died after a boat capsized while passengers were taking selfies at a fishery in the municipality.

On 20 July 2023, Typhoon Doksuri, known locally as Egay, affected the Philippines and enhanced the southwest monsoon, bringing strong winds and heavy rain to parts of the country. On 27 July, the Philippine Coast Guard reported that strong winds contributed to the capsizing of the M/B Aya Express in Laguna de Bay near Binangonan.

== Incident ==
On the afternoon of 27 July 2023, the M/B Aya Express, a wooden-hulled motorized passenger banca, was scheduled to leave Binangonan for its regular route to Talim Island. At around 1:00 p.m. Philippine Standard Time, the boat capsized near Barangay Kalinawan, approximately 45 m (148 ft) from the shore, and several hours after Typhoon Doksuri moved away from the Philippines. The PCG initially reported that strong winds caused passengers to panic and move toward one side of the boat, which caused the boat to overturn.

The boat was carrying more passengers than its authorized capacity. The PCG reported that the vessel had a maximum capacity of 42 passengers and that only 22 passengers were listed on the manifest, but 66 people were actually aboard when it capsized. The boat's captain admitted that additional passengers had been allowed to board after the manifest had been submitted. According to an Associated Press report, two PCG inspectors had allowed the boat to sail after being shown a manifest listing 22 passengers in addition to the three-member crew. The two inspectors were subsequently removed from their posts and placed under investigation.

A later account of the incident differed from the PCG's initial explanation. During a Senate hearing, survivor John Marley Delos Reyes said that passengers did not panic and that a broken outrigger caused the vessel to roll over. He said the boat encountered heavy rain and strong winds before its outrigger broke. Delos Reyes also said that the boat had life vests, but passengers were not instructed to wear them. He recalled that the captain had returned toward shore to pick up eight additional passengers who had missed the trip. A motorcycle, rice, groceries and textiles were among the goods loaded onto the boat. According to Delos Reyes' testimony, the passengers pulled down the tarpaulin that covered the sides and back of the boat to protect themselves from the heavy rains and strong winds. The tarpaulin prevented the passengers from getting out of the boat once it capsized, trapping some of them inside. Delos Reyes testified that he was able to find a small gap in the tarpaulin and get out of the water after that.

== Response ==
Fishermen from Barangay Kalinawan were among the first responders after the boat capsized near the barangay's shore. The PCG, police and Philippine Red Cross conducted joint underwater search and rescue/retrieval operations in the lake. The PCG resumed its search and retrieval operations the following day.

Early casualty figures varied as authorities continued to account for the passengers. Initial reports recorded 23 deaths and 40 survivors, while later figures were revised as the search continued. The PCG later reported 27 deaths and 43 survivors. The PCG also reported that at least 70 people were aboard the boat when it capsized, exceeding its authorized capacity of 42 passengers.

== Investigation ==
The PCG and Philippine National Police (PNP) investigated the capsizing. The PCG also relieved two personnel from their positions following the incident to allow a fair, honest and transparent investigation. Binangonan Mayor Cesar Ynares stated that both the PCG and the operator of the passenger boat must be held responsible for the deaths. He added that local officials have earlier cautioned against the dangers of overloaded passenger boats. The PCG found that the boat had more passengers than its authorized capacity. The boat was marked with a capacity of 42 passengers, while authorities later determined that 66 people were aboard during the incident. The boat's manifest listed only 22 passengers before departure. According to the PCG, the captain admitted that additional passengers were allowed to board after the manifest had been submitted to authorities.

Maritime Industry Authority (MARINA) suspended the Passenger Ship Safety Certificate (PSSC) of the M/B Aya Express following the incident. The suspension was effective immediately and remained in effect until further notice. The agency also conducted a marine safety investigation into the incident. On 2 August 2023, the PCG filed the syndicated estafa (fraud) complaint with the Office of the Prosecutor in Taytay, Rizal, against the owner and captain of the M/B Aya Express, as well as officials and members of the Talim Island Motorboat and Patrons Association (TIPMOPA), over alleged fraud and misrepresentation related to the boat.

=== Senate investigation ===
Senator Grace Poe filed Senate Resolution No. 704 seeking an investigation into the capsizing and the deaths of 27 people. The resolution sought to determine accountability for the incident and whether maritime safety regulations had been followed. Senator Raffy Tulfo separately filed Senate Resolution No. 705 calling for an investigation into the incident and possible charges against concerned officials of the PCG and MARINA. The proposed inquiry included questions about the boat's passenger capacity and whether passengers had been provided with life vests.

Senator Jinggoy Estrada called for those responsible for the actions or failures that may have contributed to the tragedy to be held accountable. Quezon City Representative Marvin Rillo questioned why passengers were not wearing life jackets, noting that such equipment was already standard practice on many maritime vessels and resorts.

During the Senate hearing, the boat captain admitted that he had given PCG personnel assigned to bananas worth ₱100 before the boat departed. PCG spokesperson Armando Balilo denied that coast guard personnel had asked for any goods from the captain. Police officer Jay Rivera, one of the coast guard personnel assigned to the area, admitted that he signed the passenger manifest without personally inspecting the boat before departure. He said the captain submitted the manifest, which listed 22 passengers, at the PCG office about 150 meters from the port. The MARINA also found that boat captain did not possess a valid boat captain's license.

== Aftermath ==
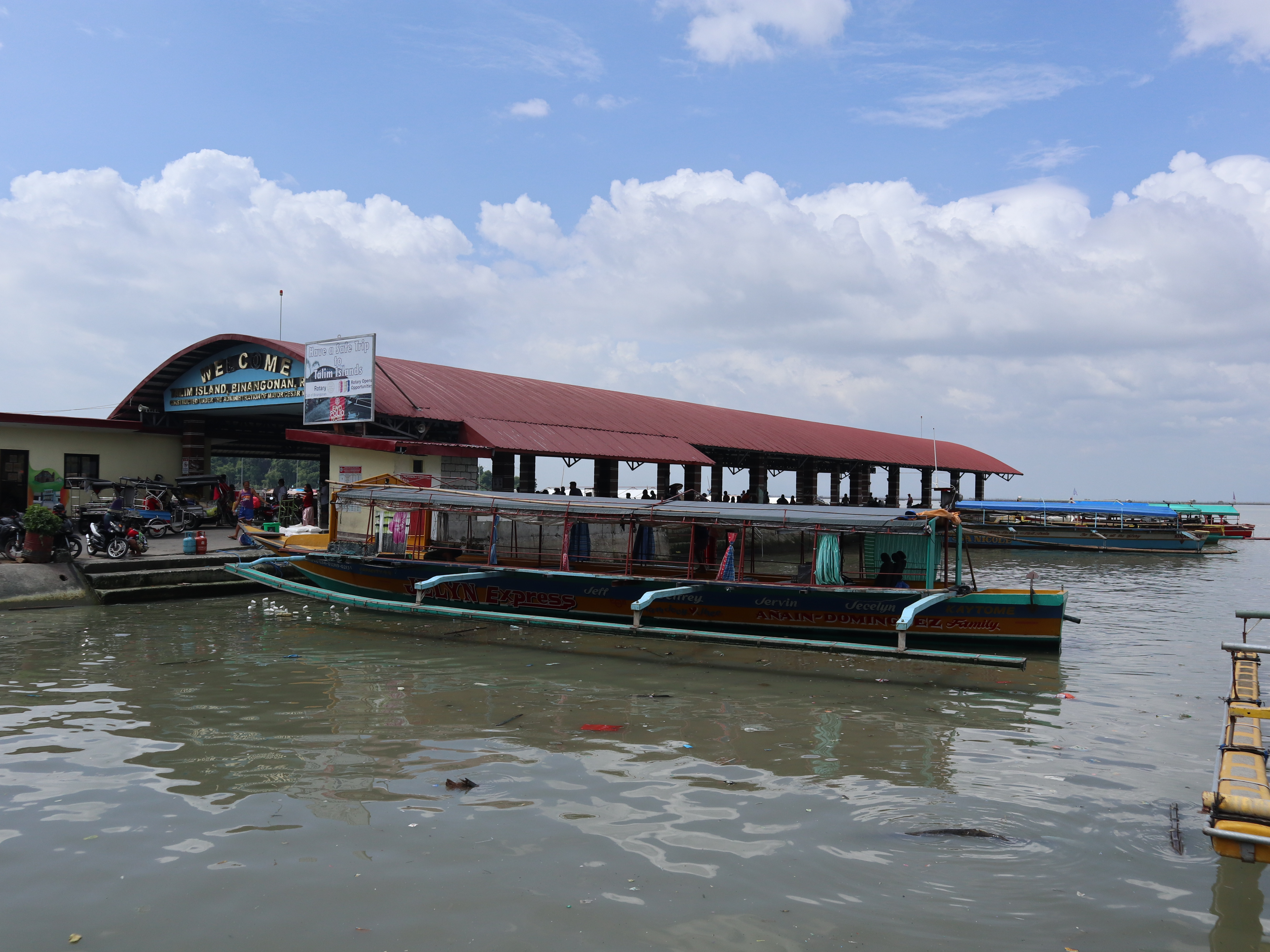
The waiting area at Pritil Port in Binangonan for passengers traveling to Talim Island.

The day after the capsizing, on 28 July 2023, MARINA suspended the boat's Passenger Ship Safety Certificate pending inspection and investigation. On 4 August, Senator Robin Padilla said that victims' families continued to seek justice. Following the capsizing, the PCG assumed control of Pritil Port and implemented stricter safety protocols, which include closer examination of passenger lists and setting limits for passenger capacity at the same time. Boat captains were required to submit passenger manifests and permits at a PCG checkpoint, where personnel would compare passenger numbers with the authorized capacity. The measures also included reminding passengers to wear life jackets, photographing departing boats and separating heavy cargo from passengers' belongings. The PCG said the measures were intended to strengthen the enforcement of existing maritime safety regulations and improve inspections.

The incident continued to affect survivors and residents of Talim Island, the intended destination of the boat. Survivor Moises Bueza later described difficulty boarding a motorized boat because of his experience during the incident. He eventually returned to a boat to help in the search operations. Government agencies and local authorities also provided assistance to victims' families, survivors and responders. The Department of Social Welfare and Development (DSWD), the Rizal provincial government and the Binangonan local government provided a combined ₱655,000 in assistance, along with psychosocial support.

On 4 September 2023, friends and family members of the victims joined the 40-day memorial at Pritil Port, where they prayed for the victims while lighting candles and putting flowers. The memorial also included calls for justice for the victims.
