= Mount Tagapo =

Mountain on the Talim lake island, Laguna de Bay, Philippines

- Bundok Susong Dalaga
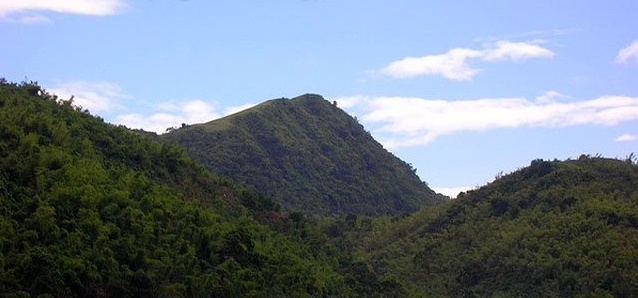

Highest point
- Elevation: 438 m (1,437 ft)
- Coordinates: 14°20′21″N 121°13′57″E

Geography
- Location within Philippines
- Location: Talim Island
- Country: Philippines
- Region: Calabarzon
- Province: Rizal
- Municipalities: Binangonan; Cardona
- Parent range: western rim of the Laguna Caldera

Geology
- Mountain type: Mountain or ridge peak
- Volcanic field: Laguna Caldera

Climbing
- Easiest route: Brgy. Janosa Trail from Binangonan

Mount Tagapo, also known as Susong Dalaga, is a conical peak on the lake island of Talim on Laguna de Bay, the largest lake in the Philippines. The mountain ridge is 438 m (1,437 ft) in elevation and the highest point of Talim Island. The peak falls under the respective jurisdictions of the towns of Binangonan and Cardona in Rizal province, Calabarzon region.

== Etymology ==
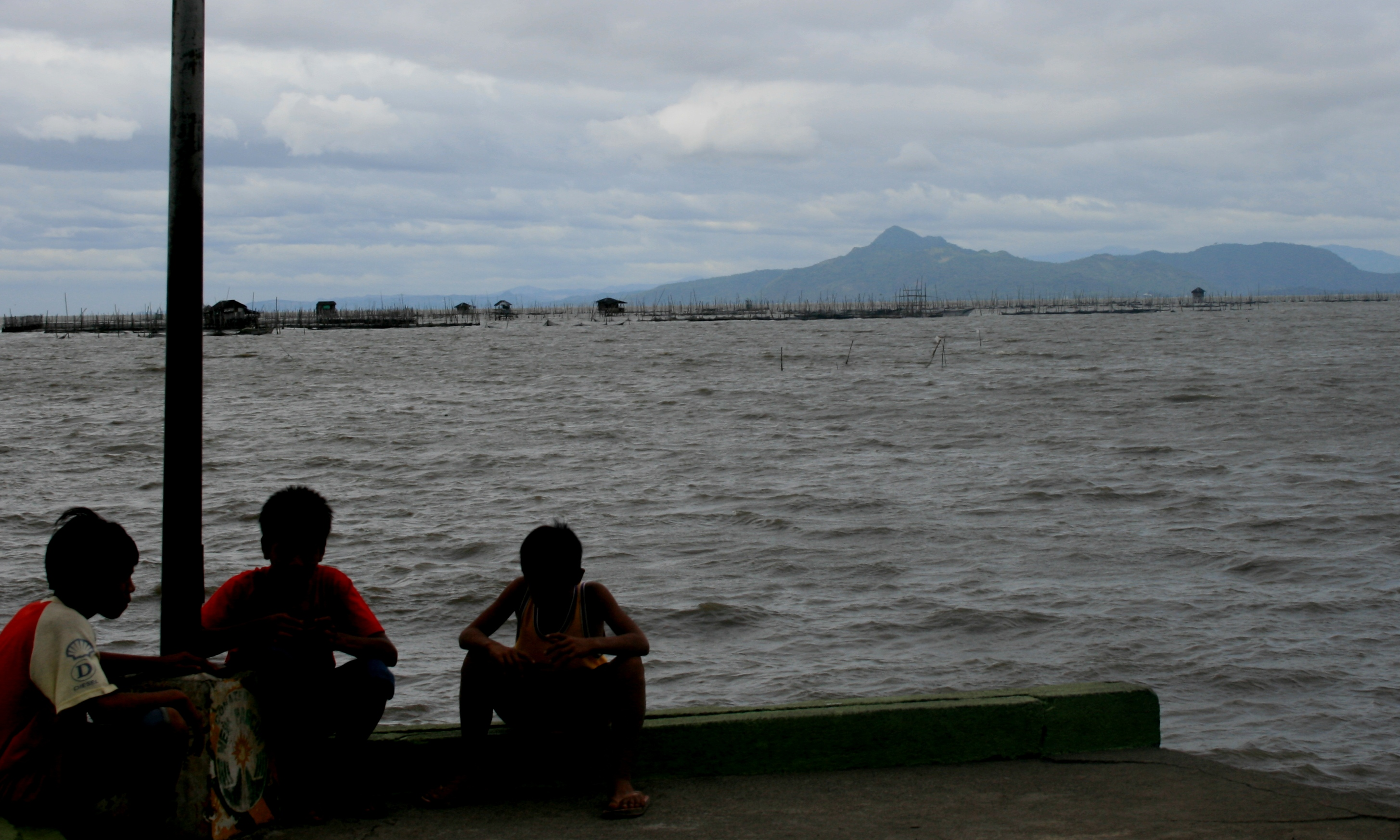
Talim Island with Mt. Tagapo, its highest peak, as seen from Los Baños pier in Laguna province

The name is derived from the Tagalog word tagâ, "to chop". The island's name, talím ("blade") may refer to its outline on maps, which looks like a short sword. The peak is also locally known as Bundók Susong Dalaga (literally, “mount maiden breast”), due to its conical shape.

== Geography ==
The peak falls under the jurisdiction of the towns of Binangonan and Cardona, which divide the island almost into two halves, the west (Binangonan) and east (Cardona). In the middle of the 15-kilometre (9.3 mi) long Talim Island island is a volcanic ridge with Mount Tagapo, its highest peak. The island forms the southwestern rim of the Laguna Caldera, a large caldera that occupies the middle section of Laguna de Bay. Mount Sembrano range, across the lake on the Jalajala Peninsula, forms the eastern and the highest peak of the caldera.

Mount Tagapo lies at the latitudinal center of Talim Island at the point, about a third of the island from its southern tip, where a shorter ridge measuring 3.5-kilometre (2.2 mi) long intersects the island on its eastern side forming a T-junction. Southeast and west of Mount Tagapo peak are craters formed after the formation of the caldera.

== Climbing the mountain ==
Mount Tagapo is frequented by local climbers for the panoramic views from its location at the center of Laguna de Bay. The hike to Mount Tagapo starts with a ferry boat ride from the Port of Binangonan. The boats do not leave unless full; and they stop at every barangay port of Talim, encircling the island before returning to Binangonan Port.

The peak is reached in 1.5 to 2 hours and may be ascended from either Binangonan or Cardona sides of the mountain, based on difficulty. The trail hike from the western side is easy to moderate, starting from Barangay Janosa in Binangonan. Climbers register and pay a fee at the barangay hall where hired guides are available. A steeper and more challenging hike to the top is taken when ascended from the eastern side of the mountain, starting from Barangay Lambac in Cardona, also where guides may be hired at the barangay hall. It is also possible to traverse the mountain from one town to the other, but guides are for the uphill hike only, as they must return to their hometowns.

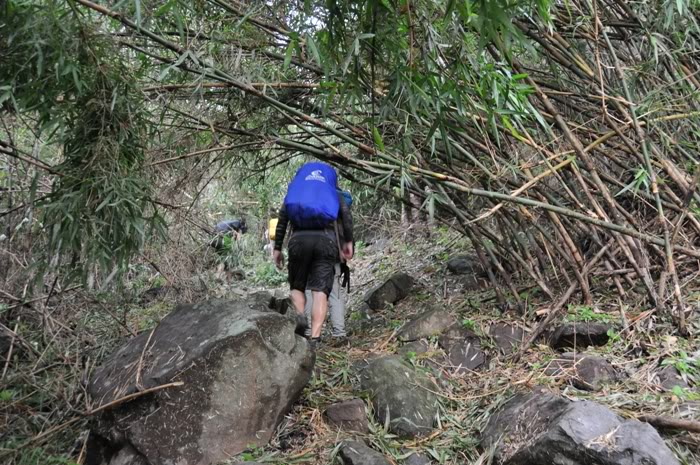
Mountaineers trekking through the forest near the beginning of the hike

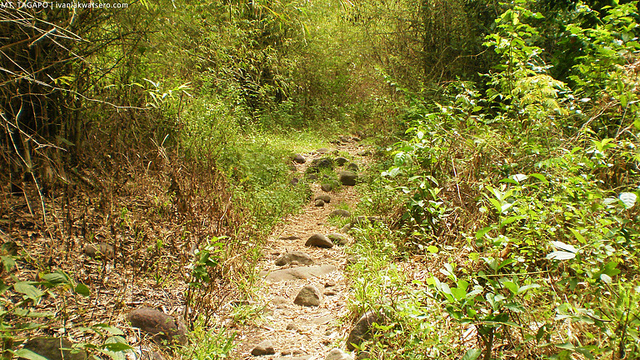
Trail with the bamboo forest ahead

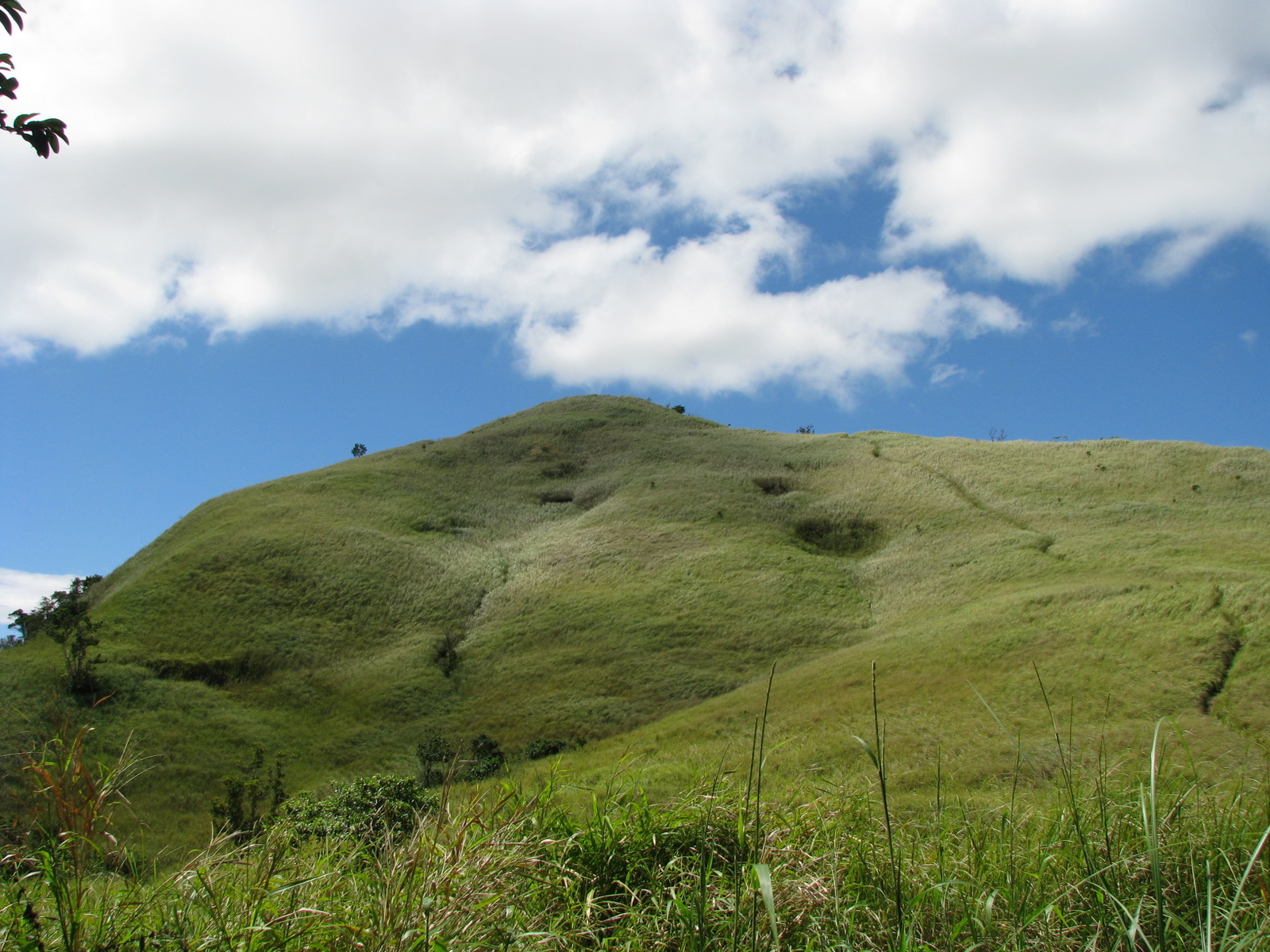
The tall cogon grass field near Mt. Tagapo's peak with the trail visible on the right slope

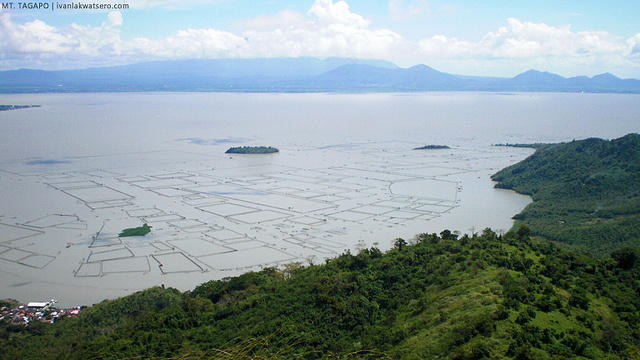
The cloud-covered Mount Banahaw as seen from the top of Mt. Tagapo

The climb to the top can be very hot during summer as there is no shade on the upper slope. The initial part starts with a trek through forests of trees and bamboos. Villagers make their livelihood by manufacturing bamboo products. Near the middle of the hike, the trail changes into a field of tall cogon grass, which could grow up to 5 ft (1.5 m). Their leaves can be very sharp and could cut skin or poke someone's eyes especially on windy days.

Upon reaching the barren top, a 360-degree view of the entire Laguna de Bay and its coastal towns can be beheld, including the skylines of Metro Manila to the northwest. Mountains visible include nearby Mount Sembrano to volcanic mountains like the three peaks of Mount Banahaw volcano complex (from left to right, Mounts Banahaw de Lucban, Banahaw and San Cristobal) in the southward direction with Mounts Atimbia and Kalisungan (aka Mount Nagcarlan) before the complex; to the southwest, Mount Makiling with the farther Mount Macolod and Mount Sungay to its right; to the far north, Mt. Arayat on a very clear day; and eastward are the nameless mountains of the Sierra Madre mountain range.
