= Laguna Caldera =

Underwater volcanic caldera in Laguna de Bay, Philippines

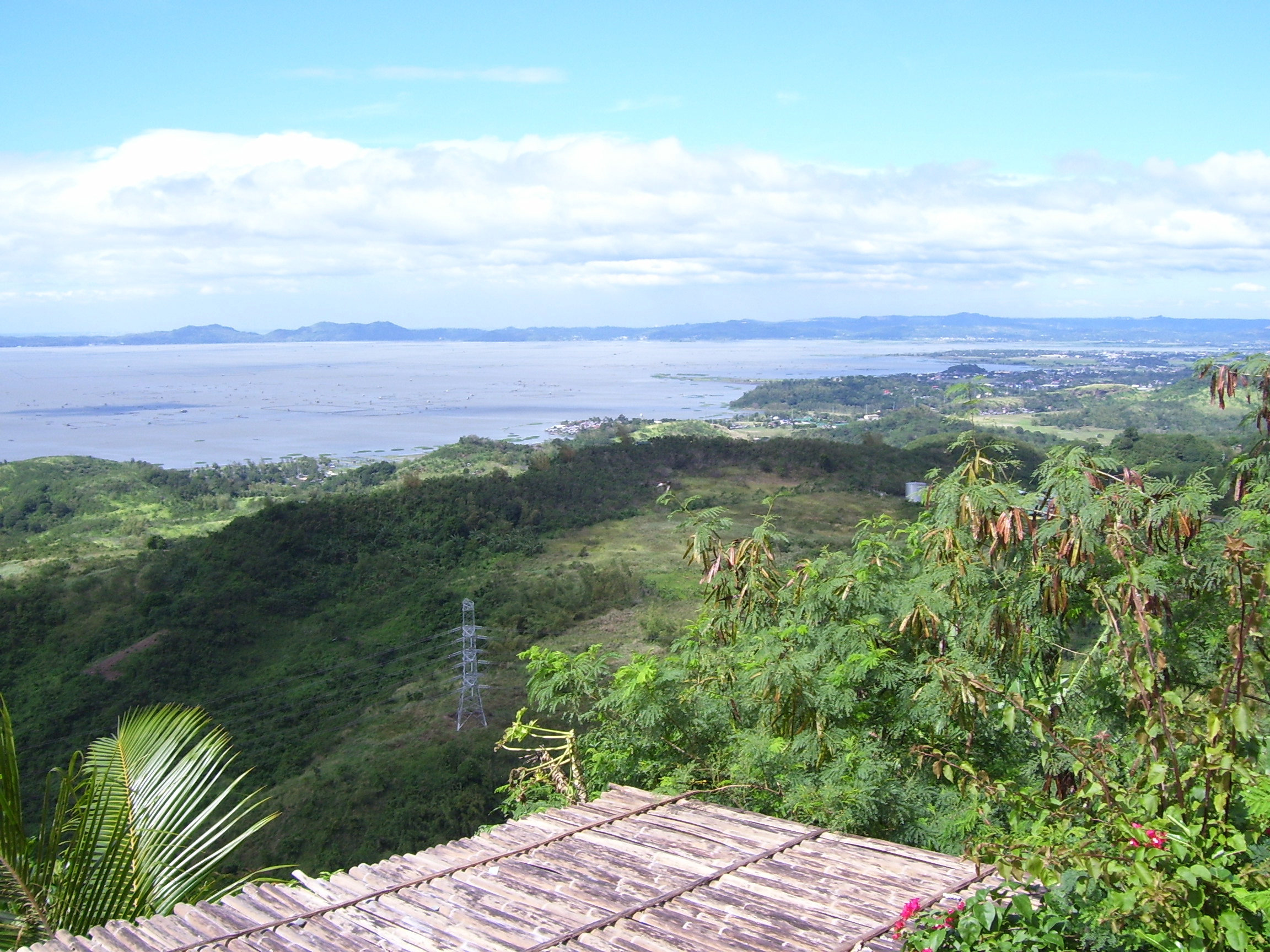
- Laguna Caldera looking northwest

Highest point
- Elevation: 743 m (2,438 ft)
- Coordinates: 14°25′N 121°16′E

Geography
- Location within Philippines
- Location: Rizal, Philippines

Geology
- Rock age: Pleistocene
- Mountain type: Caldera
- Volcanic zone: Macolod Corridor
- Volcanic arc: Luzon Volcanic Arc,
- Last eruption: Approx. 1.2 Million Years Ago and 29-27ka

Laguna Caldera is a dormant Pleistocene caldera and a geographical depression in Rizal, Philippines. It is broadly elliptical in shape, with dimensions of 20 by 10 km. It has a summit, Mount Sembrano, with an elevation of 743 metres (2,438 ft). The caldera forms the middle lobe of Laguna de Bay, bound by the Morong Peninsula and Talim Island to the west, and the Jalajala Peninsula to the east.

The caldera may have formed in two stages about 1 million and 27,000-29,000 years ago, during which time at least two major explosive eruptions took place. It is unknown when the Laguna Caldera last erupted but it may have been active during the Holocene. Deposits from the caldera form thick ignimbrite sheets in Rizal, Metro Manila, Laguna, and Bulacan. Remnants of volcanic activity include undated maars at the southern end of Talim Island and a solfatara field on nearby Mount Sembrano. Given the current shape of the lake and the caldera, and how it was once connected to Manila Bay as evidenced by its ground drill geology, its formation is speculated to have been a result of an even earlier cataclysmic eruption, pointing to a possibility that it was once a volcano of considerable elevation that exploded, similar to Krakatoa. The Pleistocene Diliman tuff formation in Metro Manila might be related to it though there are slight variations in composition. A solfataric field is located on the southern flank of Mount Sembrano, on the eastern rim of the caldera.

== Photographs ==
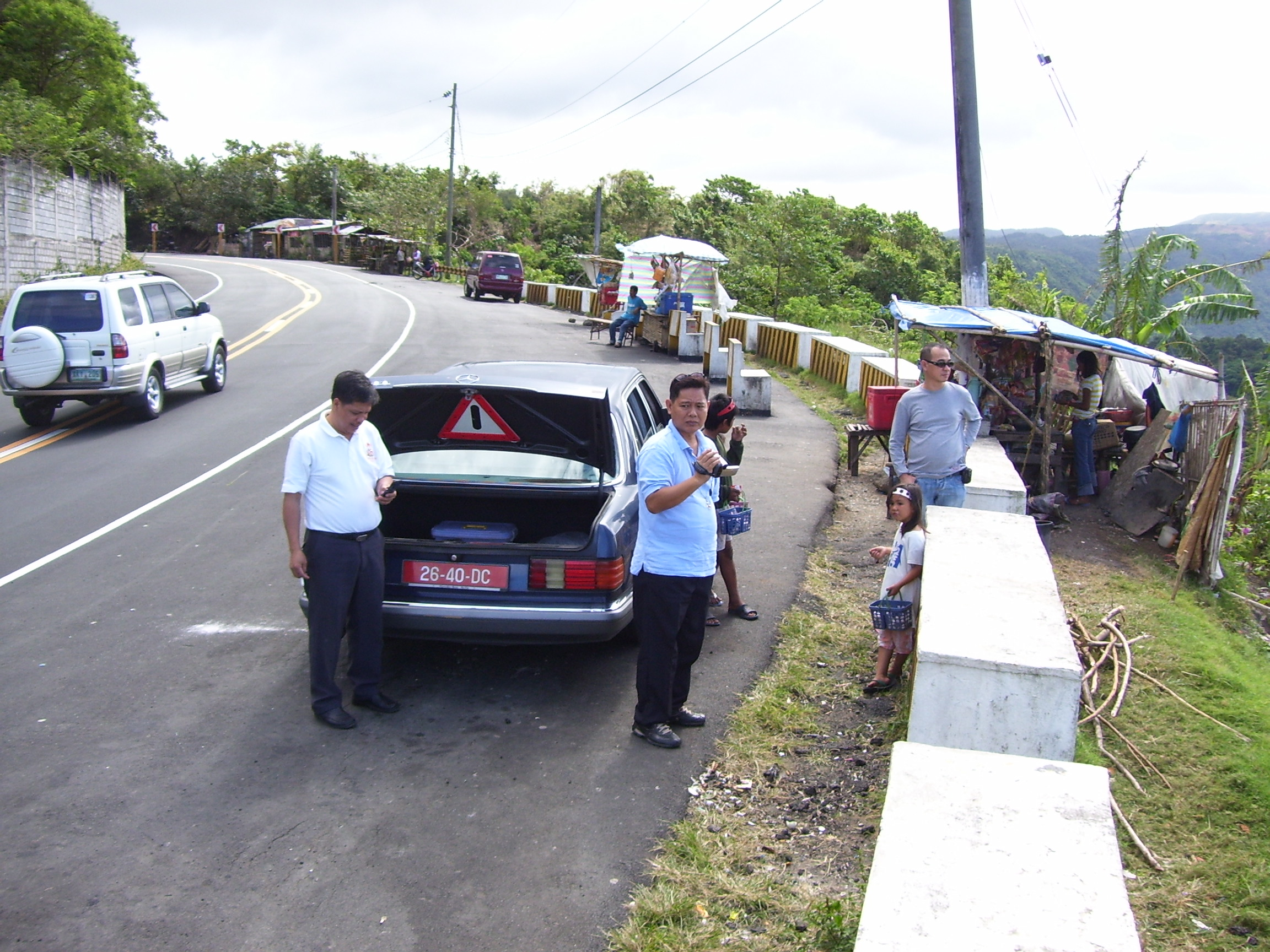
Laguna Caldera looking east

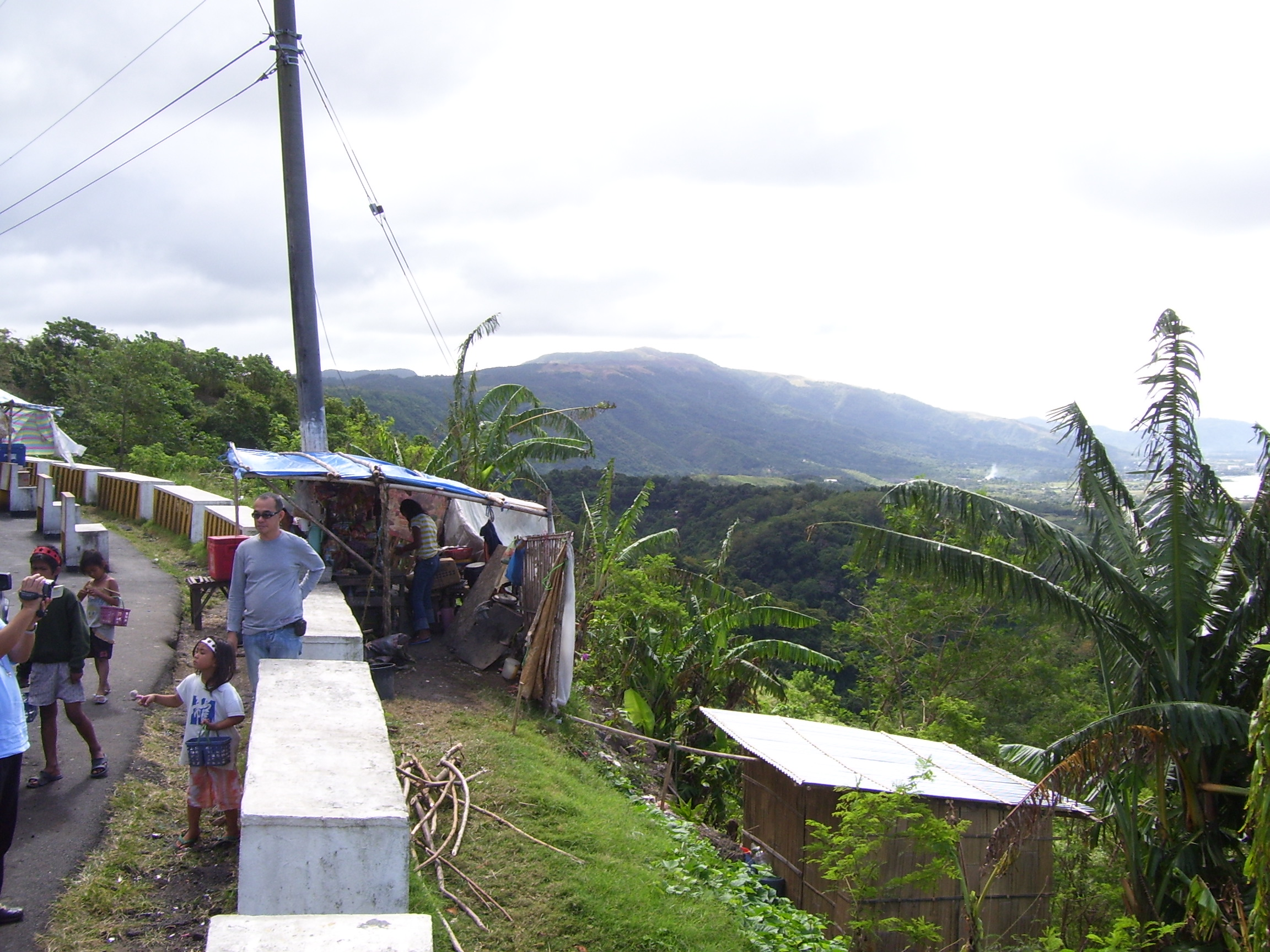
Laguna Caldera looking south-east

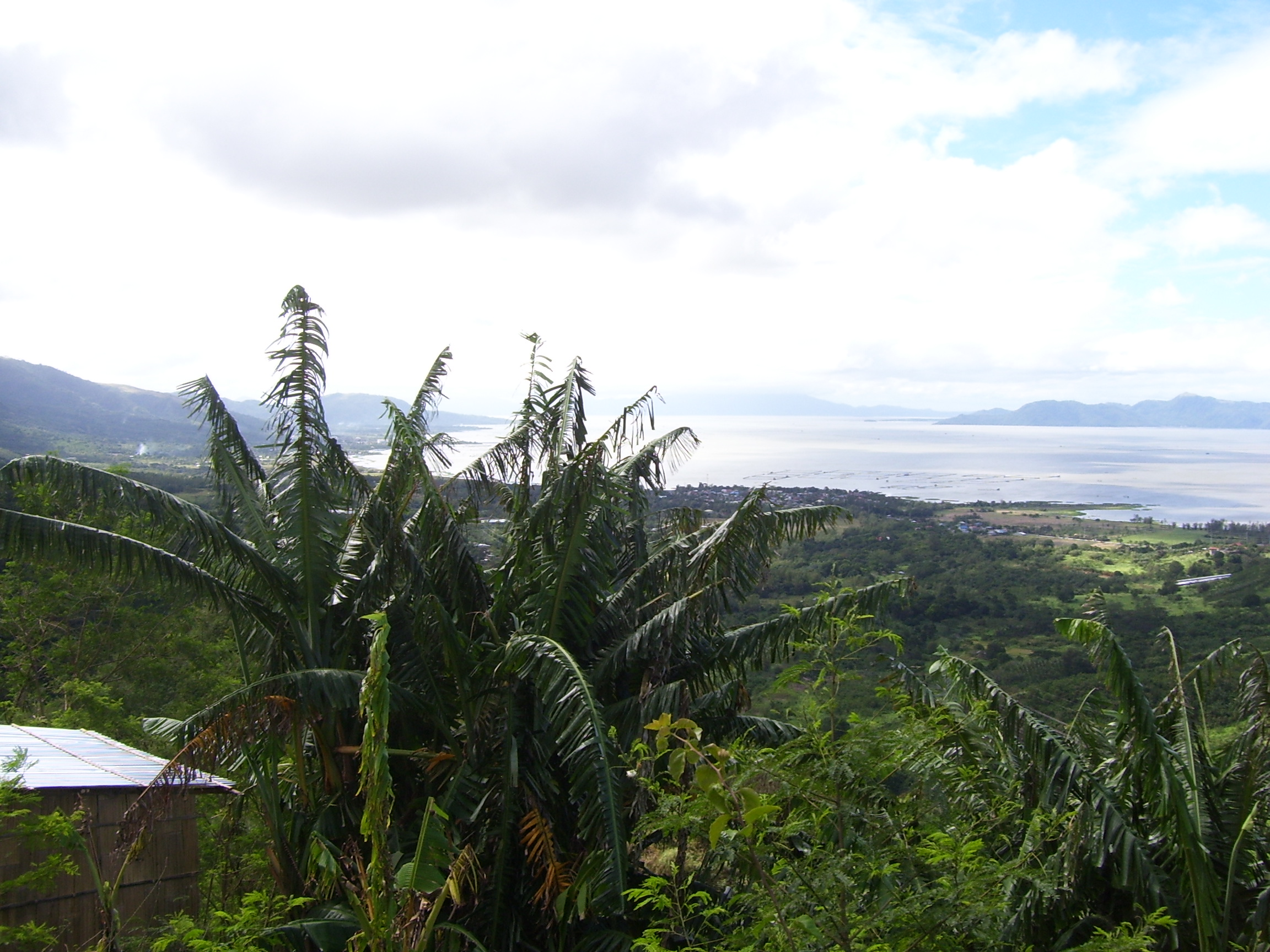
Laguna Caldera looking south

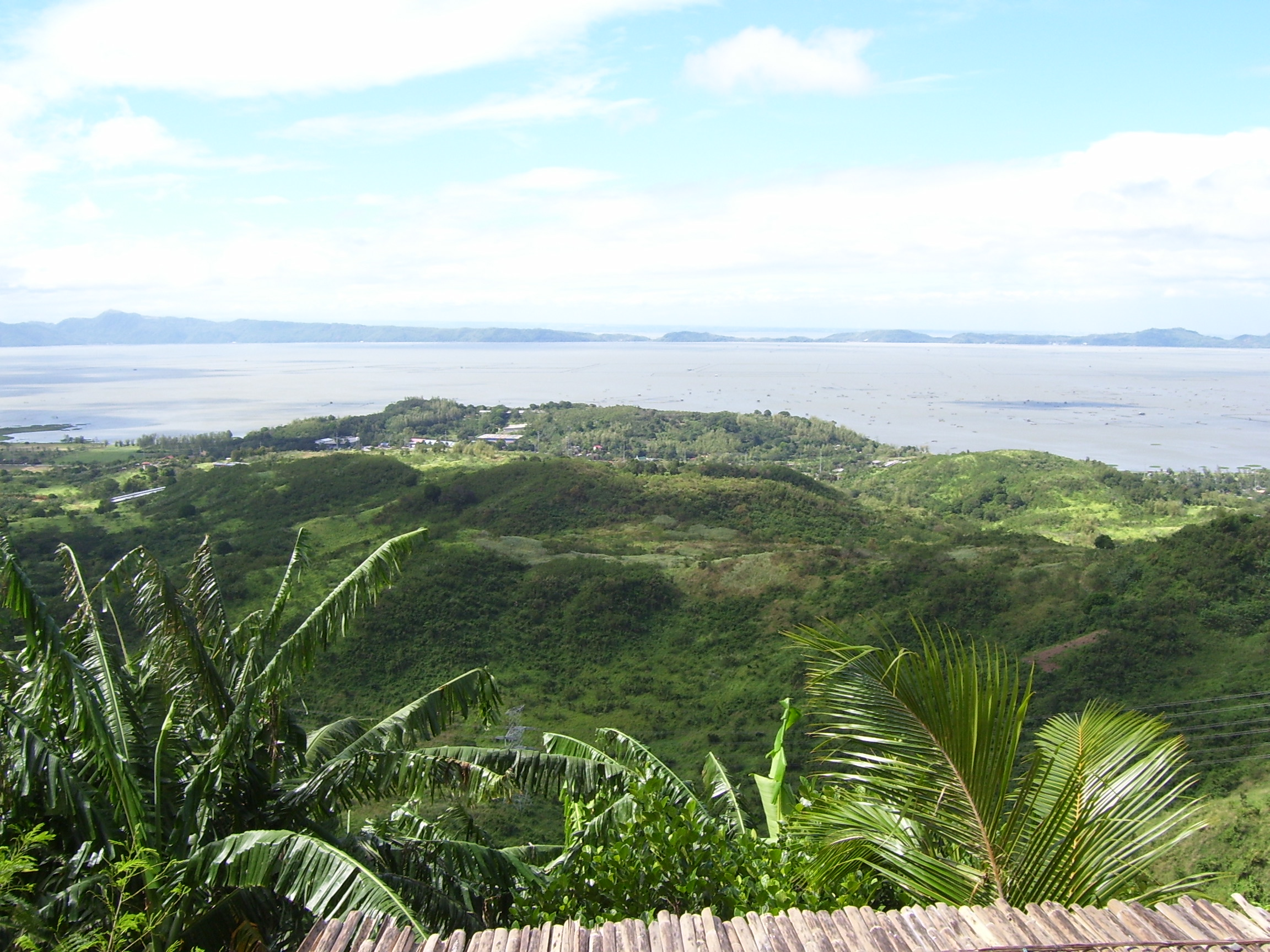
Laguna Caldera looking west

== See also ==
- List of active volcanoes in the Philippines
- List of potentially active volcanoes in the Philippines
- List of inactive volcanoes in the Philippines
- Philippine Institute of Volcanology and Seismology
- Ring of Fire
