= Talim Island =

Largest lake island in Laguna de Bay, Philippines

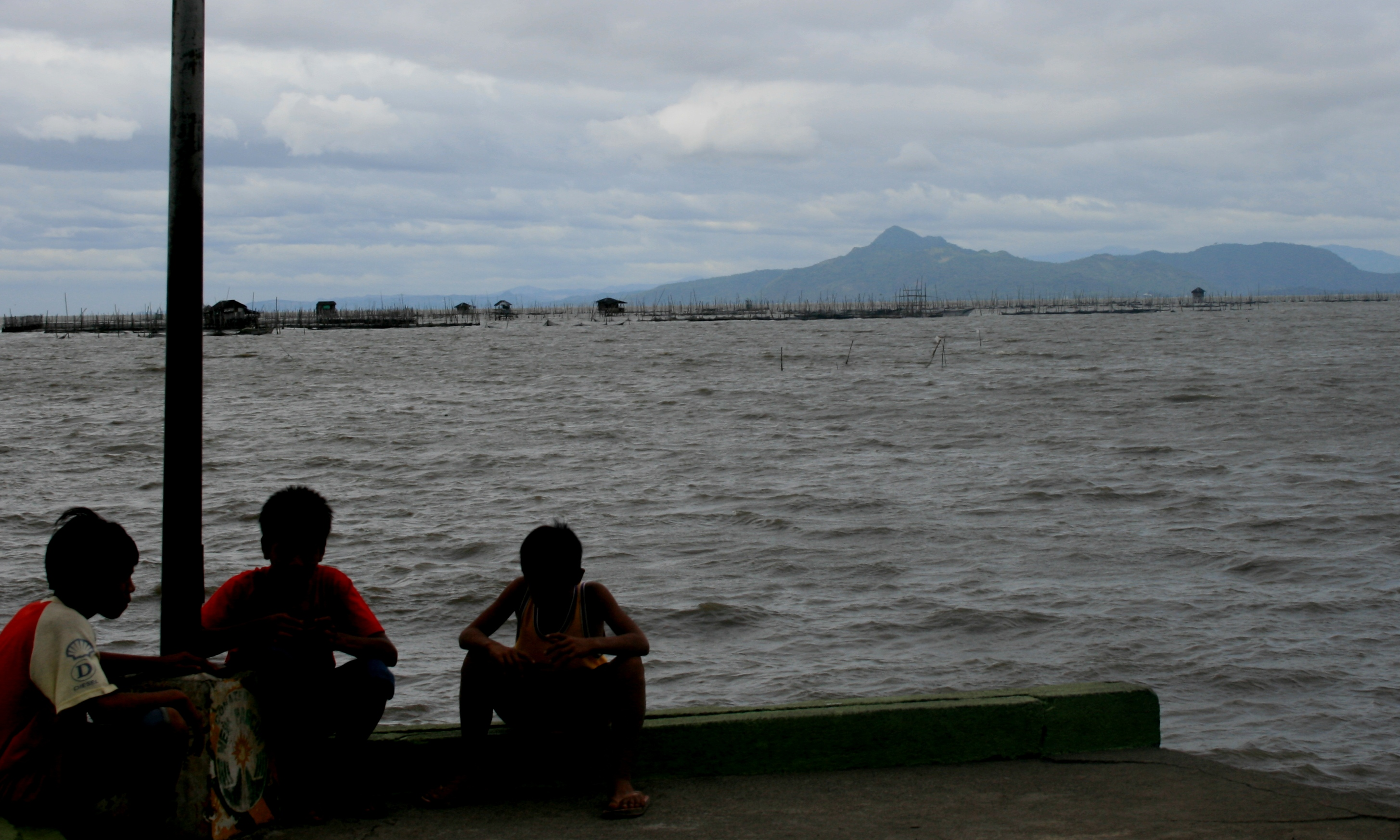
- Talim Island with Mount Tagapo as seen from Los Baños pier at dusk

- Location within Philippines

Geography
- Location: Laguna de Bay
- Coordinates: 14°21′7″N 121°13′54″E

Administration
- Philippines
- Region: Calabarzon
- Province: Rizal
- Municipalities: Binangonan; Cardona

Demographics
- Population: 40,018 (as of 2020)

Additional information

Talim Island is the largest lake island in Laguna de Bay, the largest lake in the Philippines. The island politically governed by the Province of Rizal, split between two municipalities: Binangonan on the western side, and Cardona on the eastern half. The island is volcanic in origin and forms the southwest rim of the Laguna Caldera. Volcanism after the formation of the caldera created the maars and volcanic craters at the southern end of the island, the largest of which is a 3-kilometre (1.9 mi) crater surrounding Barangays Balibago and Tuna.

== History ==
Marking's Guerrillas operated on the island in 1943, during World War II.

== Geography ==
Talim Island is located almost at the center of Laguna de Bay, a three-lobed lake the center of which is the Laguna Caldera. The northernmost tip of the island is separated from the mainland by Diablo Pass, which is only about 240 meters (790 ft) at the narrowest. The southernmost tip of the island is called Talim Point.

The highest point of the island is Mount Tagapo, known locally as "Bundok ng Susong Dalaga" (Maiden's breast mountains) for the conical hill at its peak resembling the female breast. The hill is among the several in the Tagalog region that are called as such because of its shape. This feature is best observed from neighboring Mount Sembrano in the Jalajala peninsula across the lake.

== Political subdivision ==
The island consists of 24 barangays that lie along its shores, 17 belong to the town of Binangonan and 7 to Cardona.

Binangonan	Cardona
Bangad; Binitagan; Bombong; Buhangin; Ginoong Sanay; Gulod; Habagatan; Janosa; Kasile; Kaytome; Kinaboogan; Kinagatan; Malakaban; Pinagdilawan; Rayap; Sapang; Tabon	Balibago; Boor; Lambac; Malanggam; Navotas; Subay; Tuna

Map of Rizal highlighting Talim Island

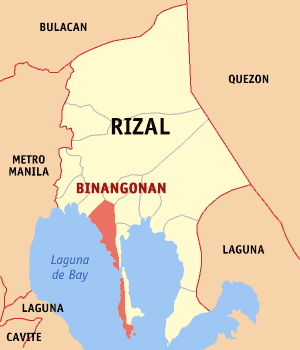
Binangonan portion

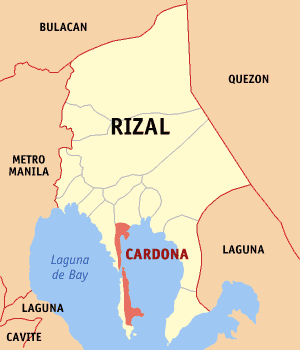
Cardona portion

== Economy ==
The island is rich in bamboo, which the islanders make into different types of furniture such as bamboo sofas, cabinets, tables, chairs and a lot more. It is their main source of living, while lake fishing is only secondary.

Also, along the lake are fish pens that supports the everyday needs of the islanders.

== See also ==
- Laguna de Bay
- Laguna Lake Development Authority
- Breast shaped hills
