= Mount Sembrano =

Volcano on the island of Luzon, Philippines

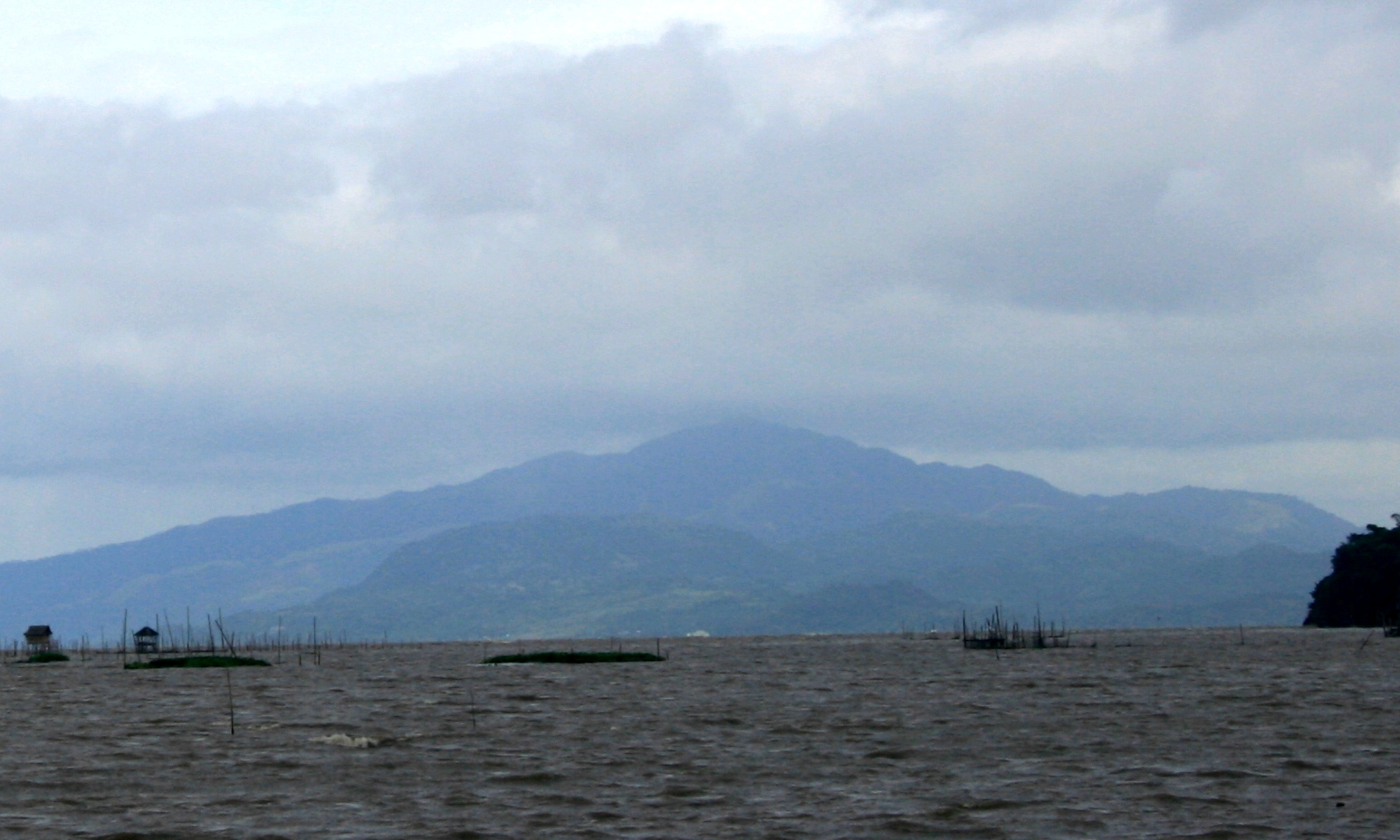
- The mountain as seen from the shores of Laguna de Bay in Los Baños, Laguna

Highest point
- Elevation: 745 m (2,444 ft)
- Listing: Mountains in the Philippines
- Coordinates: 14°23′00″N 121°21′57″E

Geography
- Location within Philippines
- Location: Luzon
- Country: Philippines
- Region: Calabarzon
- Provinces: Laguna; Rizal
- Municipalities: Jalajala; Pakil; Pililla

Geology
- Mountain type: Extinct stratovolcano with a solfataric field on its southern tip
- Last eruption: 27,000–29,000 years ago

Climbing
- Easiest route: from Barangay Malaya in Pililla, Rizal

Mount Sembrano is a volcano located between Rizal and Laguna of the Calabarzon region in the Philippines. It is situated about 60 kilometers (37 mi) east by road from the capital city of Manila.

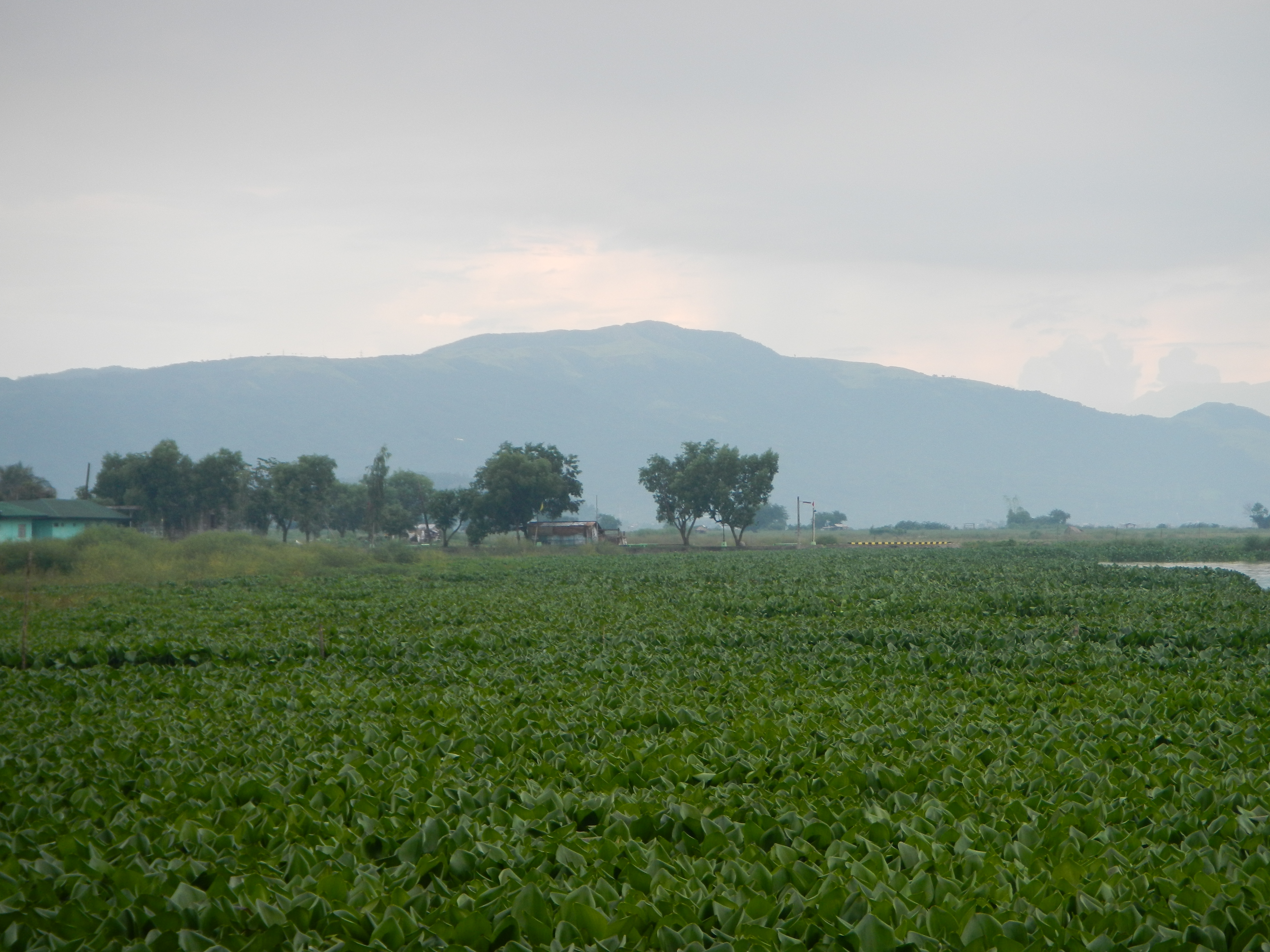
Mount Sembrano as seen from Boulevard, Barangay Wawa, Pililla, Rizal (Laguna de Bay).

== Geography ==
Mount Sembrano lies between the boundaries of the towns of Jalajala and Pililla in Rizal province and the town of Pakil in Laguna. The mountain sits at the helm of Jalajala peninsula along the shore of Laguna de Bay and is surrounded by the lake on three sides. Along with Talim Island, the mountain forms the southeastern rim of the Laguna Caldera.

== Hiking ==
Once a haven of New People's Army insurgents, the mountain is now a popular hiking destination offering a commanding view of Laguna de Bay, Talim Island, and the Tagalog provinces of Rizal and Laguna. Mount Susong Dalaga (Maiden's breast Mountain), a conical hill resembling the female breast which is the highest peak of neighboring Talim Island, is best observed from Mt. Sembrano. Other mountains visible from the summit are Mount Banahaw, Mount Makiling and the Sierra Madre Mountains.

=== Starting point ===
The most common starting point for the climb up the mountain is from the Barangay Hall of Malaya in Pililla, where climbers must register themselves. The hike to the grassy summit, which is fully exposed to the sun, takes about three to four hours. Another trail starts from the Laguna side of the mountain in the town of Pakil but is rarely used.

=== Our Lady of Maulawin ===
Mount Sembrano is considered sacred by some people and known for the legend of the miraculous discovery of the icon of Our Lady of Maulawin. In 1909, a group of loggers climbed Mt. Sembrano to cut logs. Felipe Reyno was the one who cut a maulawin tree. The five logs were sold in Santa Cruz, Laguna. In 1910, when an intended shelter for cows was started, the posts was prepared first. A carpenter took the maulawin log (molave) but his saw broke because not only it was young, but it was also very hard. He borrowed another saw to continue the cutting, he was completely amazed to see an image of the Virgin Mary imprinted in it. He claimed it was completely supernatural because resembling like lead in a pencil, any part of the log if cut it has the same image even to the trunks and branches. Two cuts of wood are now enshrined at the Aglipayan church of Santa Cruz in Laguna, one in the side altar and another in an adjacent chapel dedicated for her. A small chapel is placed on the site where the image was discovered.

=== Other points of interest ===
Another point along the trail is a big boulder referred to as the Simbahan (Church) where pilgrims leave candles on the huge rock where footprints imprinted on top are supposedly left by the Virgin Mary.

Five minutes off the trail is the small Manggahan waterfall. The falls provide water for overnight campers and day trekkers.

== See also ==
- Perceptions of religious imagery in natural phenomena
