= Bay, Laguna =

Municipality in Laguna, Philippines

Bay Bae
- Municipality
- Municipality of Bay
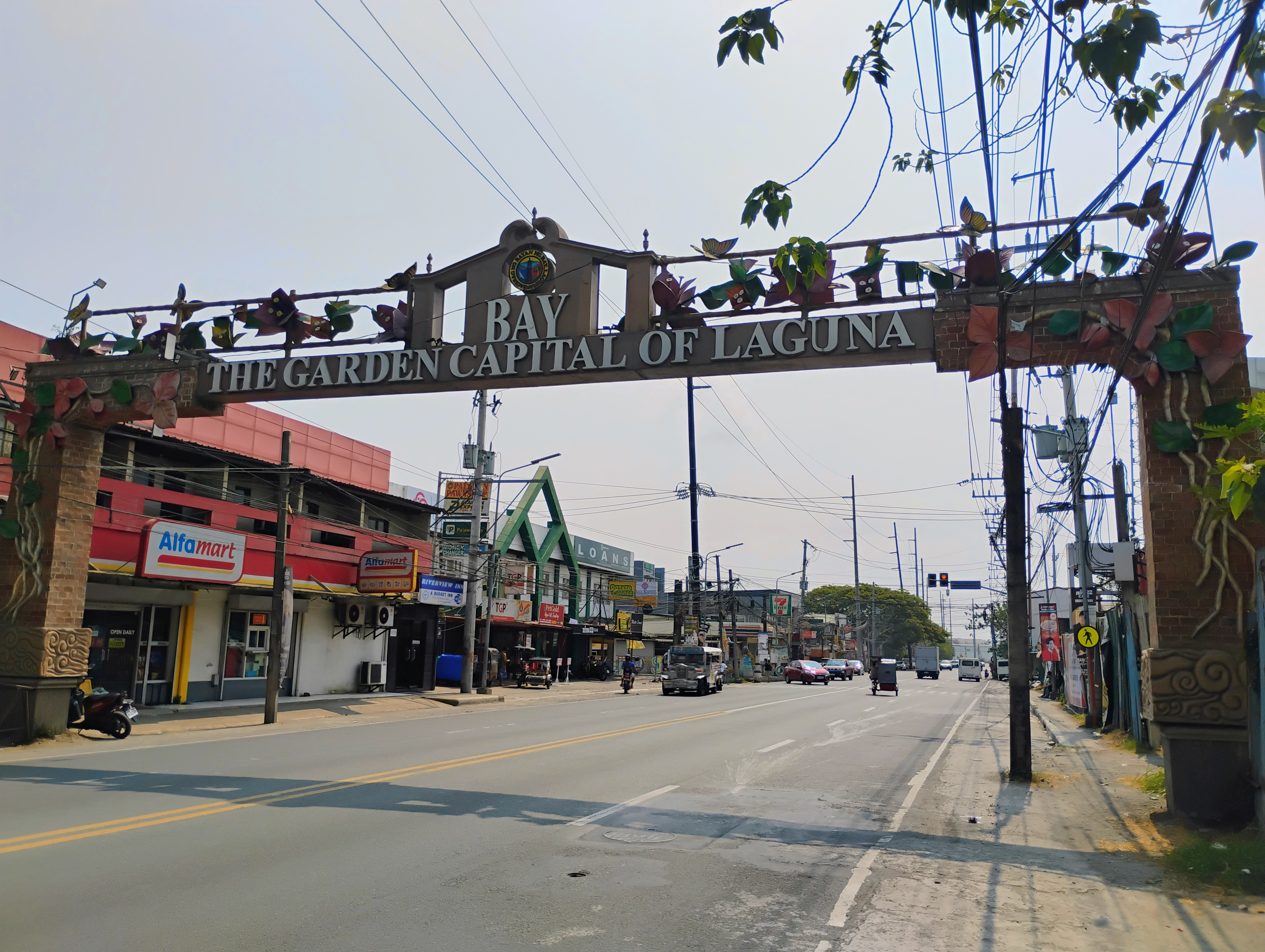
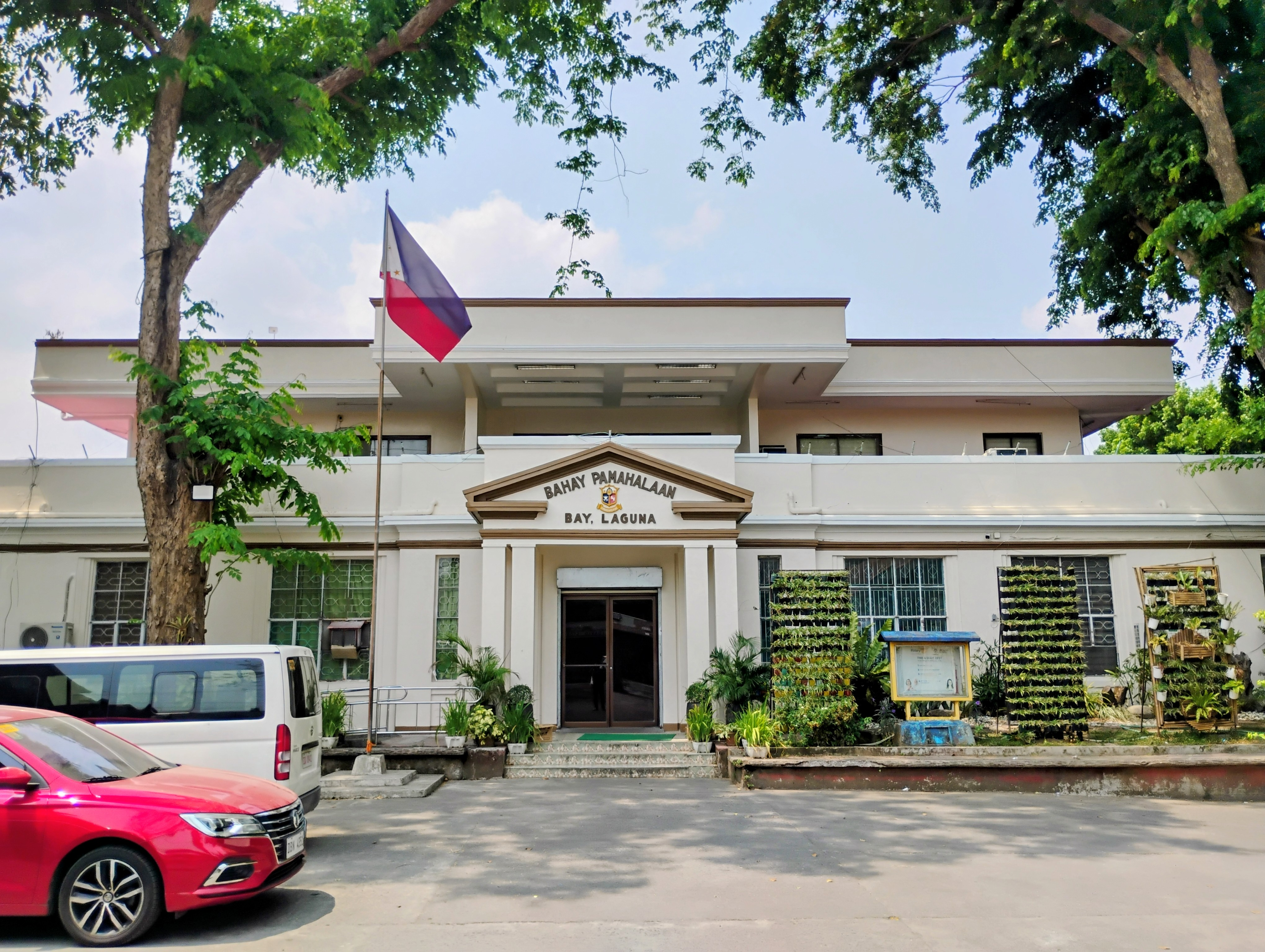
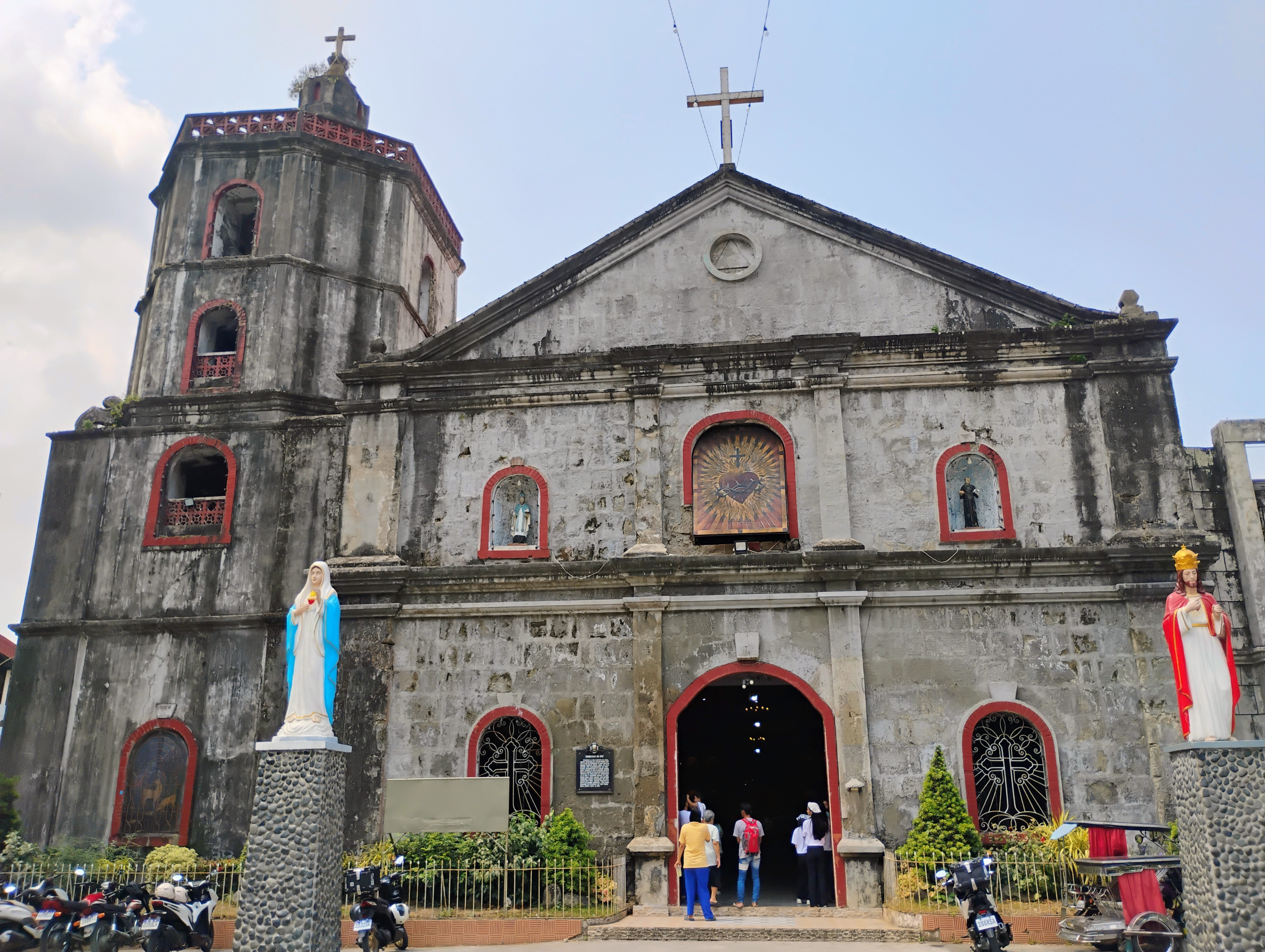
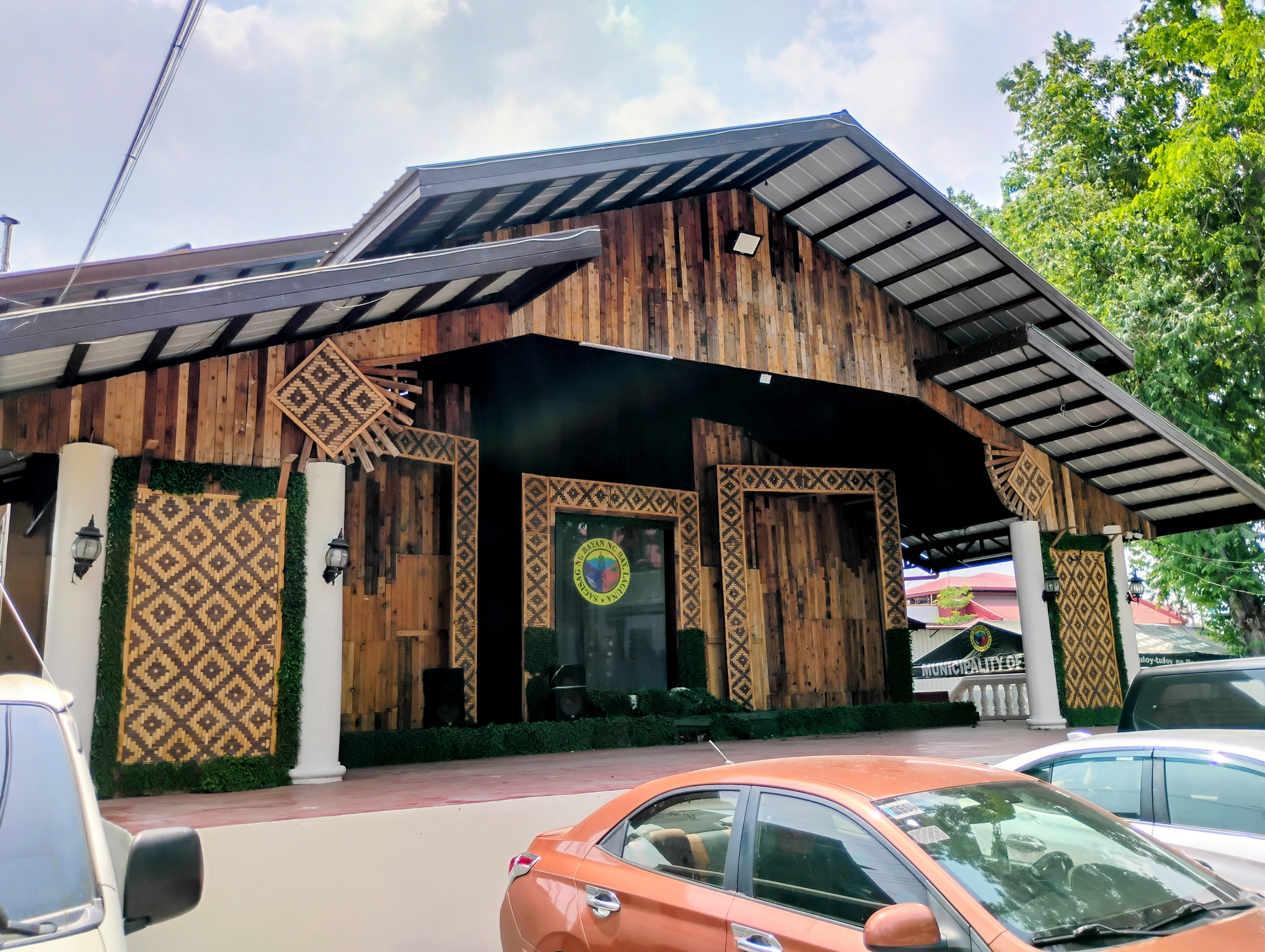
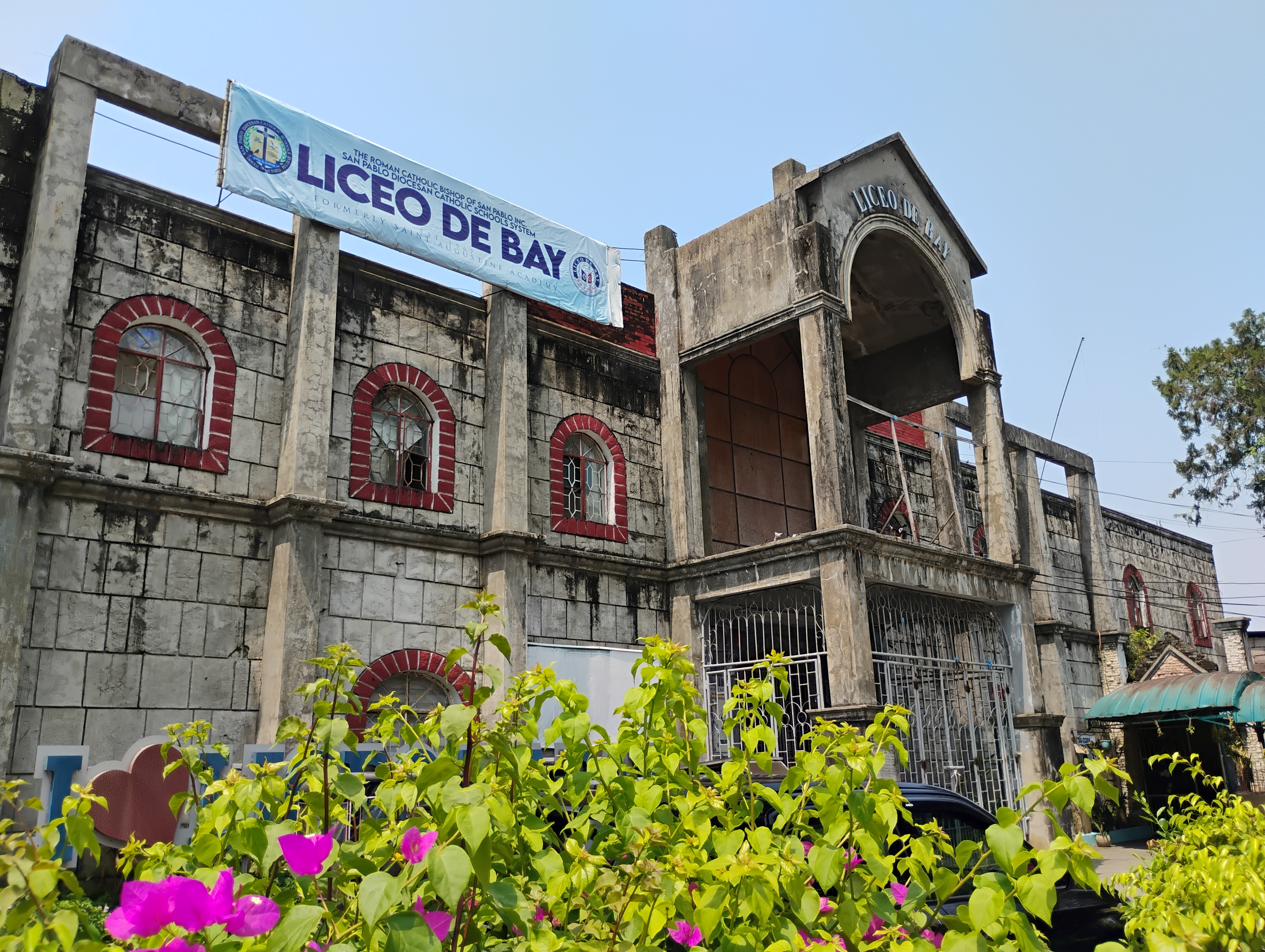
- From top, left to right: Welcome Arch at National Highway, Bay Municipal Hall, San Agustin Parish Church, Tanghalang Bayeños, Liceo de Bay

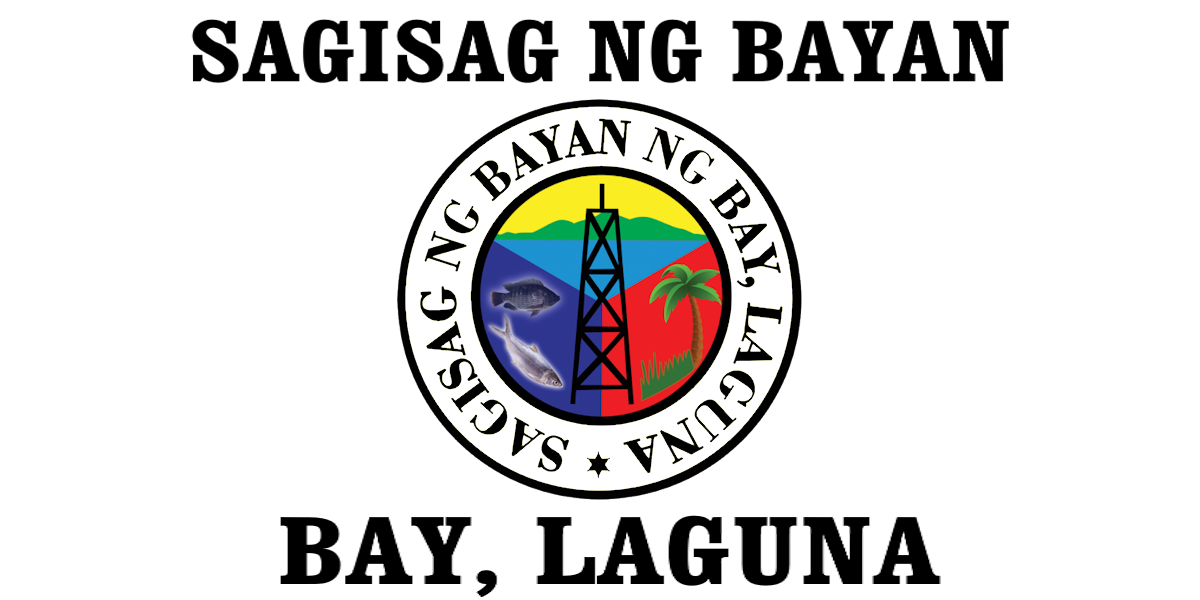
- Flag Seal
- Nicknames: The Garden Capital of Laguna; Old Capital of Laguna
- Map of Laguna with Bay highlighted
- Interactive map of Bay
- Location within the Philippines
- Coordinates: 14°11′N 121°17′E
- Country: Philippines
- Region: Calabarzon
- Province: Laguna
- District: 2nd district
- Founded: April 30, 1578
- Barangays: 15 (see Barangays)

Government
  - Type: Sangguniang Bayan
  - Mayor: Michael M. Punzalan
  - Vice Mayor: Julian Rod 'Kiko' Padrid
  - Representative: Ramil L. Hernandez
  - Municipal Council: Members: Julian Rod R. Padrid; Rommel B. Ilagan; Dan Wesson D. Dimasuay; Cesar D. Comia; Joselito O. Gutierrez; Angelito M. De Mesa; Ryan R. Villegas; Emerson M. Ilagan
  - Electorate: 47,245 voters (2025)

Area
  - Total: 42.66 km^{2} (16.47 sq mi)
- Elevation: 17 m (56 ft)
- Highest elevation: 336 m (1,102 ft)
- Lowest elevation: 1 m (3.3 ft)

Population (2024 census)
  - Total: 69,802
  - Rank: 10 out of 30 (in Laguna)
  - Density: 1,636/km^{2} (4,238/sq mi)
  - Households: 17,848
- Demonym: Baeño/Bayeño

Economy
  - Income class: 1st municipal income class
  - Poverty incidence: 7.26% (2023)
  - Revenue: ₱ 297.1 million (2024)
  - Assets: ₱ 651.2 million (2024)
  - Expenditure: ₱ 302.3 million (2024)
  - Liabilities: ₱ 158.3 million (2024)

Service provider
  - Electricity: Manila Electric Company (Meralco)
- Time zone: UTC+8 (PST)
- ZIP code: 4033
- PSGC: 0403402000
- IDD : area code: +63 (0)49
- Native languages: Tagalog
- Patron saint: Augustine of Hippo
- Website: bay.gov.ph

Bay (/bəˈɛ/ ba-EH), officially the Municipality of Bay (Tagalog: Bayan ng Bay) and colloquially known as Bae (Tagalog pronunciation: [bɐˈʔɛ]), is a municipality in the province of Laguna, Philippines. According to the 2024 census, it has a population of 69,802 people.

The patron saint of Bay is Augustine of Hippo, whose feast day is celebrated on August 28. The adjacent Laguna de Bay, the country's largest freshwater lake, is named after the town.

== Etymology ==
In the old Tagalog language, the name Bay derives from the same phonetic roots as "baybay" (shore) and as "babae" (woman) and "babaylan" (priestess). The name can thus be thought of either as a reference to the shore of the lake or to a great lady (cf. Sanskrit bai). In the case of the latter, it has been suggested that the great lady might be the same as Maria Makiling, as her mountain was within the scope of Bay's original territory.

The municipality was first inhabited by settlers led by Datu Gat Pangil. The mission of Fr. Martín de Rada resulted in the conversion of Gat Pangil and his three daughters to the Catholic faith. The town's colloquial name, Bae, an earlier form of Bay, is said to have been derived from the names of his daughters: Basilisa, Angela, and Elena. Over time, the name evolved into the present official name, Bay.

== History ==
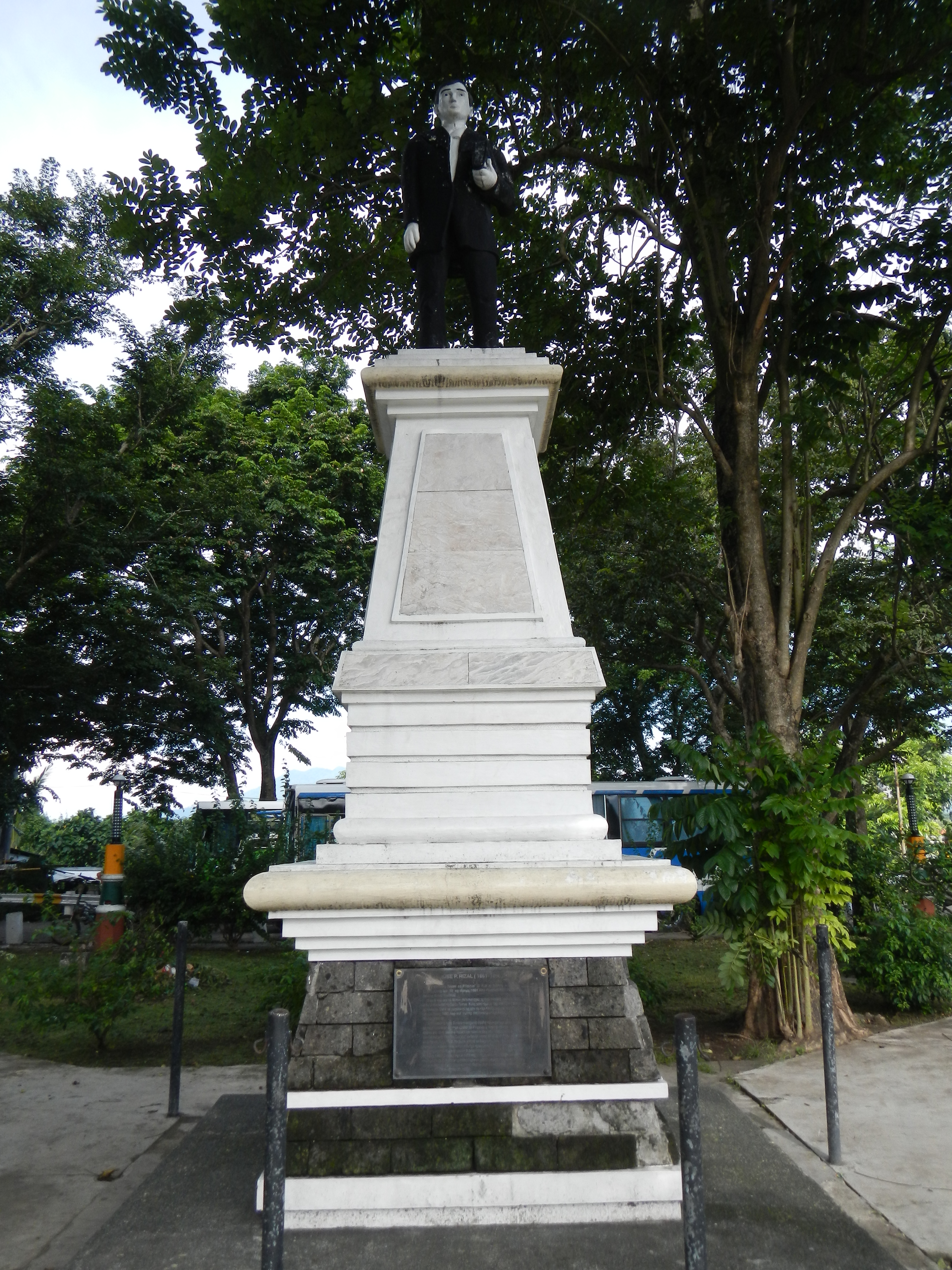
Statue of José Rizal in Dila, between two roads going to neighboring San Pablo and the provincial capital of Santa Cruz

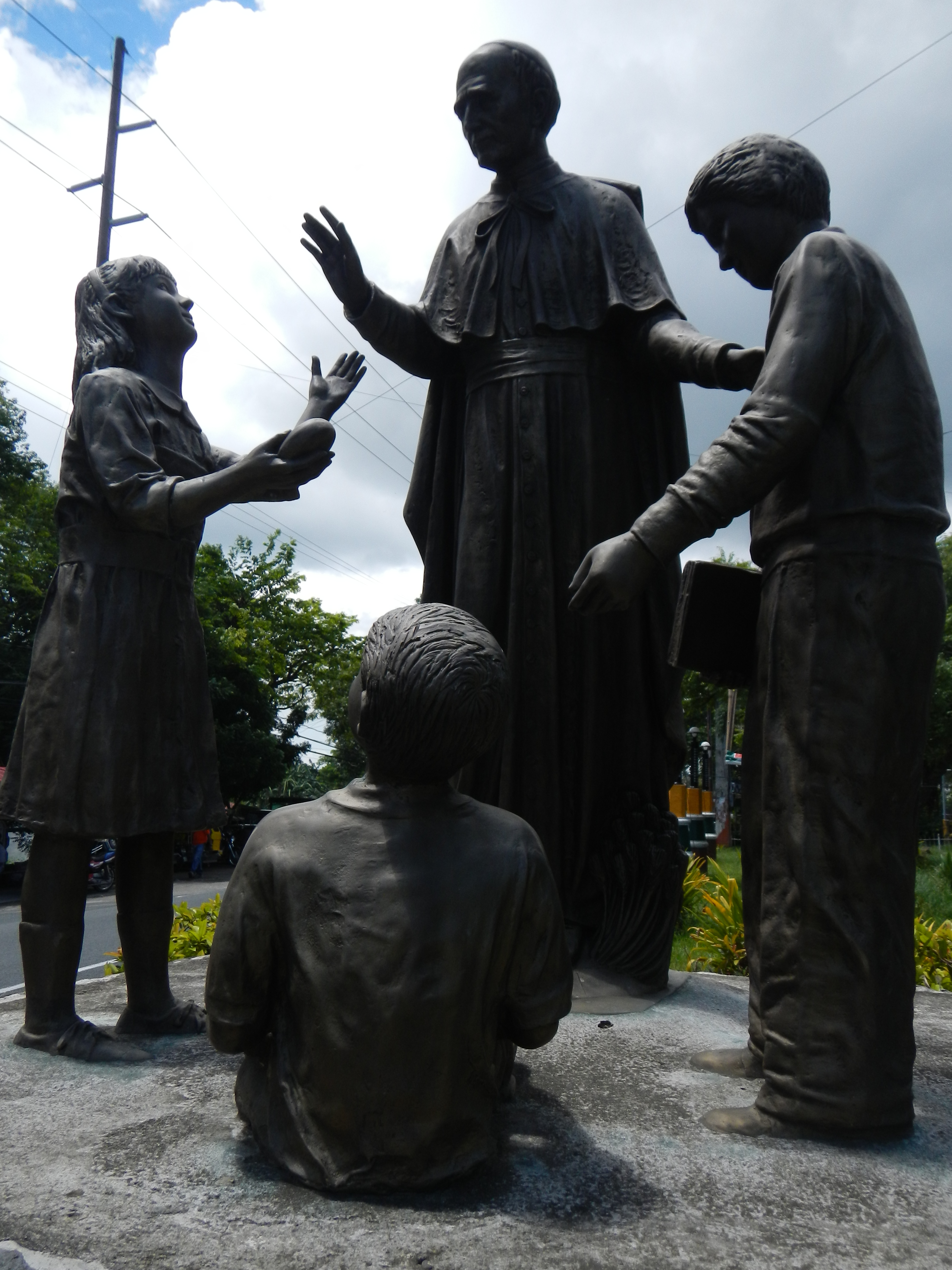
Statue of Saint Annibale Maria di Francia, erected by the Rogationists at Bay Junction

Like much of the Philippine archipelago, the town of Bay has no surviving records from before the arrival of Spanish conquistadors, despite having existed earlier. The earliest recorded account of Bay appears in a document on the conquest of Luzon dated April 20, 1572. It described a large and very deep freshwater lake, about 12 leguas wide, with surrounding villages inhabited by approximately 25,000 people at the time Captain Juan de Salcedo arrived in the area.

Bay is one of the oldest towns in Laguna province and was its first capital. Its original territory covered the areas that are now known as Los Baños, Calauan, Alaminos and San Pablo (in addition to its current territory). The Spaniards pronounced the name of the town "Bah-ee" while the natives called it "Bah-eh." The similarity in spelling has led to the misconception that the town was named after Laguna de Bay, even as the Spaniards named the lake after this ancient Tagalog community.

The "official" recorded history of Bay may be gleaned from the Augustinian Gaspar de San Agustín's Conquistas de las Islas Filipinas (1565-1615) and Fr. Joaquín Mártines de Zúñiga's Status of the Philippine Islands in 1800. Miguel López de Legaspi, after having established the City of Manila on June 24, 1571, ordered the exploration and pacification of the surrounding villages and settlements. Martín de Goiti led a contingent northward to Pampanga, while Juan de Salcedo, Legaspi's 22-year-old grandson, led his own party eastward up the Pasig River towards Laguna de Bay.

With him was Fr. Alonzo Alvarado, an Augustinian very zealous in converting the natives. From what are now Taytay and Cainta, Salcedo proceeded to Bay, Liliw, Nagcarlan, and Majayjay and other towns, where upon Fr. Alvarado's intercession, the natives surrendered peacefully to them with Fray Diego de Espinar and 60 men. He followed the rugged trails of the mountainous village of Sampaloc (now San Pablo) southeast towards the Bicol Region to find gold, which was in mines along the Bicol River in Camarines Sur.

In 1571, Fr. Martín de Rada, superior of the Augustinians who came with the Legazpi expedition in 1565, started to build a bamboo and nipa church under the patronage of Saint Augustine of Hippo, along the lakeshore of Bay in Aplaya (now San Antonio). He became the first parish priest of Bay. On April 30, 1578, Fr. Joaquín de Zúñiga stated in the Historical View of the Philippine Islands that Bay was organized both as a town and a parish with Fr. Juan Gallegos as the parish priest. On the same day, the village of Sampaloc was made a visita of the lakeside village where it was believed that the tribunal of ecclesiastical visitors of Bay was held. San Agustín further wrote that in 1586, the Augustinians organized the visita into a convento with a priest. The provincial Fr. Diego Álvarez handled the administration of Christianized natives, making Sampaloc into San Pablo de los Montes and separate from Bay parish.

The powerful Gat Pangil was datu of this already thriving community in 1571 when Salcedo arrived with Alvarado and Espinar. It was Salcedo who took the name of the town and named the lake after it as Laguna de Bay ("Lake of [the town of] Bay"). Eventually, the Spanish called the whole province "La Provincia de la Laguna de Bay."

In 1581, San Antonio de Bay became the capital of the Province of Laguna de Bay, and remained so until 1688, when the capital was moved to Pagsanjan.

== Geography ==
Bay is situated 20 kilometers (12 mi) from Santa Cruz and 67 kilometers (42 mi) southeast of Manila. It is also located east of Los Baños, west of Calauan, northeast of Santo Tomas and northwest of Alaminos.

=== Climate ===
Climate data for Bay, Laguna
Month	Jan	Feb	Mar	Apr	May	Jun	Jul	Aug	Sep	Oct	Nov	Dec	Year
Mean daily maximum °C (°F)	26 (79)	27 (81)	29 (84)	31 (88)	31 (88)	30 (86)	29 (84)	29 (84)	29 (84)	29 (84)	28 (82)	26 (79)	29 (84)
Mean daily minimum °C (°F)	22 (72)	22 (72)	22 (72)	23 (73)	24 (75)	25 (77)	24 (75)	24 (75)	24 (75)	24 (75)	24 (75)	23 (73)	23 (74)
Average precipitation mm (inches)	58 (2.3)	41 (1.6)	32 (1.3)	29 (1.1)	91 (3.6)	143 (5.6)	181 (7.1)	162 (6.4)	172 (6.8)	164 (6.5)	113 (4.4)	121 (4.8)	1,307 (51.5)
Average rainy days	13.4	9.3	9.1	9.8	19.1	22.9	26.6	24.9	25.0	21.4	16.5	16.5	214.5
Source: Meteoblue

=== Barangays ===
Bay is politically subdivided into 15 barangays, as indicated below. Each barangay consists of puroks and some have sitios.

Barangay map of Bay (barangays highlighted in red are urban)

PSGC	Barangay	Population			±% p.a.	
		2024		2010		
0403402001	Bitin	10.1%	7,059	6,141	▴	0.96%
0403402002	Calo	5.9%	4,105	3,576	▴	0.95%
0403402003	Dila	10.6%	7,384	5,167	▴	2.49%
0403402004	Maitim	7.0%	4,867	4,002	▴	1.36%
0403402005	Masaya	8.8%	6,150	5,136	▴	1.25%
0403402006	Paciano Rizal	6.1%	4,230	3,789	▴	0.76%
0403402009	Puypuy	6.5%	4,558	3,203	▴	2.46%
0403402010	San Antonio	8.3%	5,787	5,583	▴	0.25%
0403402011	San Isidro	4.0%	2,823	2,506	▴	0.82%
0403402012	Santa Cruz	4.1%	2,832	2,439	▴	1.03%
0403402013	Santo Domingo	14.9%	10,404	6,237	▴	3.58%
0403402014	Tagumpay	4.4%	3,078	2,026	▴	2.92%
0403402015	Tranca	5.1%	3,564	3,150	▴	0.85%
0403402016	San Agustin (Poblacion)	2.3%	1,609	1,382	▴	1.05%
0403402017	San Nicolas (Poblacion)	1.9%	1,352	1,361	▾	−0.05%
	Total		69,802	55,698	▴	1.57%

Bitin

Bitin (lit. 'short') is located along the border between Laguna and Batangas. It is known for its contribution to the harnessing of geothermal energy as a source of electricity in the Philippines, being the site of the Mak–Ban Geothermal Power Plant.

Calo

Barangay Calo was formed in the Spanish era, where the native Filipinos lived in the jungle. The area is known for its abundance of kalaw (Philippine hornbill, Buceros hydrocorax), which the Spanish transcribed as "calo".

Dila

Its name came from Tagalog word "dilà" (lit. 'tongue') as it looks like a tongue if viewed on a map of Bay. It is the easternmost part of the town.

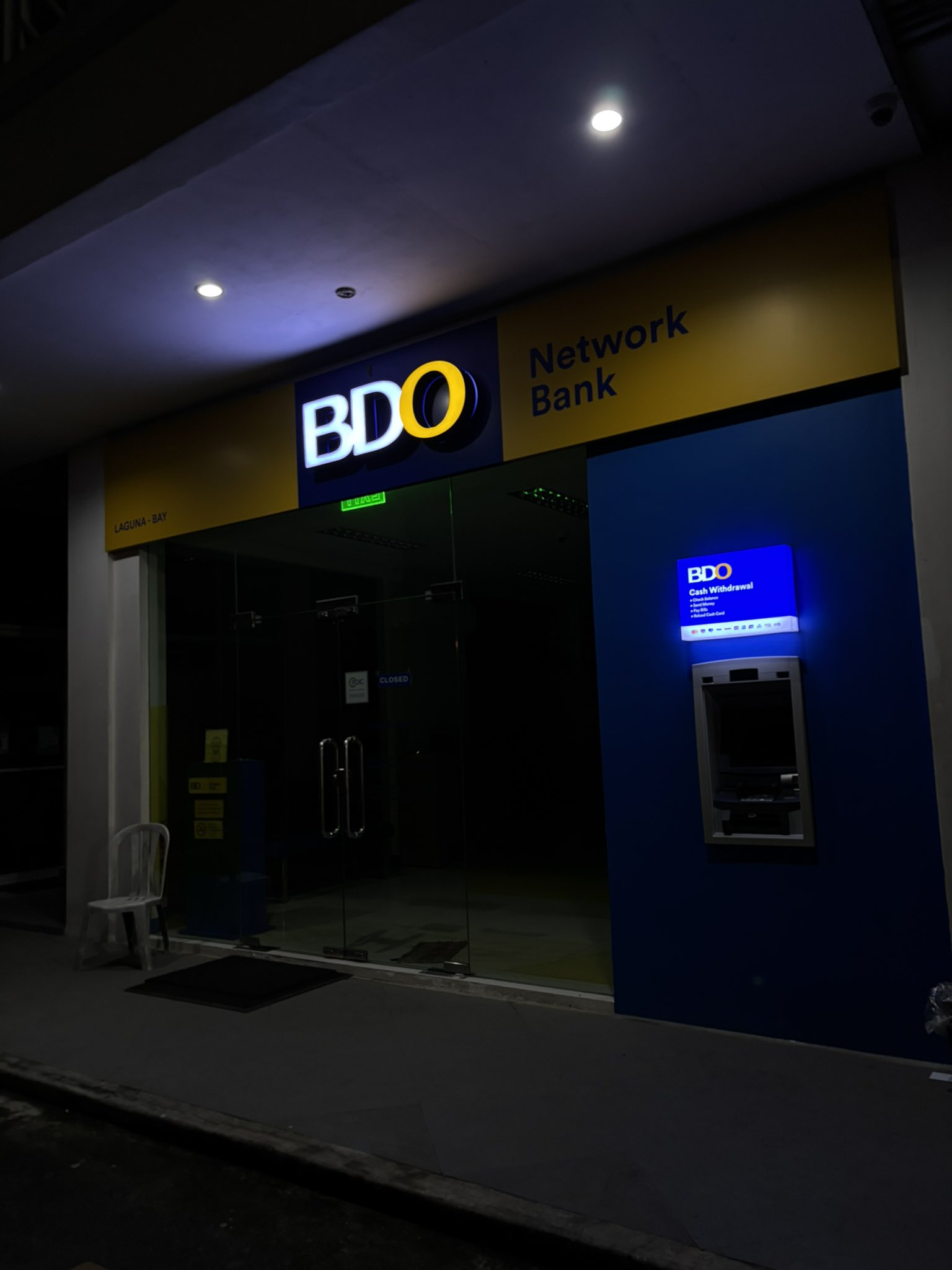
A BDO Network Bank branch in Dila, captured at night

Maitim

The name from the Spanish colonial era refers to the area's dark soil, hence people calling it "maitím" (lit. 'black'). Another folk etymology is that the area was a forest burnt black in a fire, with only charred wood and ashes left.

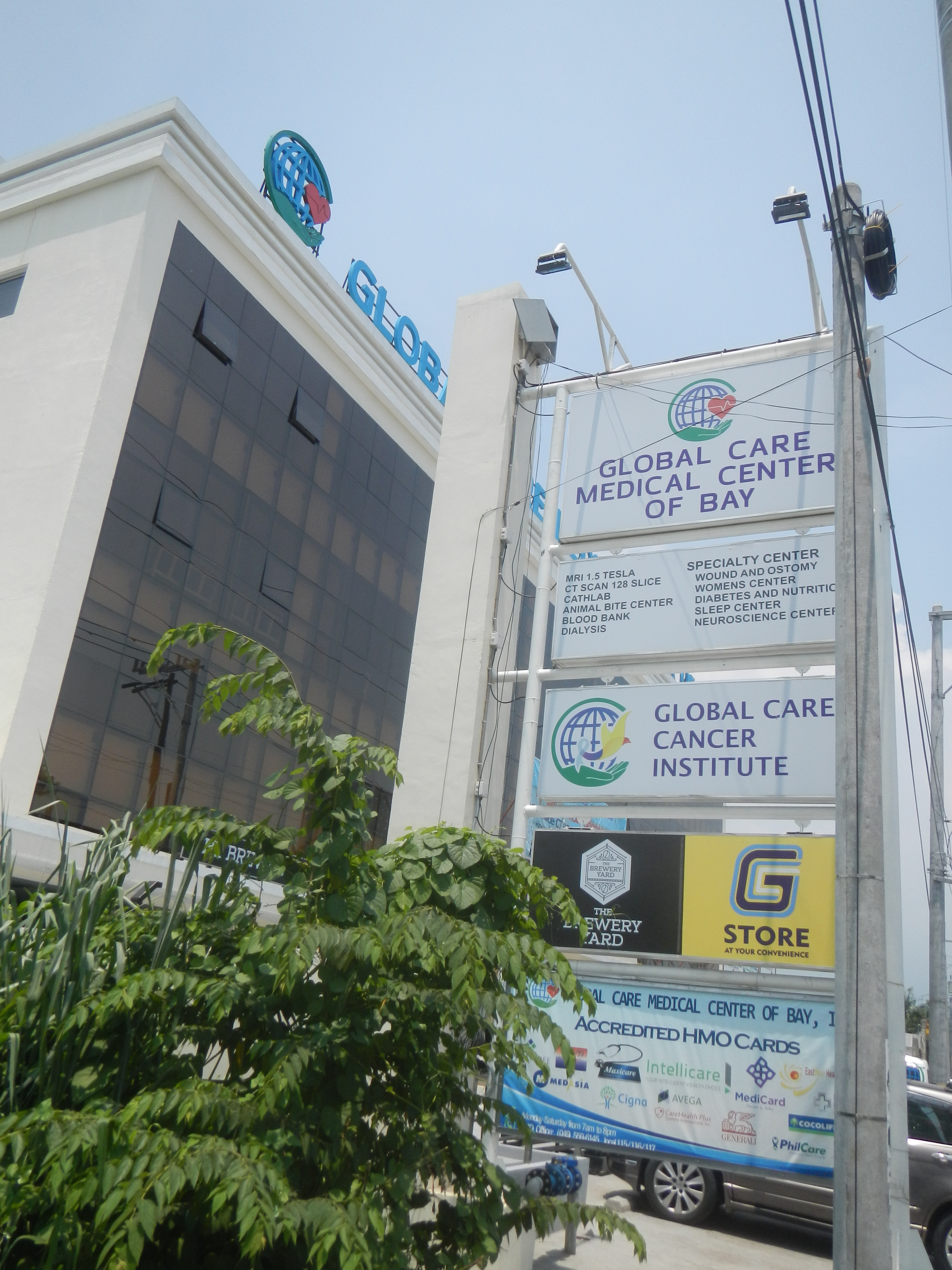
Global Care Medical Center in Maitim

Masaya

The barangay's name masayá means "happy". The upper part from the railway was part of Tranca, while the lower part towards town was part of Puypuy. When the railway was built in the early 20th century, a train station was built there, making it a commercial center for the five barangays of upland Bay. Grocery stores, dress shops, hardware stores and sari-sari stores sprouted around the train station, and the festive air had those leaving home for the place to say they were heading "doón sa masayá" (lit. 'where it is happy').

Paciano Rizal

Formerly known as Mainit (lit. 'hot'), and renamed after Paciano Rizal, the eldest brother of national hero Dr. José Rizal, who was said to have owned and lived on a farm in this barangay.

Puypuy

It was said a big meteor once fell in the area and natives reported a falling "fire" (Tagalog: apóy), which the Spaniards mispronounced as "puypuy".

In 2010, a team of experts unearthed precolonial jars in the Barangay. University of the Philippines Los Baños anthropologist and marine biologist Dr. Bonifacio Comandante, Jr, who led the team, suggested the objects indicate "there was a community here and they used the pots and jars for jar-burial", highly suggesting human habitation of the area as early as circa 800 B.C.

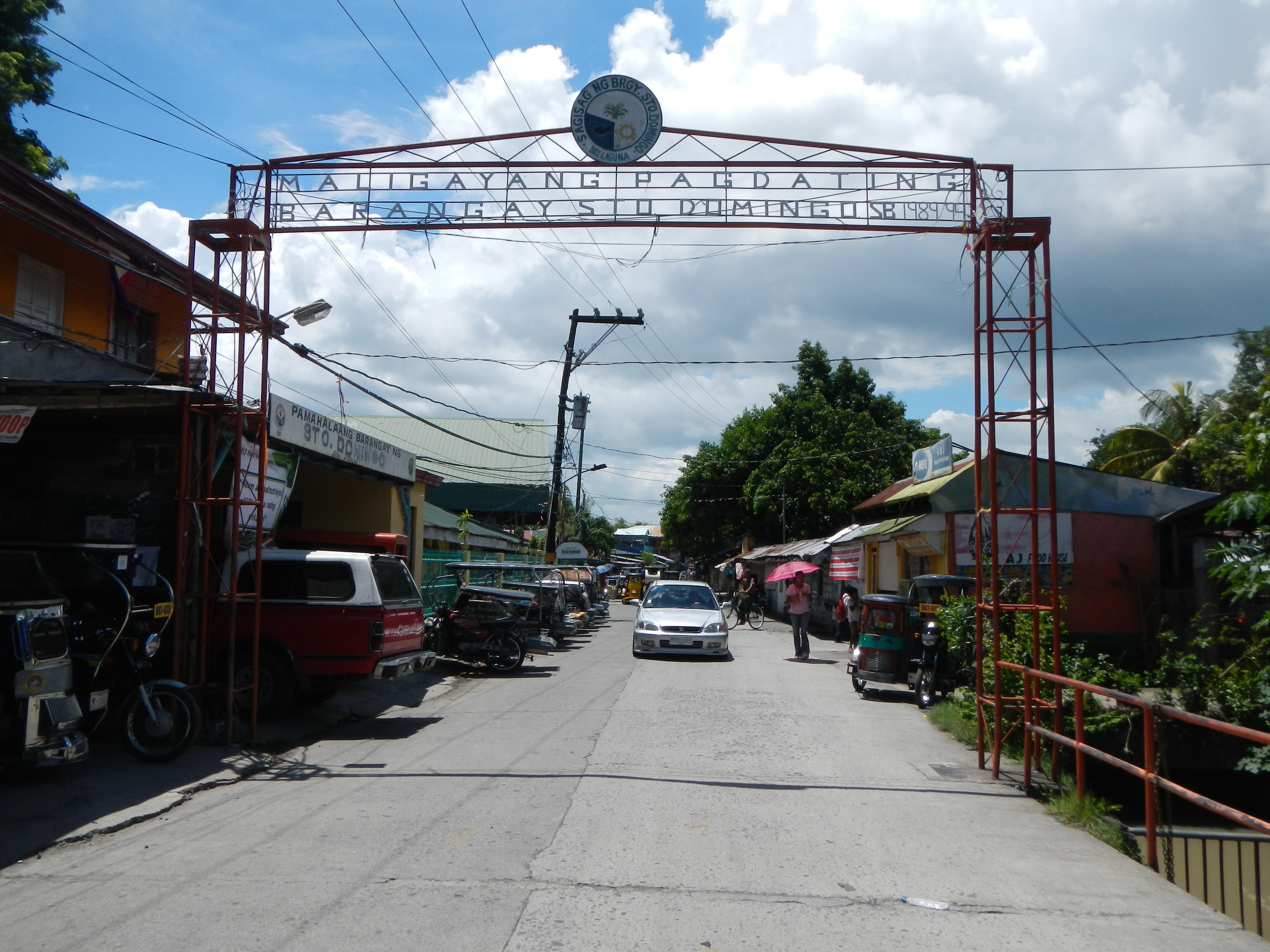
Arch of Santo Domingo, one of the barangays in Bay. Santo Domingo was once part of the later Barangay Mainit (now Los Baños).

San Antonio

Named after St. Anthony of Padua, it is where the original and first church of the town was situated. Folklore holds that the church was submerged by Laguna de Bay when a super typhoon caused severe floods. The village celebrates the saint's feast day on June 13.

San Isidro

Named after St. Isidore the Laborer, the patron of farmworkers known for his piety toward the poor and animals. His feast day is on May 15.

Santa Cruz

Named after the Holy Cross.

Santo Domingo

Name after Saint Dominic Guzmán and Don Domingo Ordoveza, who once owned a large part of what was then sitio Tabon. The name was given by Donato Ople, a longtime school principal in the town.

The town holds two fiestas: one for its patron saint, Isidore the Labourer, on his feast of May 15; as well as its foundation day and Tilapia Festival to celebrate the local tilapia industry.

It has one of the fast-growing economies in Bay as it has commercial buildings and subdivisions. It is also site of the first mall in the municipality, CityMall Bay.

San Agustín (Población)

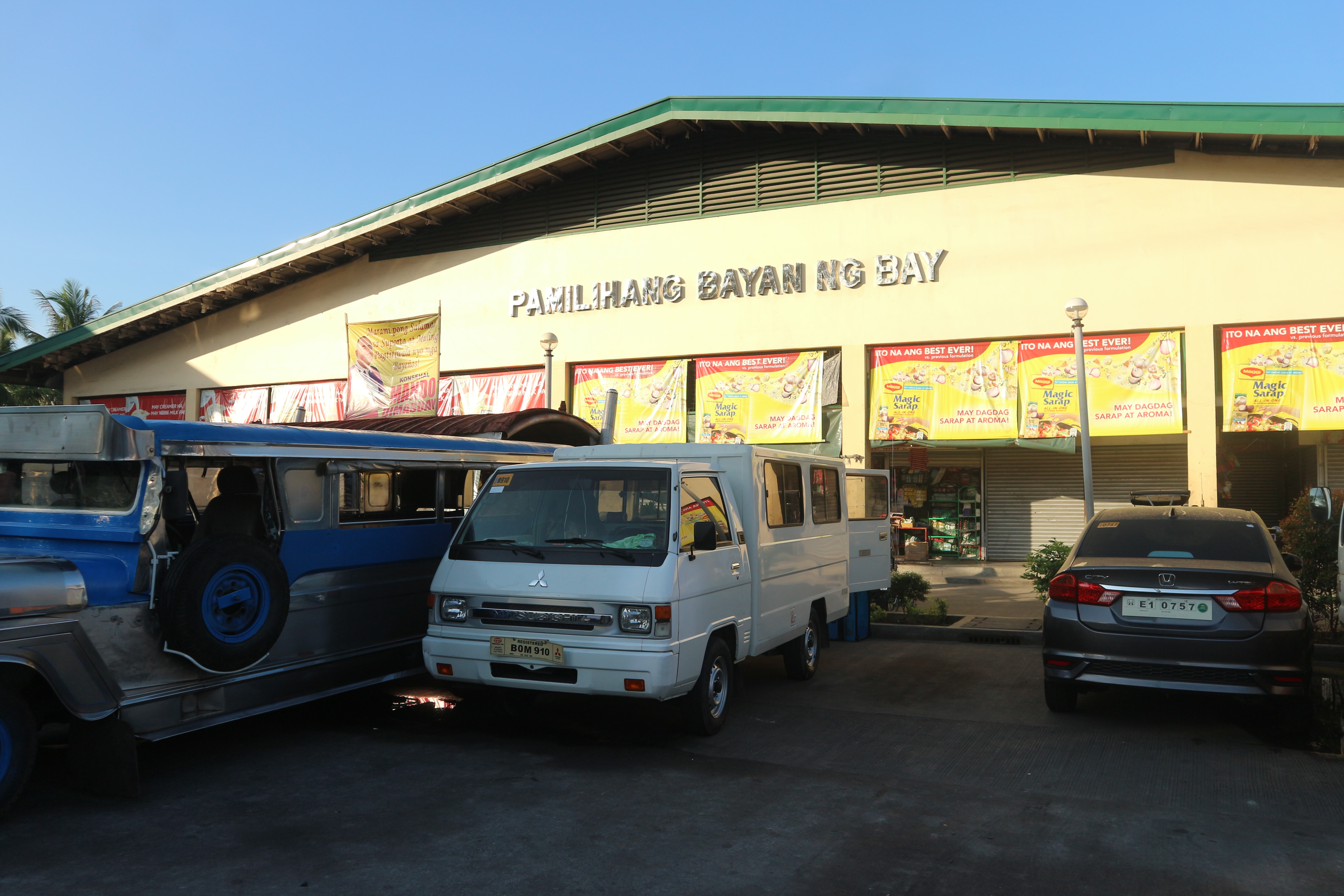
Bay Public Market

Named after the town's patron, Saint Augustine of Hippo, it is one of the barangays that make up the town proper. It is the location of the Saint Augustine of Hippo Parish, the Municipal Hall, and is among the busiest barangays given its convenience stores. It is near the town's new public market, "Pamilihang Bayan ng Bay".

It is the home of the Tenorio's Bakery, widely famous for their Monay Bay (also Monay Bae).

San Nicolás (Población)

Named after Saint Nicholas of Tolentino, it is one of the barangays that make up the town proper.

Tagumpay

Located along the shores of Laguna de Bay, the barangay was formerly part of San Antonio. Tagumpay is one of the barangays in town which does not have a school that offers secondary education. It retains the same patron saint as San Antonio, Saint Anthony of Padua.

Tranca

The population of Tranca grew from 2,017 in 1990 to 3,388 in 2020, an increase of 1,371 people over the course of 30 years. The latest census figures in 2020 denote a positive growth rate of 0.19%, or an increase of 30 people, from the previous population of 3,358 in 2015.

== Demographics ==
Population census of Bay
Year	Pop.	±% p.a.
1903	2,577	—
1918	3,973	+2.93%
1939	6,703	+2.52%
1948	7,395	+1.10%
1960	11,416	+3.68%
1970	16,881	+3.98%
1975	19,363	+2.79%
1980	22,960	+3.47%
1990	32,535	+3.55%
1995	37,563	+2.73%
2000	43,762	+3.33%
2007	50,756	+2.07%
2010	55,698	+3.44%
2015	62,143	+2.11%
2020	67,182	+1.65%
2024	69,802	+0.92%
Source: Philippine Statistics Authority

In the 2024 census, the population of Bay, Laguna, was 69,802 people, with a density of 1,600 inhabitants per square kilometer or 4,100 inhabitants per square mile. Voter population as of 2016 is estimated to be 34,195, according to the COMELEC.

== Economy ==
Poverty incidence of Bay (%)

Source: Philippine Statistics Authority

== Government ==
=== Local government ===
Like other local government units in Laguna, the town of Bay holds elections every three years.

Members of Bay Council (2022–2025)
Position	Name	Party
Mayor	Jose O. Padrid	PDP–Laban
Vice Mayor	John Paul C. Villegas	Independent
Councilors	Chester Myron N. Ramos	PDP–Laban
Councilors	Julian Rod R. Padrid	PDP–Laban
Councilors	Rommel B. Ilagan	Independent
Councilors	Amando K. Dimasuay	PDP–Laban
Councilors	Kier Melvin F. Ebron	Independent
Councilors	Cesar D. Comia	UNIDO
Councilors	Anthony Collioni J. Sanchez	Aksyon
Councilors	Amado M. Ramos Jr.	Independent

During the 2025 elections, Jose Padrid won his third and last term. But on April 5, 2026, Easter Sunday, he suddenly passed away at age 68. After his death, the council changed its leadership.

Members of Bay Council (2026–2028)
Position	Name	Party
Mayor	Michael "Dabang" Punzalan	Lakas
Vice Mayor	Julian Rod "Kiko" Padrid	Lakas
Councilors	Rommel Ilagan	Independent
Councilors	Dan Wesson Dimasuay	Lakas
Councilors	Cesar Comia	UNIDO
Councilors	Joselito "Pepsie" Gutierrez	AKAY
Councilors	Angelito "Itok" De Mesa	Independent
Councilors	Ryan Villegas	Independent
Councilors	Emerson Ilagan	Lakas
Councilors	Estelito Malagno	Lakas

== Infrastructure ==
=== Healthcare ===
Currently, Bay Laguna has two functioning hospitals: LPH Bay District Hospital and Global Care Medical Center, both in Barangay Maitim. The municipality has a free Chemotherapy Center in the district hospital, and a Cancer Institute in Global. In the future, the Laguna Regional Hospital is set to rise, becoming the first government-run Level 3 hospital in Laguna. In 2024, Former Congresswoman Ruth Hernandez announced a PHP150 million initial budget for its construction. Additionally, a municipal health center could be found in Barangay San Nicolas along the J.P. Rizal Avenue near the San Agustin Parish Church.

=== Municipal Administration ===
The municipal government of Bay, Laguna is currently in the Joaquin Chipeco Jr. Building behind the old municipal hall. In 2022, the new site had its groundbreaking ceremony.

=== Police ===
The Municipal Police Station is also located on the ground floor of the Joaquin Chipeco Jr. Building. There is also a police checkpoint at Calamba-Pagsanjan Road in Barangay Puypuy. The 1st Laguna Provincial Mobile Force Company is located in Barangay Bitin.

=== Fisheries ===
The Bureau of Fisheries and Aquatic Resources (BFAR) Region 4A has a Freshwater Demonstration Fish Farm located in Barangay Santo Domingo, which provides livelihood assistance through dispersal of tilapia and ornamental fish fingerlings to marginal fisherfolk and communal seeding. The municipality has a Community Fish Landing Center in Barangay San Antonio.

== Transportation ==
=== Bus ===
Bus routes going to and from Santa Cruz, Calamba, and Metro Manila are accessible to the public. Buses can be hailed at designated bus stops and/or waiting sheds within the municipality. Section 1, Article 2 of Municipal Ordinance 23-2022, which regulates the passage of transport vehicles, states that "All Public Bus Transport must pass along RP-Japan National Highway from Five o'clock in the morning (5:00 AM) until Seven o'clock in the evening (7:00 PM) and to pass along Jose P. Rizal Avenue from Seven o'clock in the evening (7:00 PM) until 5 o'clock in the morning (5:00 AM)."

=== Jeepney ===
Jeepneys going to and from Calamba, Santa Cruz, and San Pablo can be hailed along the Pan-Philippine Highway, except on the stretch starting from the Brgy. Dila Junction all the way to Brgy. Maitim Junction, where jeepney routes utilize J.P. Rizal Avenue as stated in Section 1, Article 2 of Municipal Ordinance No. 23-2022. These jeepneys can be hailed at any time of the day, although the frequency of trips going through Bay experiences a significant drop at nighttime.

The SNODLOB TS-MPC Jubileeville-UPLB Route is a recently established electronic jeepney route launched by the University of the Philippines Los Baños in partnership with the Municipal Government of Los Baños and the Samahan ng Nagkakaisang Drivers at Operators ng Los Baños (SNODLOB) Transport Service and Multi-purpose Cooperative. The route connects Brgy. Paciano Rizal in Bay to UPLB, with trips available from 5 AM to 8 PM.

=== Tricycle ===
Tricycle services can be hired at terminals located in front of the public market or at the terminals near local schools. Rides can also be hailed along public roads with roaming tricycles. Special trips can also be commissioned if necessary. The guidelines for regular and special trips can be accessed through the fare matrix attached inside each licensed tricycle.

== Economy ==
=== Flower Industry ===
Bay Laguna is famously known for the thriving landscape industries and flower cultivation, having the title "Garden Capital of Laguna". The main branch of "Gintong Talulot" is located in the municipality. Most of the flower industries are located along the highway or in Barangay Puypuy.

=== Fishery ===
In the northern part of the municipality, the main industry is Aquaculture and Fishing. In Santo Domingo, a tilapia fingerling nursery is a thriving industry.

=== Agriculture ===
In Barangays Puypuy, Santo Domingo, Maitim, and Calo, farming is a livelihood which thrives within the municipality. In Barangay San Isidro, the rabbit industry is emerging. The Metro Pacific Dairy Farm is located in Barangay Masaya. While in the southern part of the municipality, people living in the woods are selling fruits along the road of F.T. San Luis Avenue.

=== Commercial ===
In its modern history, the municipal economy grew due to the continuous establishment of commercial businesses in key locations with good consumer exposure such as in the Brgy. Sto. Domingo to Brgy. Maitim highway section, within the streets of Jose Rizal Avenue, and Brgy. Dila—specifically around the Dila Intersection. Local grocery stores, convenience store franchises such as 7-Eleven and Dali Everyday Grocery can be located throughout the municipality. Fast food chains such as Jollibee, McDonald's, and KFC can also be found along the national highway. The Citymall Bay Branch is a shopping mall that is still under construction.

== Tourism ==
=== Fiesta Bayeña ===
With the help of the flower industry, aquaculture, and agriculture, the people within the municipality celebrate "Fiesta Bayeña" as a thanksgiving, which is celebrated on August 28, in honor of the patron of the town, St. Augustine of Hippo.

=== San Agustin Church ===
The Saint Augustine of Hippo Parish Church, commonly known as Bay Church, is the oldest church in Bay Laguna, dating back to 1571 firstly built near the shore but was relocated due to flooding. The church was heavily damaged during World War 2, but was able to be rebuilt after the war. During the 500 Years of Christianity in the Philippines and 2025 Jubilee, the church was designated as a Jubilee Church.

=== Waggish Baywalk ===
The Waggish Baywalk is famously known as a place to hang out with a scenic view of Laguna de Bay and numerous street food vendors.

=== Tenorio's Bakery ===
Tenorio's Bakery is the home of the famous "Monay Bae" located on the main street of Barangay San Agustin. The bread is famously known for its raisins.

=== Kamayan @ Palaisdaan Restohotel ===
The Kamayan @ Palaisdaan Restohotel, or commonly known as Kamayan, is a famous floating restaurant with good ambience that has a popular signature dish, "Sinugno".

== Education ==
The Bay Schools District Office directly governs all public educational institutions whilst exerting supervisory regulation on private educational institutions within the municipality. It oversees the management and operations of all private and public schools from the primary to the secondary levels. The district consists of 24 elementary schools, 9 high schools, and 2 higher educational institutions. Separately, the University of the Philippines Rural High School (UPRHS) operates under the UP System and is regulated by neither DepEd nor CHED.

=== Primary and elementary schools ===
- Bay Central School (Brgy. Dila)
- Bitin Elementary School (Brgy. Bitin)
- Calo Elementary School (Brgy. Calo)
- Diamond Learning Center (Brgy. Masaya)
- Escuela de Brigada Montessori (Brgy. San Agustin)
- Fr. Angelico Lipani School (Brgy. Masaya)
- Jehovah Shammah Christian Community School - Main (Brgy. San Nicolas)
- Jehovah Shammah Christian Community School - Annex (Brgy. San Nicolas)
- Jehovah Shammah Christian Community School - Punzalan St. (Brgy. San Nicolas)
- Kabaritan Elementary School (Brgy. Sto. Domingo)
- Maitim Elementary School (Brgy. Maitim)
- Maranatha Christian Academy (Brgy. Calo)
- Masaya Elementary School (Brgy. Masaya)
- Morning Star Montessori School Inc. (Brgy. Sto. Domingo)
- Paciano Rizal Elementary School (Brgy. Paciano Rizal)
- Puypuy Elementary School (Brgy. Puypuy)
- Saint James Christian Learning Center (Brgy. San Antonio)
- San Antonio Elementary School (Brgy. San Antonio)
- San Isidro Elementary School (Brgy. San Isidro)
- Sta. Cruz Elementary School (Brgy. Sta. Cruz)
- Sto. Domingo Elementary School (Brgy. Sto. Domingo)
- Tagumpay Elementary School (Brgy. Tagumpay)
- Tranca Elementary School (Brgy. Tranca)

=== Secondary schools ===
- Bitin Integrated National High School (Brgy. Bitin)
- CARD-MRI Development Institute (Brgy. Tranca)
- CITI GLOBAL COLLEGE-Bay Campus (Brgy. San Agustin)
- Liceo de Bay (Brgy. San Agustin)
- Maquiling School Inc. (Brgy. Puypuy)
- Maranatha Christian Academy (Brgy. Calo)
- Masaya Integrated National High School (Brgy. Masaya)
- Nicolas L. Galvez Memorial Integrated National High School (Brgy. San Antonio)
- Laguna Science Integrated National High School (Brgy. Puypuy)
- University of the Philippines Rural High School (Brgy. Paciano Rizal)

=== Higher educational institutions ===
- CARD-MRI Development Institute (Brgy. Tranca)
- Science and Technology School of Los Baños (Brgy. Paciano Rizal)

First	Capital of Laguna; 1581–1688	Succeeded by Pagsanjan
