= City Mall =

City Mall may refer to:

- City Mall (Central America), three malls operated by Lady Lee in Costa Rica and Honduras
- City Mall, Christchurch, a mall in Christchurch, New Zealand
- City Mall (Amman), a mall in Jordan
- City Mall, Lagos, a mall in Lagos Island, Nigeria
- City Mall (Bucharest), a mall in Romania
- CityMall (Philippines), a chain of malls in the Philippines
- Kumasi City Mall, a mall in Kumasi, Ghana
