= Mak–Ban Geothermal Power Plant =

Geothermal power station complex in Laguna and Batangas, Philippines

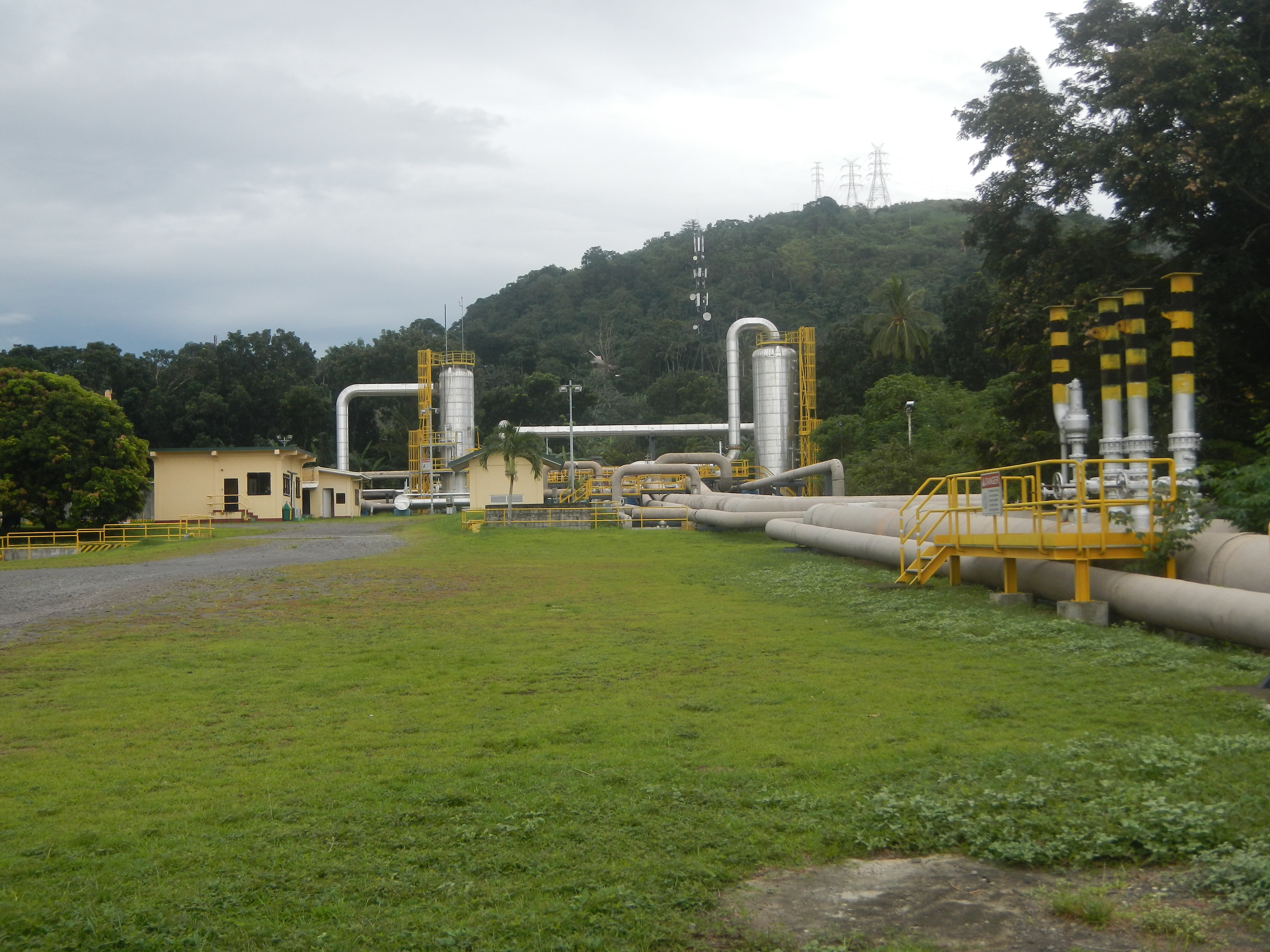
- A binary station, one of the facilities in the geothermal power station complex
- Country: Philippines
- Location: Bay, Laguna and Santo Tomas, Batangas
- Coordinates: 14°05′28.4″N 121°13′06.9″E
- Status: Operational
- Commission date: 1979
- Owner: AP Renewables
- Operator: AP Renewables

Power generation
- Nameplate capacity: 458 MW

The Makiling–Banahaw (Mak–Ban) Geothermal Power Plant is a 458-MW geothermal power station complex in Laguna and Batangas, Philippines.

The facility and the geothermal field are named after Makiling and Banahaw mountains.

== History ==
The Makiling–Banahaw (Mak–Ban) Geothermal Power Plant was developed to harness the geothermal resources of the Mak–Ban or Bulalo field. The Chevron Geothermal Philippine Holdings, Inc., under a service contract with the state-owned National Power Corporation (NPC) commissioned the geothermal station field in 1979. The Mak–Ban facility was developed after the Tiwi facility in Albay which first became operational in the same year.

In 2005, The Philippine government decided to sell the Mak—Ban facility to private investors through the state-owned Power Sector Assets & Liabilities Management Corp. (PSALM). Due to changes in the bidding procedures, the geothermal station was not sold until 2008. Aboitiz Power, through their subsidiary AP Renewables Inc., took over the plant in 2009.

== Facilities ==
The Mak-Ban Geothermal Power Plant has a capacity of 458-MW.
