= San Agustin Parish Church (Bay, Laguna) =

Roman Catholic church in Laguna, Philippines

Bay Church
- Saint Augustine Parish Church
- Simbahan at Parokya ni San Agustin (Filipino)
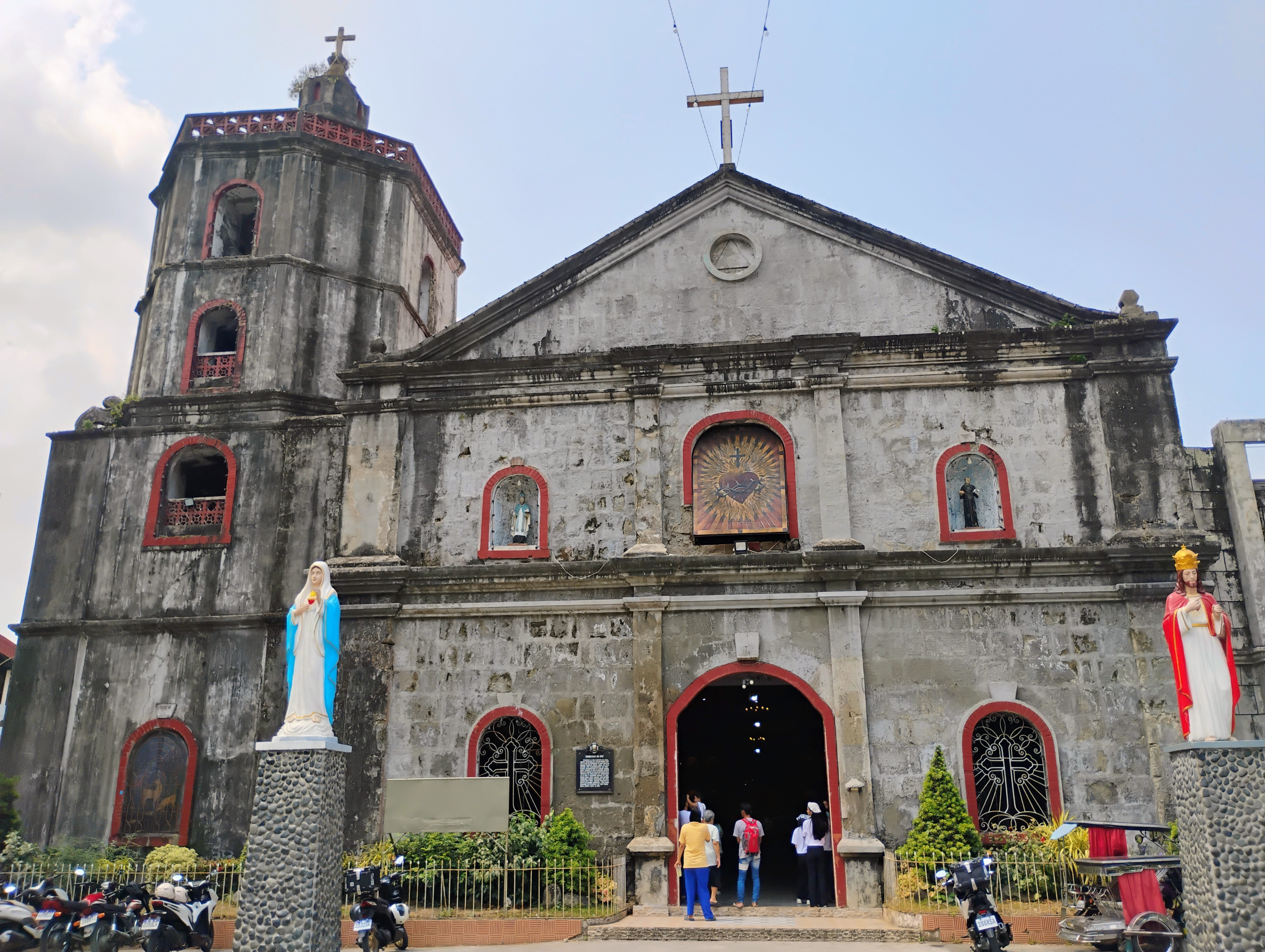
- Church facade in 2026

- Location in Laguna Location in Luzon Location in the Philippines
- 14°10′49″N 121°17′04″E
- Location: Bay, Laguna
- Country: Philippines
- Denomination: Roman Catholic

History
- Former name: Iglesia y Convento de Bay
- Status: Parish church
- Founded: 1571
- Founder: Martin de Rada
- Dedication: Augustine of Hippo
- Consecrated: 1580 (as Parish)

Architecture
- Functional status: Active
- Heritage designation: Iglesia y Convento de Bay
- Designated: 1572
- Architectural type: Church building
- Style: Colonial Baroque
- Groundbreaking: 1572
- Completed: 1737

Specifications
- Materials: Bricks, gravel, limestone

Administration
- Province: Manila
- Archdiocese: Manila
- Diocese: San Pablo
- Deanery: Immaculate Conception

Clergy
- Priest: Licerio S. Taguilaso

Saint Augustine Parish Church is the only Augustinian Roman Catholic church in Bay, Laguna, in the Philippines. It is under the jurisdiction of the Diocese of San Pablo. The church was first administered by Augustinian friars and later transferred to the Franciscans.

== History ==
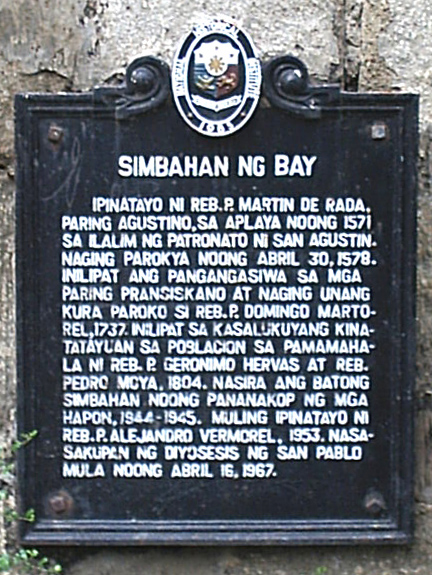
Church NHI historical marker installed in 1985

San Agustin Parish Church is historically considered as the oldest Roman Catholic church in the Province of Laguna upon the early conquest and establishment of La Laguna.

The first church of Bay was constructed made of light material of bamboo and nipa by the first-ever Catholic missionaries in Laguna, the Augustinian friars of Provincia del Santisimo Nombre de Jesus. It was built along the shore of Laguna Lake (now Brgy. San Agustin.) The town church itself was under supervision of prior provincial itself no other than Martin de Rada (de Herada in some documents) under the patronage of the order's major patron saint, Augustine of Hippo, in 1571. It became a parish on April 30, 1578. In the 18th century, the ecclesiastical administration of Bay was transferred to the Order of Franciscan Minors (OFM), with Domingo Martorel as its new parish priest on November 23, 1737. From the original site along the lake, the church was transferred to its present site later known as poblacion, or town center. In 1804, a structure made of bricks and wood was built under the supervision of Geronimo Hervas. Construction of the church continued until the tenure of Pedro Moya in 1864.

When the most devastating earthquakes in the Philippines struck in 1880, the Luzon earthquake, the church suffered some damage, including to the church's roof. The earthquake also led to a number of fatalities among the townspeople.

When the regular clergy (missionaries) abandoned the Philippines in 1898–1899 due to the Philippine Revolution against Spain and in 1899-1903 due to the Philippine–American War, the Bay church and convent were administered by the secular clergy of the Archdiocese of Manila. The church was also heavily damaged during the Japanese occupation of the Philippines and the Second World War from 1942 to 1945. When peacetime came in 1953, the church was gradually rebuilt by Alejandro Vermorel. When the Archdiocese of Lipa was created, the church was transferred to the newly created archdiocese as of April 16, 1967. In 1980s the canonical administration of Bay Church was again transferred to the newly created Diocese of San Pablo.

== Gallery ==
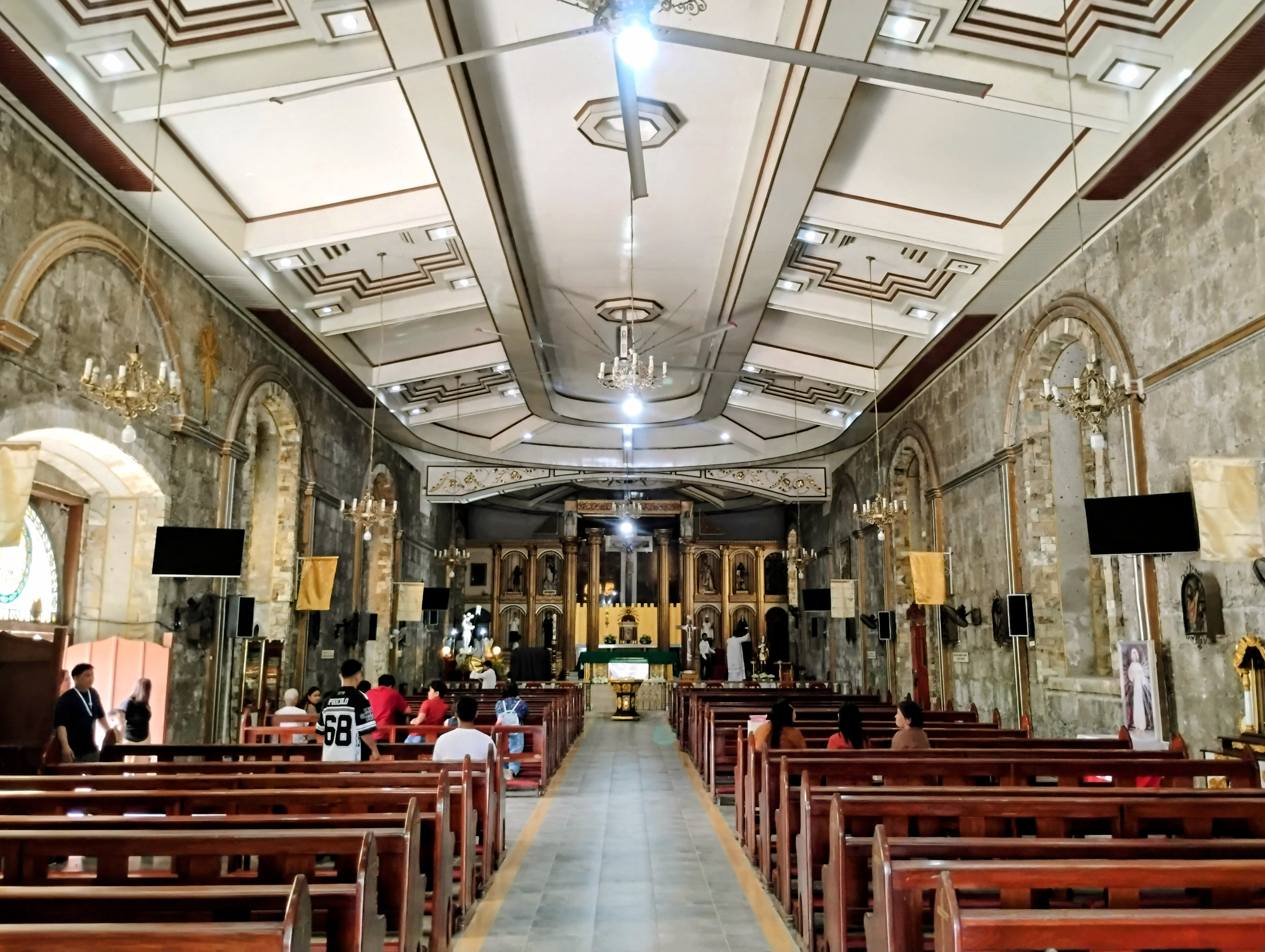
Church interior in 2026

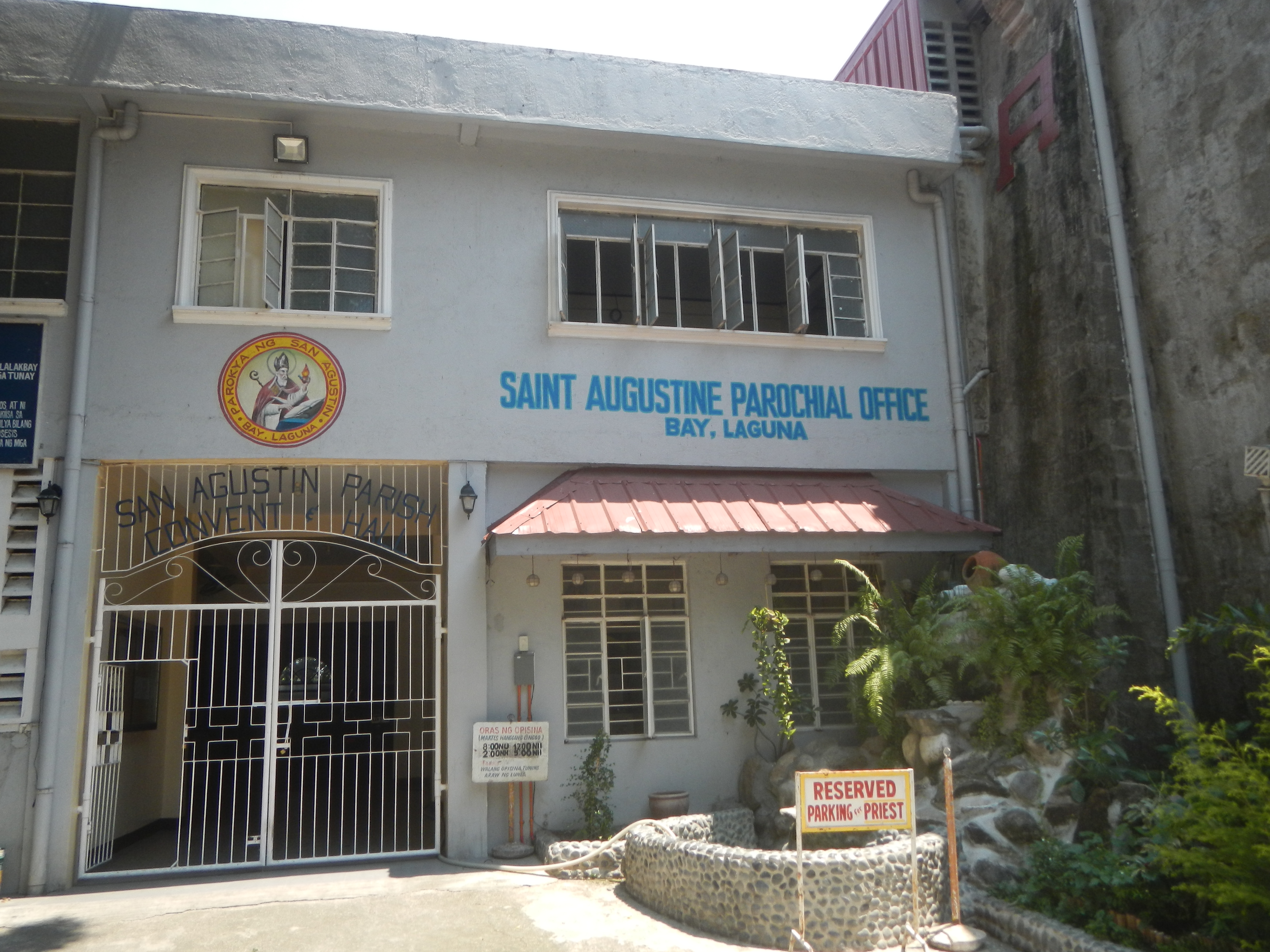
Parochial office

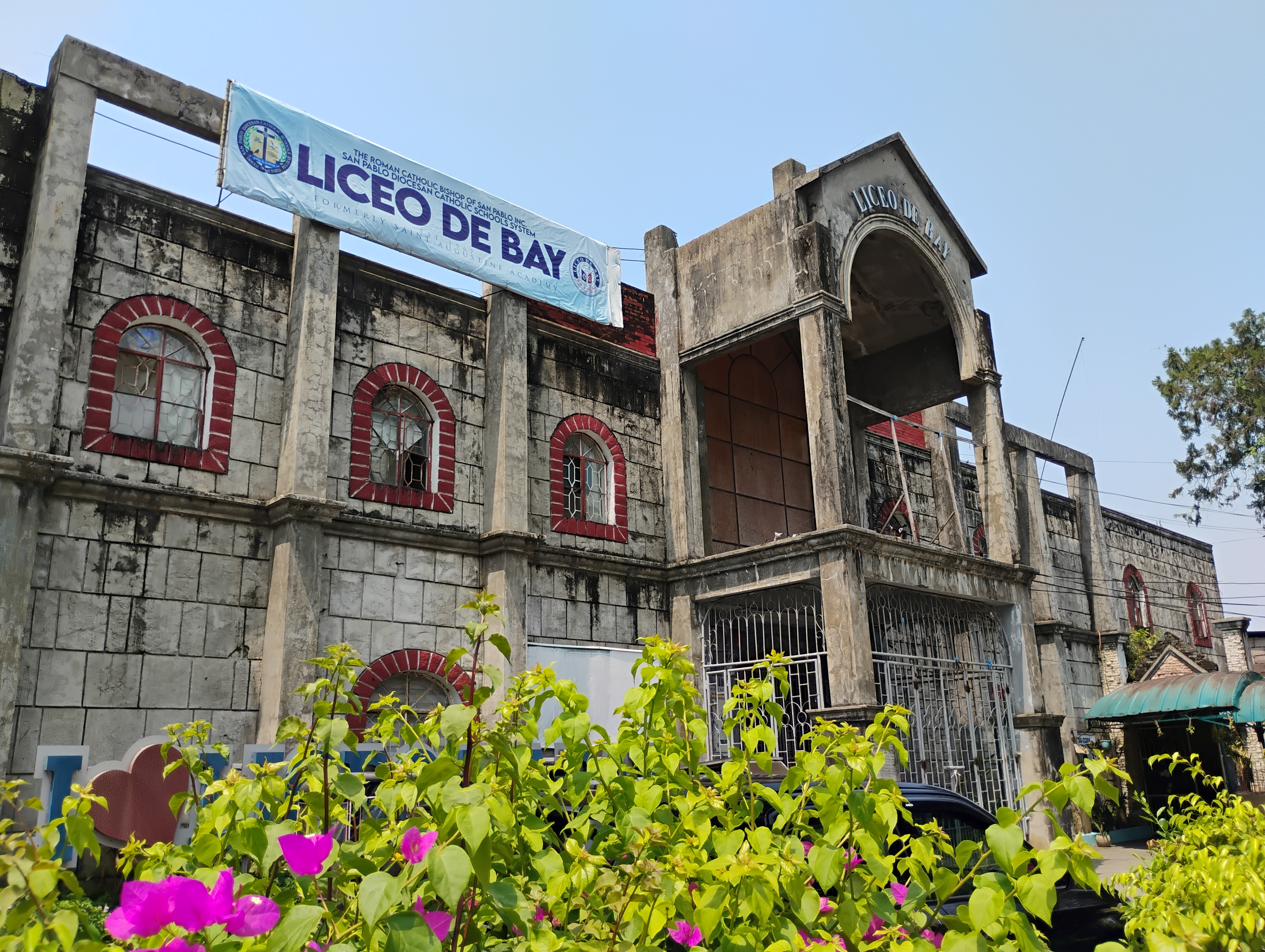
Liceo de Bay

== Bibliography ==
- Huerta, Felix de (1865). Estado geográfico, topográfico, estadístico, histórico-religioso. Binondo: Imprenta de M. Sanchez y Ca.
- Historical Markers: Regions I–IV and CAR. Manila: National Historical Institute (Philippines). 1993. p. 42. ISBN 9715380611.
