= Cancer Institute =

Cancer Institute may refer to one of the following organisations:

== Australia ==
- Australian Cancer Council
- Cancer Institute of New South Wales
- Peter MacCallum Cancer Centre

== Other countries ==
- European Organisation for Research and Treatment of Cancer (EORTC)
- Adyar Cancer Institute, India
- National Cancer Institute, United States
