= City Mall (Central America) =

Three malls in Central America

City Mall is the name of three malls operated by Corporación Lady Lee in Alajuela, Costa Rica, and in San Pedro Sula and Tegucigalpa, Honduras.

City Mall Alajuela opened in 2014, it has 365 stores, it is the biggest shopping mall in Central America, and its visited by almost 10 million people in the year. 800,000 per month

City Mall Tegucigalpa opened in September 2012. It has a total area of 130,000 square meters, 280 shops, 25 restaurants, and parking for 1,500 cars.
