= Laguna's at-large congressional district =

At-large Philippine legislative district for Laguna

- Former constituency for the Malolos Congress, National Assembly of the Philippines and Batasang Pambansa
- Province: Laguna
- Region: Southern Tagalog (1984–1986)

Former constituency
- Created: 1898 (first creation); 1943 (second creation); 1984 (third creation)
- Abolished: 1907 (first abolition); 1945 (second abolition); 1986 (third abolition)

Laguna's at-large congressional district may refer to three occasions when a provincewide at-large district was used for elections to the various Philippine national legislatures representing Laguna.

From 1898 to 1901, four representatives from the province who were elected at-large sat in the Malolos Congress, the national assembly of the First Philippine Republic. Laguna was reorganized under the Philippine Insular Government in 1901 and was divided into two districts for the Philippine Assembly in 1907. From 1943 to 1944, the province as a whole sent two representatives to the national assembly during the Second Republic. Multiple-district representation was restored in the province in 1945.

In 1978, regional at-large assembly districts were created for the Interim Batasang Pambansa, the national parliament, with Laguna included in the 20-seat Region IV-A at-large district. The province returned to its own single, multi-member at-large district in 1984, with a four-seat delegation to the Regular Batasang Pambansa during the Fourth Republic. After 1986, Laguna elected its representatives from its separate congressional districts. The district was last represented by Arturo Brion, Wenceslao Lagumbay, and Luis Yulo of Kilusang Bagong Lipunan (KBL) and Rustico delos Reyes Jr. of the local party Pangmasang Samahan sa Laguna (PSL).

== List of members representing the district ==
=== Malolos Congress (1898–1901) ===
Seat A					Seat B					Seat C					Seat D					Legislature	Constituency
Portrait	Member (Lifespan)	Term of office	Party	Electoral history	Portrait	Member (Lifespan)	Term of office	Party	Electoral history	Portrait	Member (Lifespan)	Term of office	Party	Electoral history	Portrait	Member (Lifespan)	Term of office	Party	Electoral history	Legislature	Constituency
District created June 18, 1898.
	Higinio Benitez	September 15, 1898 – March 23, 1901	Nonpartisan	Elected in 1898.		Graciano Cordero	September 15, 1898 – March 23, 1901	Nonpartisan	Elected in 1898.		Mauricio Ilagan	September 15, 1898 – March 23, 1901	Nonpartisan	Elected in 1898.		Manuel Sityar	September 15, 1898 – March 23, 1901	Nonpartisan	Elected in 1898.	Malolos Congress	1898–1901; Biñan, Cabuyao, Calamba, Calauan, Cavinti, Lilio, Los Baños, Luisiana, Lumban, Mabitac, Magdalena, Majayjay, Nagcarlan, Paete, Pagsanjan, Pangil, Pila, San Pablo, San Pedro Tunasan, Santa Cruz, Santa Rosa, Siniloan
District dissolved into Laguna's 1st and 2nd districts for the Philippine Assembly.

=== National Assembly (1935–1944) ===
==== Second Republic ====
Seat A					Seat B					Legislature	Constituency
Portrait	Member (Lifespan)	Term of office	Party	Electoral history	Portrait	Member (Lifespan)	Term of office	Party	Electoral history	Legislature	Constituency
District re-created September 7, 1943.
	Marcelo Zorilla (1897–1945)	September 25, 1943 – February 2, 1944	KALIBAPI	Elected in 1943.		Jesus Bautista (1897–1987)	September 25, 1943 – February 2, 1944	KALIBAPI	Appointed as an ex officio member. (Note: As Governor of Laguna.)	National Assembly (Second Republic)	1943–1944; Alaminos, Bay, Biñan, Cabuyao, Calamba, Calauan, Cavinti, Famy, Infanta, Lilio, Longos, Los Baños, Luisiana, Lumban, Mabitac, Magdalena, Majayjay, Nagcarlan, Paete, Pagsanjan, Pakil, Pangil, Pila, Polillo Islands, Rizal, San Pablo, San Pedro, Santa Cruz, Santa Maria, Santa Rosa, Siniloan
District dissolved into Laguna's 1st and 2nd districts for the House of Representatives.

=== Batasang Pambansa (1978–1986) ===
Seat A					Seat B					Seat C					Seat D					Legislature	Constituency
Portrait	Member (Lifespan)	Term of office	Party	Electoral history	Portrait	Member (Lifespan)	Term of office	Party	Electoral history	Portrait	Member (Lifespan)	Term of office	Party	Electoral history	Portrait	Member (Lifespan)	Term of office	Party	Electoral history	Legislature	Constituency
District re-created February 1, 1984.
	Arturo Brion (born 1946)	June 30, 1984 – March 25, 1986	KBL	Elected in 1984.		Rustico de los Reyes Jr.	June 30, 1984 – March 25, 1986	PSL	Elected in 1984.		Wenceslao Lagumbay (1913–1995)	June 30, 1984 – March 25, 1986	KBL	Elected in 1984.		Luis Yulo (1926–1999)	June 30, 1984 – March 25, 1986	KBL	Elected in 1984.	Regular Batasang Pambansa	1984–1986; Alaminos, Bay, Biñan, Cabuyao, Calamba, Calauan, Cavinti, Famy, Kalayaan, Liliw, Los Baños, Luisiana, Lumban, Mabitac, Magdalena, Majayjay, Nagcarlan, Paete, Pagsanjan, Pakil, Pangil, Pila, Rizal, San Pablo, San Pedro, Santa Cruz, Santa Maria, Santa Rosa, Siniloan, Victoria
District dissolved into Laguna's 1st, 2nd, 3rd, and 4th districts for the House of Representatives.

== Election results ==
=== 1984 ===
1984 Philippine parliamentary election in Laguna
Party	Candidate	Votes	%
KBL	Luis Yulo	207,977	13.76
PSL	Rustico de los Reyes Jr.	178,862	11.84
KBL	Arturo Brion	141,236	9.35
KBL	Wenceslao Lagumbay	133,037	8.80
PSL	Florante Aquino	132,900	8.79
UNIDO	Edgardo Salandanan	112,259	7.43
UNIDO	Magdaleno Palacol Sr.	84,413	5.59
PSL	Napoleon Medalla	84,313	5.58
PDP–Laban	Jun Chipeco	76,773	5.08
KBL	Leonides de Leon	52,784	3.49
PSL	Restituto Luna	48,416	3.20
UNIDO	Isidro Hildawa	42,530	2.81
UNIDO	Marciano Brion Jr.	39,980	2.65
Independent	Benjamin Agarao Sr.	36,971	2.45
PDP–Laban	Pepito Castro	31,378	2.08
Nacionalista	Jimmy Gonzales	27,870	1.84
Nacionalista	Clarence Agarao	22,980	1.52
Nacionalista	Lina Litton	19,134	1.27
Nacionalista	Diosdado Monzon	15,540	1.03
Federal	Fidel Bardos	11,843	0.78
Independent	Rodolfo Galang	9,902	0.66
