= Laguna's 2nd congressional district =

Legislative district of the Philippines

- Constituency for the House of Representatives of the Philippines
- Interactive map of district boundaries
- Location of Laguna within the Philippines
- Province: Laguna
- Region: Calabarzon
- Population: 537,865 (2020)
- Electorate: 351,176 (2022)
- Major settlements: 3 LGUs: Cities; Cabuyao; Municipalities; Bay; Los Baños
- Area: 140.28 km^{2} (54.16 sq mi)

Current constituency
- Created: 1907
- Representative: Ramil Hernandez
- Political party: Lakas–CMD

Laguna's 2nd congressional district is one of the seven congressional districts of the Philippines in the province of Laguna, formerly La Laguna. It has been represented in the House of Representatives of the Philippines since 1916 and earlier in the Philippine Assembly from 1907 to 1916. The district consists of the city of Cabuyao and adjacent municipalities of Bay and Los Baños. It is currently represented in the 20th Congress by Ramil Hernandez of the Lakas–CMD.

Prior to its second dissolution in 1972, the district encompassed the eastern Laguna municipalities of Cavinti, Famy, Kalayaan, Liliw, Luisiana, Lumban, Mabitac, Magdalena, Majayjay, Nagcarlan, Paete, Pagsanjan, Pakil, Pangil, Rizal, Santa Cruz (the provincial capital), Santa Maria, and Siniloan. Following the restoration of the Congress in 1987, it encompassed the southwestern Laguna municipalities of Bay, Cabuyao, Calamba, and Los Baños, with the creation of two additional districts in Laguna. Calamba was later separated from the district to form its own representation beginning in 2019; however, it remained part of the 2nd Sangguniang Panlalawigan district until 2024 for the purpose of electing members of the Laguna Provincial Board.

== Representation history ==
#	Image	Member	Term of office		Legislature	Party	Electoral history	Constituent LGUs
#	Image	Member	Start	End	Legislature	Party	Electoral history	Constituent LGUs
=== La Laguna's 2nd district for the Philippine Assembly ===
District created January 9, 1907.
1		Crispín Oben (1876–1947)	October 16, 1907	October 16, 1909	1st	Nacionalista	Elected in 1907.	1907–1909; Cavinti, Lilio, Luisiana, Lumban, Mabitac, Magdalena, Majayjay, Nagcarlan, Paete, Pagsanjan, Pangil, Santa Cruz, Siniloan
2		Pedro Guevara (1879–1938)	October 16, 1909	October 16, 1916	2nd	Nacionalista	Elected in 1909.	1909–1912; Cavinti, Lilio, Longos, Luisiana, Lumban, Mabitac, Magdalena, Majayjay, Nagcarlan, Paete, Pagsanjan, Pangil, Santa Cruz, Siniloan
2		Pedro Guevara (1879–1938)	October 16, 1909	October 16, 1916	3rd	Nacionalista	Re-elected in 1912.	1912–1916; Cavinti, Famy, Lilio, Longos, Luisiana, Lumban, Mabitac, Magdalena, Majayjay, Nagcarlan, Paete, Pagsanjan, Pangil, Santa Cruz, Santa Maria, Siniloan
=== La Laguna's 2nd district for the House of Representatives of the Philippine Islands ===
3		Crisanto M. Guysayko (1889–1945)	October 16, 1916	June 3, 1919	4th	Nacionalista	Elected in 1916.	1916–1919; Cavinti, Famy, Lilio, Longos, Luisiana, Lumban, Mabitac, Magdalena, Majayjay, Nagcarlan, Paete, Pagsanjan, Pangil, Santa Cruz, Santa Maria, Siniloan
=== Laguna's 2nd district for the House of Representatives of the Philippine Islands ===
4		Eulogio Benítez (1892–1973)	June 3, 1919	June 6, 1922	5th	Nacionalista	Elected in 1919.	1919–1928; Cavinti, Famy, Lilio, Longos, Luisiana, Lumban, Mabitac, Magdalena, Majayjay, Nagcarlan, Paete, Pagsanjan, Pangil, Rizal, Santa Cruz, Santa Maria, Siniloan
5		Aurelio Palileo (1892–1941)	June 6, 1922	June 2, 1925	6th	Nacionalista; Colectivista	Elected in 1922.	1919–1928; Cavinti, Famy, Lilio, Longos, Luisiana, Lumban, Mabitac, Magdalena, Majayjay, Nagcarlan, Paete, Pagsanjan, Pangil, Rizal, Santa Cruz, Santa Maria, Siniloan
6		Ananias Laico (1877–1939)	June 2, 1925	June 5, 1928	7th	Nacionalista; Consolidado	Elected in 1925.	1919–1928; Cavinti, Famy, Lilio, Longos, Luisiana, Lumban, Mabitac, Magdalena, Majayjay, Nagcarlan, Paete, Pagsanjan, Pangil, Rizal, Santa Cruz, Santa Maria, Siniloan
7		Arsenio Bonifacio (1893–1976)	June 5, 1928	June 5, 1934	8th	Nacionalista; Consolidado	Elected in 1928.	1928–1935; Cavinti, Famy, Lilio, Longos, Luisiana, Lumban, Mabitac, Magdalena, Majayjay, Nagcarlan, Paete, Pagsanjan, Pakil, Pangil, Rizal, Santa Cruz, Santa Maria, Siniloan
7		Arsenio Bonifacio (1893–1976)	June 5, 1928	June 5, 1934	9th	Nacionalista; Consolidado	Re-elected in 1931.	1928–1935; Cavinti, Famy, Lilio, Longos, Luisiana, Lumban, Mabitac, Magdalena, Majayjay, Nagcarlan, Paete, Pagsanjan, Pakil, Pangil, Rizal, Santa Cruz, Santa Maria, Siniloan
8		Mariano S. Untivero	June 5, 1934	September 16, 1935	10th	Sakdalista	Elected in 1934.	1928–1935; Cavinti, Famy, Lilio, Longos, Luisiana, Lumban, Mabitac, Magdalena, Majayjay, Nagcarlan, Paete, Pagsanjan, Pakil, Pangil, Rizal, Santa Cruz, Santa Maria, Siniloan
#	Image	Member	Term of office		National Assembly	Party	Electoral history	Constituent LGUs
#	Image	Member	Start	End	National Assembly	Party	Electoral history	Constituent LGUs
=== Laguna's 2nd district for the National Assembly (Commonwealth of the Philippines) ===
(7)		Arsenio Bonifacio (1893–1976)	September 16, 1935	December 30, 1938	1st	Nacionalista; Demócrata Pro-Independencia	Elected in 1935.	1935–1941; Cavinti, Famy, Lilio, Longos, Luisiana, Lumban, Mabitac, Magdalena, Majayjay, Nagcarlan, Paete, Pagsanjan, Pakil, Pangil, Rizal, Santa Cruz, Santa Maria, Siniloan
(3)		Crisanto M. Guysayko (1889–1945)	December 30, 1938	December 30, 1941	2nd	Nacionalista	Elected in 1938.	1935–1941; Cavinti, Famy, Lilio, Longos, Luisiana, Lumban, Mabitac, Magdalena, Majayjay, Nagcarlan, Paete, Pagsanjan, Pakil, Pangil, Rizal, Santa Cruz, Santa Maria, Siniloan
District dissolved into the two-seat Laguna's at-large district for the National Assembly (Second Philippine Republic).
#	Image	Member	Term of office		Common wealth Congress	Party	Electoral history	Constituent LGUs
#	Image	Member	Start	End	Common wealth Congress	Party	Electoral history	Constituent LGUs
=== Laguna's 2nd district for the House of Representatives of the Commonwealth of the Philippines ===
District re-created May 24, 1945.
(3)		Crisanto M. Guysayko (1889–1945)	–	–	1st	Nacionalista	Re-elected in 1941. Died before start of term.	1945–1946; Cavinti, Famy, Lilio, Longos, Luisiana, Lumban, Mabitac, Magdalena, Majayjay, Nagcarlan, Paete, Pagsanjan, Pakil, Pangil, Rizal, Santa Cruz, Santa Maria, Siniloan
#	Image	Member	Term of office		Congress	Party	Electoral history	Constituent LGUs
#	Image	Member	Start	End	Congress	Party	Electoral history	Constituent LGUs
=== Laguna's 2nd district for the House of Representatives of the Philippines ===
9		Estanislao Fernandez (1910–1982)	May 25, 1946	December 30, 1949	1st	Liberal	Elected in 1946.	1946–1957; Cavinti, Famy, Lilio, Longos, Luisiana, Lumban, Mabitac, Magdalena, Majayjay, Nagcarlan, Paete, Pagsanjan, Pakil, Pangil, Rizal, Santa Cruz, Santa Maria, Siniloan
10		Juan A. Baes (1903–1973)	December 30, 1949	December 27, 1951	2nd	Nacionalista	Elected in 1949. Election annulled by House electoral tribunal after an electoral protest.	1946–1957; Cavinti, Famy, Lilio, Longos, Luisiana, Lumban, Mabitac, Magdalena, Majayjay, Nagcarlan, Paete, Pagsanjan, Pakil, Pangil, Rizal, Santa Cruz, Santa Maria, Siniloan
(9)		Estanislao Fernandez (1910–1982)	December 27, 1951	December 30, 1953	2nd	Liberal	Declared winner of 1949 elections.	1946–1957; Cavinti, Famy, Lilio, Longos, Luisiana, Lumban, Mabitac, Magdalena, Majayjay, Nagcarlan, Paete, Pagsanjan, Pakil, Pangil, Rizal, Santa Cruz, Santa Maria, Siniloan
11		Wenceslao R. Lagumbay (1913–1995)	December 30, 1953	December 30, 1965	3rd	Nacionalista	Elected in 1953.	1946–1957; Cavinti, Famy, Lilio, Longos, Luisiana, Lumban, Mabitac, Magdalena, Majayjay, Nagcarlan, Paete, Pagsanjan, Pakil, Pangil, Rizal, Santa Cruz, Santa Maria, Siniloan
11		Wenceslao R. Lagumbay (1913–1995)	December 30, 1953	December 30, 1965	4th	Nacionalista	Re-elected in 1957.	1957–1965; Cavinti, Famy, Kalayaan, Lilio, Luisiana, Lumban, Mabitac, Magdalena, Majayjay, Nagcarlan, Paete, Pagsanjan, Pakil, Pangil, Rizal, Santa Cruz, Santa Maria, Siniloan
11		Wenceslao R. Lagumbay (1913–1995)	December 30, 1953	December 30, 1965	5th	Nacionalista	Re-elected in 1961.	1957–1965; Cavinti, Famy, Kalayaan, Lilio, Luisiana, Lumban, Mabitac, Magdalena, Majayjay, Nagcarlan, Paete, Pagsanjan, Pakil, Pangil, Rizal, Santa Cruz, Santa Maria, Siniloan
12		Magdaleno Palacol Sr.	December 30, 1965	December 30, 1969	6th	Liberal	Elected in 1965.	1965–1972; Cavinti, Famy, Kalayaan, Liliw, Luisiana, Lumban, Mabitac, Magdalena, Majayjay, Nagcarlan, Paete, Pagsanjan, Pakil, Pangil, Rizal, Santa Cruz, Santa Maria, Siniloan
13		Leonides C. de León	December 30, 1969	September 23, 1972	7th	Nacionalista	Elected in 1969. Removed from office after imposition of martial law.	1965–1972; Cavinti, Famy, Kalayaan, Liliw, Luisiana, Lumban, Mabitac, Magdalena, Majayjay, Nagcarlan, Paete, Pagsanjan, Pakil, Pangil, Rizal, Santa Cruz, Santa Maria, Siniloan
District dissolved into the twenty-seat Region IV-A's at-large district for the Interim Batasang Pambansa, followed by the four-seat Laguna's at-large district for the Regular Batasang Pambansa.
District re-created February 2, 1987.
14		Joaquin M. Chipeco, Jr. (born 1942)	June 30, 1987	June 30, 1992	8th	PDP–Laban	Elected in 1987.	1987–2019; Bay, Cabuyao, Calamba, Los Baños
14		Joaquin M. Chipeco, Jr. (born 1942)	June 30, 1987	June 30, 1992	8th	LDP	Elected in 1987.	1987–2019; Bay, Cabuyao, Calamba, Los Baños
15		Rodolfo R. Tingzon Sr. (1926–2023)	June 30, 1992	June 30, 1995	9th	LDP	Elected in 1992.	1987–2019; Bay, Cabuyao, Calamba, Los Baños
15		Rodolfo R. Tingzon Sr. (1926–2023)	June 30, 1992	June 30, 1995	9th	Lakas	Elected in 1992.	1987–2019; Bay, Cabuyao, Calamba, Los Baños
(14)		Joaquin M. Chipeco, Jr. (born 1942)	June 30, 1995	June 30, 2004	10th	LDP	Elected in 1995.	1987–2019; Bay, Cabuyao, Calamba, Los Baños
(14)		Joaquin M. Chipeco, Jr. (born 1942)	June 30, 1995	June 30, 2004	11th	LAMMP	Re-elected in 1998.	1987–2019; Bay, Cabuyao, Calamba, Los Baños
(14)		Joaquin M. Chipeco, Jr. (born 1942)	June 30, 1995	June 30, 2004	12th	KAMPI	Re-elected in 2001.	1987–2019; Bay, Cabuyao, Calamba, Los Baños
16		Justin Marc S.B. Chipeco (born 1975)	June 30, 2004	June 30, 2013	13th	LDP	Elected in 2004.	1987–2019; Bay, Cabuyao, Calamba, Los Baños
16		Justin Marc S.B. Chipeco (born 1975)	June 30, 2004	June 30, 2013	14th	Nacionalista	Re-elected in 2007.	1987–2019; Bay, Cabuyao, Calamba, Los Baños
16		Justin Marc S.B. Chipeco (born 1975)	June 30, 2004	June 30, 2013	15th	Liberal	Re-elected in 2010.	1987–2019; Bay, Cabuyao, Calamba, Los Baños
(14)		Joaquin M. Chipeco, Jr. (born 1942)	June 30, 2013	June 30, 2019	16th	Liberal	Elected in 2013.	1987–2019; Bay, Cabuyao, Calamba, Los Baños
(14)		Joaquin M. Chipeco, Jr. (born 1942)	June 30, 2013	June 30, 2019	17th	Nacionalista	Re-elected in 2016; Redistricted to Calamba's at-large district.	1987–2019; Bay, Cabuyao, Calamba, Los Baños
17		Ruth Mariano-Hernandez (born 1974)	June 30, 2019	June 30, 2025	18th	Independent	Elected in 2019.	2019–present Bay, Cabuyao, Los Baños
17		Ruth Mariano-Hernandez (born 1974)	June 30, 2019	June 30, 2025	19th	PDP–Laban	Re-elected in 2022.	2019–present Bay, Cabuyao, Los Baños
17		Ruth Mariano-Hernandez (born 1974)	June 30, 2019	June 30, 2025	19th	Lakas	Re-elected in 2022.	2019–present Bay, Cabuyao, Los Baños
18		Ramil L. Hernandez (born 1972)	June 30, 2025	Incumbent	20th	Lakas	Elected in 2025.	2019–present Bay, Cabuyao, Los Baños

== Election results ==
=== 2025 ===
Candidate	Party	Votes	%
Ramil Hernandez	Lakas–CMD	142,815	51.16
Richard Hain	National Unity Party	136,353	48.84
Total		279,168	100.00
Valid votes		279,168	96.10
Invalid/blank votes		11,341	3.90
Total votes		290,509	100.00
Registered voters/turnout		350,865	82.80
Lakas–CMD hold			
Source: Commission on Elections

=== 2022 ===
2022 Philippine House of Representatives election in Laguna's 2nd district
Party	Candidate	Votes	%
PDP–Laban	Ruth Mariano-Hernandez	168,368	59.66
Bigkis	Efraim Genuino	94,571	33.51
Valid ballots		262,939	93.17
Invalid or blank votes		19,278	6.83
Total votes		282,217	100.00
PDP–Laban hold			

=== 2019 ===
2019 Philippine House of Representatives elections
Party	Candidate	Votes	%
Independent	Ruth Mariano-Hernandez	76,386	36.16
Independent	Efraim Genuino	68,162	32.26
Independent	Isidro "Jun" Hemedes, Jr.	44,077	20.86
Independent	Jaime Caringal	19,972	9.45
PDSP	Tirso Laviña	1,580	0.75
PDDS	Rosauro Revilla	1,095	0.52
Total votes		211,272	100.00
Independent gain from Nacionalista			

=== 2016 ===
2016 Philippine House of Representatives elections
Party	Candidate	Votes	%
Nacionalista	Joaquin Chipeco, Jr.	270,906	68.87
Invalid or blank votes		122,481	31.13
Total votes		393,387	100.00
Nacionalista hold			

=== 2013 ===
2013 Philippine House of Representatives elections
Party	Candidate	Votes	%
Liberal	Joaquin Chipeco, Jr.	168,010	55.73
PDP–Laban	Teresita Lazaro	105,253	34.91
Margin of victory		62,757	20.82%
Invalid or blank votes		28,227	9.36
Total votes		301,490	100.00
Liberal hold			

=== 2010 ===
2010 Philippine House of Representatives elections
Party	Candidate	Votes	%
Nacionalista	Justin Marc Chipeco	204,926	75.72
Independent	Severino Vergara	57,049	21.08
Independent	Rosauro Revilla	8,672	3.20
Valid ballots		270,647	90.06
Invalid or blank votes		29,867	9.94
Total votes		300,514	100.00
Nacionalista hold			

=== 2007 ===
2007 Philippine House of Representatives elections
Party	Candidate	Votes	%
Nacionalista	Justin Marc Chipeco	175,310	84.93%
Independent	Susano Tapia	31,095	15.07%
Total votes		206,405	100.00
Nacionalista hold			

=== 2004 ===
2004 Philippine House of Representatives elections
Party	Candidate	Votes	%
LDP	Justin Marc Chipeco	155,760	63.35%
Lakas	Severino Lajara	87,476	35.58%
Independent	Leodegario Ilag	2,622	1.07%
Total votes		245,858	100.00

=== 2001 ===
2001 Philippine House of Representatives elections
Party	Candidate	Votes	%
KAMPI	Joaquin Chipeco Jr.	104,841	71.74%
Lakas	Rodolfo Tingzon	39,367	26.94%
Reporma	Restituto Mendoza	1,933	1.32%
Total votes		146,141	100.00
KAMPI hold			

=== 1998 ===
1998 Philippine House of Representatives elections
Party	Candidate	Votes	%
LDP	Joaquin Chipeco Jr.	91,750	51.45%
Lakas	Rodolfo Tingzon	86,581	48.55%
Total votes		178,331	100.00
LDP hold			

=== 1995 ===
1995 Philippine House of Representatives elections
Party	Candidate	Votes	%
LDP	Joaquin Chipeco Jr.	67,466	59.62%
Lakas	Emelita Carayblas	45,296	40,03%
Independent	Fidel Bardos	391	0.35%
Total votes		113,153	100.00
LDP hold			

=== 1992 ===
1992 Philippine House of Representatives elections
Party	Candidate	Votes	%
LDP	Rodolfo Tingzon	70,870	56.2%
NPC	Joaquin Chipeco Jr.	55,046	43.65%
Independent	Fidel Bardos	181	0.14%
Total votes		126,097	100.00
LDP gain from NPC			

=== 1987 ===
1987 Philippine House of Representatives elections
Party	Candidate	Votes	%
PDP–Laban	Joaquin Chipeco Jr.		
Lakas	Rodolfo Tingzon		
Independent	Fidel Bardos		
Total votes			100.00

=== 1965 ===
1965 Philippine House of Representatives elections
Party	Candidate	Votes	%
Liberal	Magdaleno Palacol Sr.	18,944	30.80
Nacionalista	Enrique Bautista	12,851	20.90
Nacionalista	Leonides de León	12,039	19.57
Liberal	Estanislao Fernandez Jr.	10,063	16.36
Independent	Dominador Baisas	5,421	8.81
Independent	Arturo Maceda	2,184	3.55
Total votes		61,502	100.00
Liberal gain from Nacionalista			

=== 1961 ===
1961 Philippine House of Representatives elections
Party	Candidate	Votes	%
Nacionalista	Wenceslao Lagumbay (Incumbent)	35,098	63.66
Liberal	Josias Guinto	18,778	34.06
Nacionalista	Alejandro Rellosa	976	1.77
NCP	Tomas Aquino	285	0.52
Total votes		55,137	100.00
Nacionalista hold			

=== 1957 ===
1957 Philippine House of Representatives elections
Party	Candidate	Votes	%
Nacionalista	Wenceslao Lagumbay (Incumbent)	29,731	65.42
Liberal	Arsenio Bonifacio	11,974	26.35
Nacionalista	Josias Guinto	3,310	7.28
Independent	Pacifico Sotelo	431	0.95
Total votes		45,446	100.00
Nacionalista hold			

== See also ==
- Legislative districts of Laguna
