= Leviste =

Leviste or Le Viste may refer to:

- Antonio Leviste, Governor of Batangas province in the Philippines from 1972 to 1980
- Arian Leviste, Filipino-American electronic music artist, producer and DJ
- Expedito Leviste, Congressman from second district of Batangas province in the Philippines from 1969 to 1972
- Feliciano Leviste, Governor of Batangas province in the Philippines from 1947 to 1972
- Leandro Leviste, Congressman from first district of Batangas province in the Philippines (2025–present)
- Mark Leviste, Vice Governor of Batangas province in the Philippines (2007–2016; 2019–2025)
- Toni Leviste, Filipino equestrian athlete
- Jean Le Viste, sponsor of the tapestry The Lady and the Unicorn
