= Ananias Laico =

Filipino politician (1877-1939)

The Honorable Ananias Laico

Member of the House of Representatives from Laguna's 2nd district
- In office 1925–1928
- Preceded by: Aurelio Palileo
- Succeeded by: Arsenio Bonifacio

Personal details
- Born: Ananías Ong-Layco y Lucena; January 24, 1877 Magdalena, Laguna, Captaincy General of the Philippines
- Died: January 9, 1939 (aged 61) Magdalena, Laguna, Philippine Commonwealth
- Resting place: Manila South Cemetery
- Spouse: Maria Rosario San Carlos Evidente (m. 1899)
- Children: 10
- Profession: Lawyer

Ananías Laico y Lucena (January 24, 1877 – January 9, 1939) was a Filipino politician and administrator during the American colonial era.

== Early life ==
[Note: Early in his life, he was known as 'Ananias Ong-Layco', using the same surname as his father, as well as 'Ananias Layco'. As an adult, however, he adopted 'Laico' as his last name, as did his brother Francisco.]

Ananias Lucena Laico was born on January 24, 1877, in Magdalena, Laguna, Philippines, the fourth child of Don Luis Ong-Layco by his second wife, Doña Maria Concepcion Bernardo Lucena. According to tradition, the Laico family originated from Xiamen (formerly known as Amoy), Fujian Province, China, although the Ong-Layco surname or variants have appeared in Laguna parish records since at least the late eighteenth century. Ananias' father was from Pagsanjan, Laguna, while his mother was from Magdalena.

A major landowner in the Magdalena area, Luis Ong-Layco was well-connected and powerful. His wife Maria Concepcion was a direct descendant of at least three eighteenth-century capitanes municipales (mayors) of the town of Majayjay, from which Magdelana was later separated. She was the granddaughter of Don Juan Pascual Bernardo, who played an important role in the founding of Magdalena and served as its second capitan municipal in 1821, as well as in 1833. Don Luis himself was capitan municipal of Magdalena in 1873–74; his oldest son Francisco, Ananias’ brother, held the same office in 1899.

The Laico family business was copra (coconut) farming. Copra was the principal crop in Laguna and brought considerable prosperity to the province at the turn of the twentieth century. The wealth from these endeavors allowed the young Ananias to study at the Ateneo de Manila and obtain a Bachelor of Arts.

== Professional career ==
Laico's response to the political upheavals in the Philippines and the occupation of the country by the United States at the end of the nineteenth century was ambivalent - and typical of the ilustrado elite, of which he was part. He served in the Filipino army during the Philippine War of Independence in the late 1890s and evidently never gave up its ideals. As late as February 1930, he and his older brother Francisco attended the First Independence Congress in Manila.

However, like other members of his social class, Ananias Laico accepted the new rulers; indeed, he flourished professionally under the American colonial administration. Following family tradition, he served as Magdalena's mayor (renamed presidente municipal) in 1901, at the youthful age of 24. By 1906, he was one of two teachers at the Central School in Magdalena, the other being his American supervisor. Later, he became the school principal.

His ambition then turned to law. He was admitted to the Philippine Bar on October 12, 1912, and practiced as a lawyer and notary (notario publico) in Magdalena.

Laico ran in the elections for the Philippine House of Representatives in June 1925, after a friend convinced him to enter national politics during a train trip from Magdalena to Manila. He narrowly won over the incumbent assemblyman for the Second District of Laguna, Aurelio Palileo, 4913 votes to 4565. Laico served as assemblyman in the 7th Philippine Legislature, a member of the Consolidado faction of the ruling Nacionalista Party. From this position, he earned the title 'Honorable.' He ran in the next election, in 1928, but lost to Arsenio Bonifacio.

In the 1930s, Laico held the office of provincial sheriff of Laguna. One of his cases, Jose H. Guevarra v. Ananias Laico, et al., reached the Supreme Court of the Philippines in 1937 and became a legal precedent used by lawyers in the Philippines. It involved the eviction of a tenant by a landlord.

== Death ==
Ananias Laico died on January 9, 1939, in Magdalena, at age 61. His cause of death was nephritis acidosis, a form of inflammation of the kidneys, though he also suffered from hypertension. His spouse Rosario survived him; she died on July 14, 1952. Laico was originally buried in the Catholic Parish Cemetery in Magdalena, however his remains (along with his wife's) were later transferred to the Manila South Cemetery.

== Legacy ==
In 1957, the Philippine Congress passed an Act changing the name of the Magdalena Elementary School to the Ananias Laico Memorial Elementary School. A son, Jaime Laico, became a pioneering plastic surgeon in the Philippines and the author of many medical papers published there as well as in the United States.

== Personal life ==
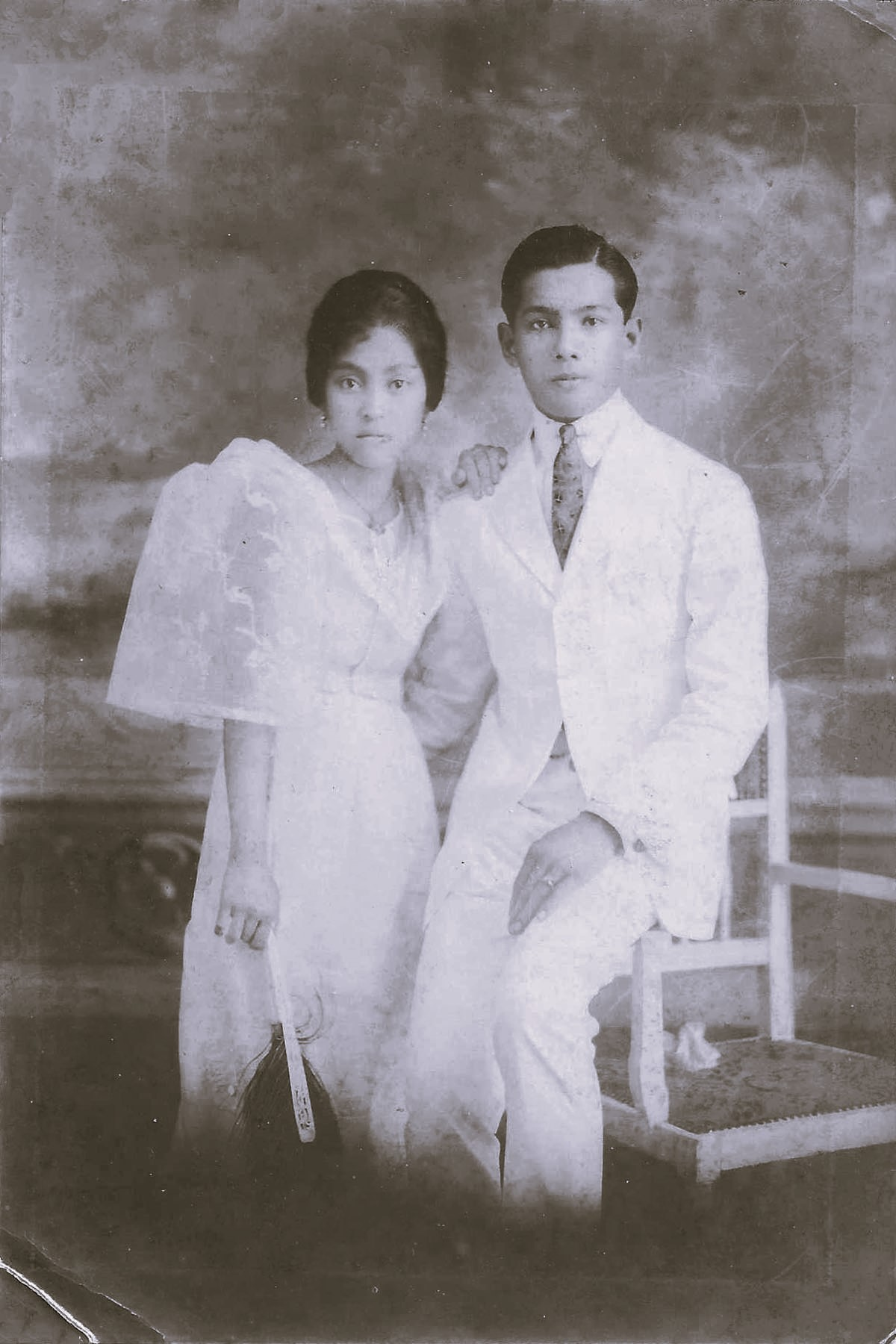
Laico with his wife Rosario Evidente in c. 1899

Laico married his third cousin Maria Rosario San Carlos Evidente, the daughter of Don Roman Bernardo Evidente and Doña Roberta Rato San Carlos of Magdalena, on April 11, 1899, at the Santa Maria Magdalena Catholic Church in Magdalena. The Evidente family was also prominent locally. Both Rosario's grandfather and father had been capitanes municipales of Magdalena; her first cousin Maximo Evidente was later presidente municipal of the same town. Ananias and Rosario Laico had ten children altogether, of whom seven survived to adulthood.
