= Region IV-A's at-large parliamentary district =

Former Philippine parliamentary district

- Former constituency for the Interim Batasang Pambansa

Former constituency
- Created: 1978
- Abolished: 1984
- Seats: 20

Region IV-A's at-large parliamentary district (also known as Southern Tagalog's at-large parliamentary district) was a constituency for the Interim Batasang Pambansa, the legislature of the Philippines from 1978 to 1984. It encompassed the provinces of Aurora, Batangas, Cavite, Laguna, Marinduque, Occidental Mindoro, Oriental Mindoro, Palawan, Quezon, Rizal, and Romblon, together with the cities of Batangas, Cavite, Lipa, Lucena, Puerto Princesa, San Pablo, Tagaytay, and Trece Martires.

The district had 20 seats in the assembly, all of which were held by members of the ruling party Kilusang Bagong Lipunan.

== List of assemblymen representing the district ==
=== Batasang Pambansa (1978–1986) ===
Portrait	Member (Lifespan) (Province/City)	Term of office	Party	Legislature	Electoral history	Constituencies
District established February 7, 1978.
	Mariano Agcaoili (Lucena City)	June 12, 1978 – June 30, 1984	KBL	Interim Batasang Pambansa	Elected in 1978.	1978–1984; Provinces: Aurora, Batangas, Cavite, Laguna, Marinduque, Occidental Mindoro, Oriental Mindoro, Palawan, Quezon, Rizal, Romblon Cities: Batangas, Cavite, Lipa, Lucena, Puerto Princesa, San Pablo, Tagaytay, and Trece Martires
	Helena Benitez (1914–2016) (Cavite)	June 12, 1978 – June 30, 1984	KBL	Interim Batasang Pambansa	Elected in 1978.	1978–1984; Provinces: Aurora, Batangas, Cavite, Laguna, Marinduque, Occidental Mindoro, Oriental Mindoro, Palawan, Quezon, Rizal, Romblon Cities: Batangas, Cavite, Lipa, Lucena, Puerto Princesa, San Pablo, Tagaytay, and Trece Martires
	Leonides de Leon (Laguna)	June 12, 1978 – June 30, 1984	KBL	Interim Batasang Pambansa	Elected in 1978.	1978–1984; Provinces: Aurora, Batangas, Cavite, Laguna, Marinduque, Occidental Mindoro, Oriental Mindoro, Palawan, Quezon, Rizal, Romblon Cities: Batangas, Cavite, Lipa, Lucena, Puerto Princesa, San Pablo, Tagaytay, and Trece Martires
	Soledad Dolor (1913–2006) (Batangas)	June 12, 1978 – June 30, 1984	KBL	Interim Batasang Pambansa	Elected in 1978.	1978–1984; Provinces: Aurora, Batangas, Cavite, Laguna, Marinduque, Occidental Mindoro, Oriental Mindoro, Palawan, Quezon, Rizal, Romblon Cities: Batangas, Cavite, Lipa, Lucena, Puerto Princesa, San Pablo, Tagaytay, and Trece Martires
	Gilberto Duavit (1934–2018) (Rizal)	June 12, 1978 – June 30, 1984	KBL	Interim Batasang Pambansa	Elected in 1978.	1978–1984; Provinces: Aurora, Batangas, Cavite, Laguna, Marinduque, Occidental Mindoro, Oriental Mindoro, Palawan, Quezon, Rizal, Romblon Cities: Batangas, Cavite, Lipa, Lucena, Puerto Princesa, San Pablo, Tagaytay, and Trece Martires
	Estanislao Fernandez (1910–1982) (Laguna)	June 12, 1978 – July 28, 1982 (Note: Died in office.)	KBL	Interim Batasang Pambansa	Elected in 1978. Died.	1978–1984; Provinces: Aurora, Batangas, Cavite, Laguna, Marinduque, Occidental Mindoro, Oriental Mindoro, Palawan, Quezon, Rizal, Romblon Cities: Batangas, Cavite, Lipa, Lucena, Puerto Princesa, San Pablo, Tagaytay, and Trece Martires
	Nemesio Ganan Jr. (Romblon)	June 12, 1978 – June 30, 1984	KBL	Interim Batasang Pambansa	Elected in 1978.	1978–1984; Provinces: Aurora, Batangas, Cavite, Laguna, Marinduque, Occidental Mindoro, Oriental Mindoro, Palawan, Quezon, Rizal, Romblon Cities: Batangas, Cavite, Lipa, Lucena, Puerto Princesa, San Pablo, Tagaytay, and Trece Martires
	Salvador Laurel (1928–2004) (Batangas)	June 12, 1978 – September 16, 1983 (Note: Resigned.)	KBL	Interim Batasang Pambansa	Elected in 1978. Resigned.	1978–1984; Provinces: Aurora, Batangas, Cavite, Laguna, Marinduque, Occidental Mindoro, Oriental Mindoro, Palawan, Quezon, Rizal, Romblon Cities: Batangas, Cavite, Lipa, Lucena, Puerto Princesa, San Pablo, Tagaytay, and Trece Martires
	Jose Leido Jr. (1934–1983) (Oriental Mindoro)	June 12, 1978 – July 30, 1983	KBL	Interim Batasang Pambansa	Elected in 1978. Died.	1978–1984; Provinces: Aurora, Batangas, Cavite, Laguna, Marinduque, Occidental Mindoro, Oriental Mindoro, Palawan, Quezon, Rizal, Romblon Cities: Batangas, Cavite, Lipa, Lucena, Puerto Princesa, San Pablo, Tagaytay, and Trece Martires
	Expedito Leviste (1928–1999) (Batangas)	June 12, 1978 – June 30, 1984	KBL	Interim Batasang Pambansa	Elected in 1978.	1978–1984; Provinces: Aurora, Batangas, Cavite, Laguna, Marinduque, Occidental Mindoro, Oriental Mindoro, Palawan, Quezon, Rizal, Romblon Cities: Batangas, Cavite, Lipa, Lucena, Puerto Princesa, San Pablo, Tagaytay, and Trece Martires
	Pedro Mendiola (1929–2005) (Occidental Mindoro)	June 12, 1978 – June 30, 1984	KBL	Interim Batasang Pambansa	Elected in 1978.	1978–1984; Provinces: Aurora, Batangas, Cavite, Laguna, Marinduque, Occidental Mindoro, Oriental Mindoro, Palawan, Quezon, Rizal, Romblon Cities: Batangas, Cavite, Lipa, Lucena, Puerto Princesa, San Pablo, Tagaytay, and Trece Martires
	Jorge Nuñez (Cavite)	June 12, 1978 – June 30, 1984	KBL	Interim Batasang Pambansa	Elected in 1978.	1978–1984; Provinces: Aurora, Batangas, Cavite, Laguna, Marinduque, Occidental Mindoro, Oriental Mindoro, Palawan, Quezon, Rizal, Romblon Cities: Batangas, Cavite, Lipa, Lucena, Puerto Princesa, San Pablo, Tagaytay, and Trece Martires
	Teodoro Peña (1932–2017) (Palawan)	June 12, 1978 – June 30, 1984	KBL	Interim Batasang Pambansa	Elected in 1978.	1978–1984; Provinces: Aurora, Batangas, Cavite, Laguna, Marinduque, Occidental Mindoro, Oriental Mindoro, Palawan, Quezon, Rizal, Romblon Cities: Batangas, Cavite, Lipa, Lucena, Puerto Princesa, San Pablo, Tagaytay, and Trece Martires
	Carmencita Reyes (1931–2019) (Marinduque)	June 12, 1978 – June 30, 1984	KBL	Interim Batasang Pambansa	Elected in 1978.	1978–1984; Provinces: Aurora, Batangas, Cavite, Laguna, Marinduque, Occidental Mindoro, Oriental Mindoro, Palawan, Quezon, Rizal, Romblon Cities: Batangas, Cavite, Lipa, Lucena, Puerto Princesa, San Pablo, Tagaytay, and Trece Martires
	Frisco San Juan (1922–2019) (Rizal)	June 12, 1978 – June 30, 1984	KBL	Interim Batasang Pambansa	Elected in 1978.	1978–1984; Provinces: Aurora, Batangas, Cavite, Laguna, Marinduque, Occidental Mindoro, Oriental Mindoro, Palawan, Quezon, Rizal, Romblon Cities: Batangas, Cavite, Lipa, Lucena, Puerto Princesa, San Pablo, Tagaytay, and Trece Martires
	Godofredo Tan (Lucena City)	June 12, 1978 – June 30, 1984	KBL	Interim Batasang Pambansa	Elected in 1978.	1978–1984; Provinces: Aurora, Batangas, Cavite, Laguna, Marinduque, Occidental Mindoro, Oriental Mindoro, Palawan, Quezon, Rizal, Romblon Cities: Batangas, Cavite, Lipa, Lucena, Puerto Princesa, San Pablo, Tagaytay, and Trece Martires
	Arturo Tanco Jr. (1933–1985) (Lipa City)	June 12, 1978 – June 30, 1984	KBL	Interim Batasang Pambansa	Elected in 1978.	1978–1984; Provinces: Aurora, Batangas, Cavite, Laguna, Marinduque, Occidental Mindoro, Oriental Mindoro, Palawan, Quezon, Rizal, Romblon Cities: Batangas, Cavite, Lipa, Lucena, Puerto Princesa, San Pablo, Tagaytay, and Trece Martires
	Medardo Tumagay (Quezon)	June 12, 1978 – June 30, 1984	KBL	Interim Batasang Pambansa	Elected in 1978.	1978–1984; Provinces: Aurora, Batangas, Cavite, Laguna, Marinduque, Occidental Mindoro, Oriental Mindoro, Palawan, Quezon, Rizal, Romblon Cities: Batangas, Cavite, Lipa, Lucena, Puerto Princesa, San Pablo, Tagaytay, and Trece Martires
	Cesar Villariba (1923–2013) (Lucena City)	June 12, 1978 – June 30, 1984	KBL	Interim Batasang Pambansa	Elected in 1978.	1978–1984; Provinces: Aurora, Batangas, Cavite, Laguna, Marinduque, Occidental Mindoro, Oriental Mindoro, Palawan, Quezon, Rizal, Romblon Cities: Batangas, Cavite, Lipa, Lucena, Puerto Princesa, San Pablo, Tagaytay, and Trece Martires
	Luis Yulo (1926–1999) (Laguna)	June 12, 1978 – June 30, 1984	KBL	Interim Batasang Pambansa	Elected in 1978.	1978–1984; Provinces: Aurora, Batangas, Cavite, Laguna, Marinduque, Occidental Mindoro, Oriental Mindoro, Palawan, Quezon, Rizal, Romblon Cities: Batangas, Cavite, Lipa, Lucena, Puerto Princesa, San Pablo, Tagaytay, and Trece Martires
District dissolved into Batangas's at-large, Cavite's at-large, Laguna's at-large, Marinduque's at-large, Occidental Mindoro's at-large, Oriental Mindoro's at-large, Palawan's at-large, Quezon's at-large, Rizal's at-large, and Romblon's at-large districts.

== Election results ==
=== 1978 ===
Candidate	Party	Votes	%
Arturo Tanco Jr.	KBL	1,562,581	5.89
Jose Leido Jr.	KBL	1,544,502	5.82
Salvador Laurel	KBL	1,491,249	5.62
Luis Yulo	KBL	1,436,239	5.41
Carmencita Reyes	KBL	1,434,232	5.41
Estanislao Fernandez	KBL	1,341,619	5.06
Soledad Dolor	KBL	1,334,265	5.03
Expedito Leviste	KBL	1,313,304	4.95
Helena Benitez	KBL	1,276,508	4.81
Teodoro Peña	KBL	1,265,083	4.77
Medardo Tumagay	KBL	1,251,502	4.72
Gilberto Duavit Sr.	KBL	1,249,036	4.71
Mariano Agcaoili	KBL	1,216,581	4.59
Godofredo Tan	KBL	1,214,765	4.58
Leonides de Leon	KBL	1,210,856	4.56
Pedro Mendiola	KBL	1,175,978	4.43
Frisco San Juan	KBL	1,167,512	4.40
Jorge Nuñez	KBL	1,165,779	4.40
Cesar Villariba	KBL	1,146,206	4.32
Nemesio Ganan Jr.	KBL	1,138,031	4.29
Pedro Medalla Sr.	Independent	190,976	0.72
Calixto Ramos	Independent	52,768	0.20
Alberto Belen	BLKNNL	46,401	0.17
Pacifico Flores	Independent	45,065	0.17
Alan Sarmiento	Emancipated Scientists Party	43,124	0.16
Augosto Cruz	Emancipated Scientists Party	42,437	0.16
Juanito Leaño	Emancipated Scientists Party	37,057	0.14
Virgilio Magnaye	Independent	36,517	0.14
Pepito Remo	Emancipated Scientists Party	33,370	0.13
Ignacio Lagunero	Partido ng Bagong Pilipino	31,292	0.12
Alfredo Dador	Independent	30,231	0.11
Total		26,525,066	100.00
Total votes		2,276,005	–
Registered voters/turnout		2,653,508	85.77
