= Quezon's at-large congressional district =

At-large Philippine legislative district for Quezon

- Former constituency for the Malolos Congress, National Assembly of the Philippines and Batasang Pambansa
- Province: Quezon
- Region: Southern Tagalog (1984–1986)

Former constituency
- Created: 1898 (first creation); 1943 (second creation); 1984 (third creation)
- Abolished: 1907 (first abolition); 1945 (second abolition); 1986 (third abolition)

Quezon's at-large congressional district may refer to three occasions when a provincewide at-large district was used for elections to the various Philippine national legislatures representing Quezon, previously known until 1946 as Tayabas.

From 1898 to 1901, four representatives from Tayabas who were elected at-large sat in the Malolos Congress, the national assembly of the First Philippine Republic. Tayabas was reorganized under the Philippine Insular Government in 1901 and was divided into two districts for the Philippine Assembly in 1907. From 1943 to 1944, the province as a whole sent two representatives to the national assembly during the Second Republic. The two-district representation was restored in the province in 1945, and the province was later renamed Quezon in 1946 in honor of former president Manuel L. Quezon.

In 1978, regional at-large assembly districts were created for the Interim Batasang Pambansa, the national parliament, with Quezon included in the 20-seat Region IV-A at-large district. The province returned to its own single, multi-member at-large district in 1984, with a four-seat delegation to the Regular Batasang Pambansa during the Fourth Republic. After 1986, Quezon elected its representatives from its separate congressional districts. The district was last represented by Cesar Bolaños, Bienvenido Marquez Jr., Hjalmar Quintana, and Oscar Santos of the United Nationalist Democratic Organization (UNIDO).

== List of members representing the district ==
=== Malolos Congress (1898–1901) ===
==== As Tayabas's at-large district ====
Seat A					Seat B					Seat C					Legislature	Constituency
Portrait	Member (Lifespan)	Term of office	Party	Electoral history	Portrait	Member (Lifespan)	Term of office	Party	Electoral history	Portrait	Member (Lifespan)	Term of office	Party	Electoral history	Legislature	Constituency
District created June 18, 1898.
	Sofio Alandy	September 15, 1898 – March 23, 1901	Nonpartisan	Elected in 1898.		José Espinosa	September 15, 1898 – March 23, 1901	Nonpartisan	Appointed by President Emilio Aguinaldo.		Basilio Teodoro	September 15, 1898 – March 23, 1901	Nonpartisan	Appointed by President Emilio Aguinaldo.	Malolos Congress	1898–1901 [data missing]
District dissolved into Tayabas's 1st and 2nd districts for the Philippine Assembly.

=== National Assembly (1935–1944) ===
==== Second Republic ====
Seat A					Seat B					Legislature	Constituency
Portrait	Member (Lifespan)	Term of office	Party	Electoral history	Portrait	Member (Lifespan)	Term of office	Party	Electoral history	Legislature	Constituency
District re-created September 7, 1943.
	Tomas Morato (1887–1965)	September 25, 1943 – February 2, 1944	KALIBAPI	Elected in 1943.		Natalio Enriquez	September 25, 1943 – February 2, 1944	KALIBAPI	Appointed as an ex officio member. (Note: As Governor of Tayabas.)	National Assembly (Second Republic)	1943–1944 [data missing]
District dissolved into Tayabas's 1st and 2nd districts for the House of Representatives.

=== Batasang Pambansa (1978–1986) ===
==== As Quezon's at-large district ====
Seat A					Seat B					Seat C					Seat D					Legislature	Constituency
Portrait	Member (Lifespan)	Term of office	Party	Electoral history	Portrait	Member (Lifespan)	Term of office	Party	Electoral history	Portrait	Member (Lifespan)	Term of office	Party	Electoral history	Portrait	Member (Lifespan)	Term of office	Party	Electoral history	Legislature	Constituency
District re-created February 1, 1984.
	Cesar Bolaños	June 30, 1984 – March 25, 1986	UNIDO	Elected in 1984.		Bienvenido Marquez Jr.	June 30, 1984 – March 25, 1986	UNIDO	Elected in 1984.		Hjalmar Quintana	June 30, 1984 – March 25, 1986	UNIDO	Elected in 1984.		Oscar Santos	June 30, 1984 – March 25, 1986	UNIDO	Elected in 1984.	Regular Batasang Pambansa	1984–1986 [data missing]
District dissolved into Quezon's 1st, 2nd, 3rd, and 4th districts for the House of Representatives.

== See also ==
- Legislative districts of Quezon
