= Magdalena, Laguna Church =

Roman Catholic church in Laguna, Philippines

Magdalena Church
- Saint Mary Magdalene Parish Church
- Parokya ni Santa Maria Magdalena (Filipino)
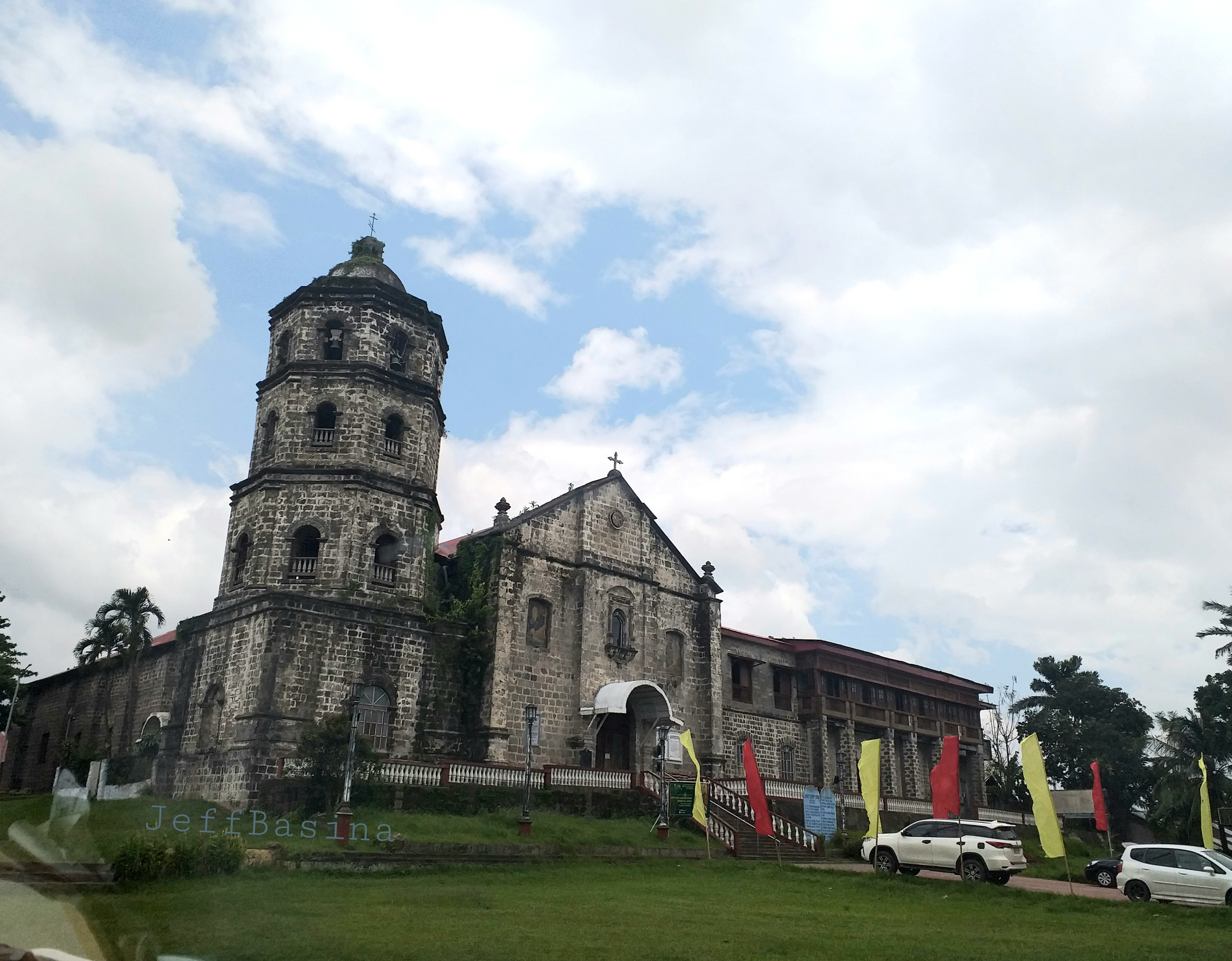
- Church façade in 2021

- Location in Laguna Location in Luzon Location in the Philippines
- 14°11′56″N 121°25′45″E
- Location: Magdalena, Laguna
- Country: Philippines
- Denomination: Roman Catholic

History
- Status: Parish church
- Dedication: St. Mary Magdalene

Architecture
- Functional status: Active
- Architectural type: Church building
- Style: Baroque
- Groundbreaking: 1829
- Completed: 1855

Specifications
- Materials: Adobe and sand

Administration
- Province: Manila
- Archdiocese: Manila
- Diocese: San Pablo
- Deanery: San Bartolome

Clergy
- Priest: Ricardo Pajutan

Saint Mary Magdalene Parish Church is a Roman Catholic church in Magdalena, Laguna, Philippines under the Diocese of San Pablo.

== History ==
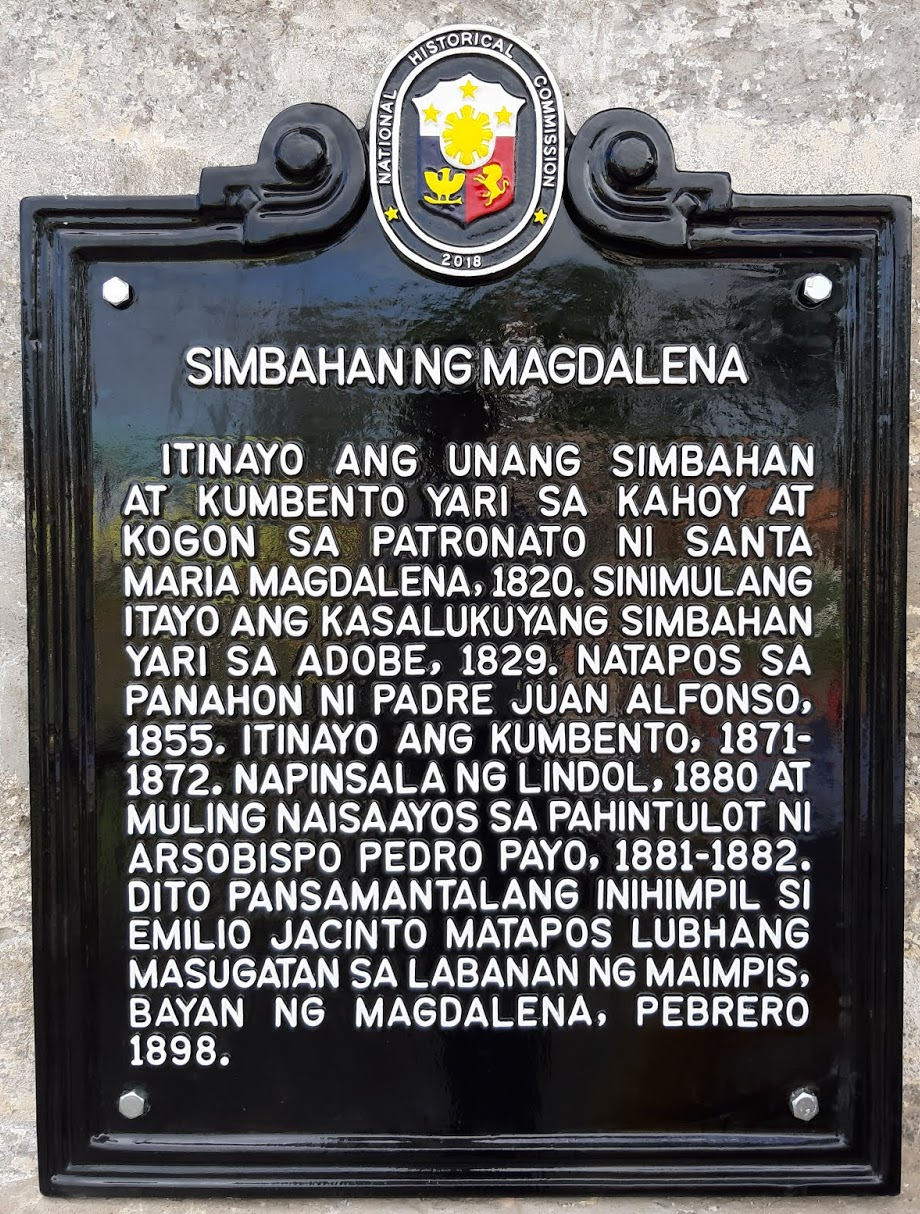
Church NHC historical marker installed in 2018

Magdalena was formerly known as Ambling, a barrio of Majayjay until it was elevated as a town in 1821. The first church, made of cogon and wood was constructed in 1820 and was dedicated to Mary Magdalene. Antonio Moreno was appointed at its first parish priest in 1821. A permission to build a stone church was ordered by Captain Pablo de la Concepción in 1829. To obtain funds for the church, the people were forced to pay taxes and quarry sand and stones from the river. The construction of the church building was halted in 1839, continued in 1849 and finished in 1855 under the direction of Maximo Rico, Jose Cuesta, Joaquin de Coria and Francisco de Paula Gonzalez. Construction of the belltower was finished in 1861.

In its convent, Filipino revolutionary leader General Emilio Jacinto sought refuge and his blood stains could be found.

== Architecture ==
The Baroque church is elevated by a flight of steps facing a plaza. It is mainly made out of sandstone. To its left is a four story octagonal belltower with a square base.

== In popular culture ==
The church has been used as a shooting location for various Filipino films, including Santiago! (1970), Sanctuario (1974), Jose Rizal (1998) and Heneral Luna (2015).

== Gallery ==
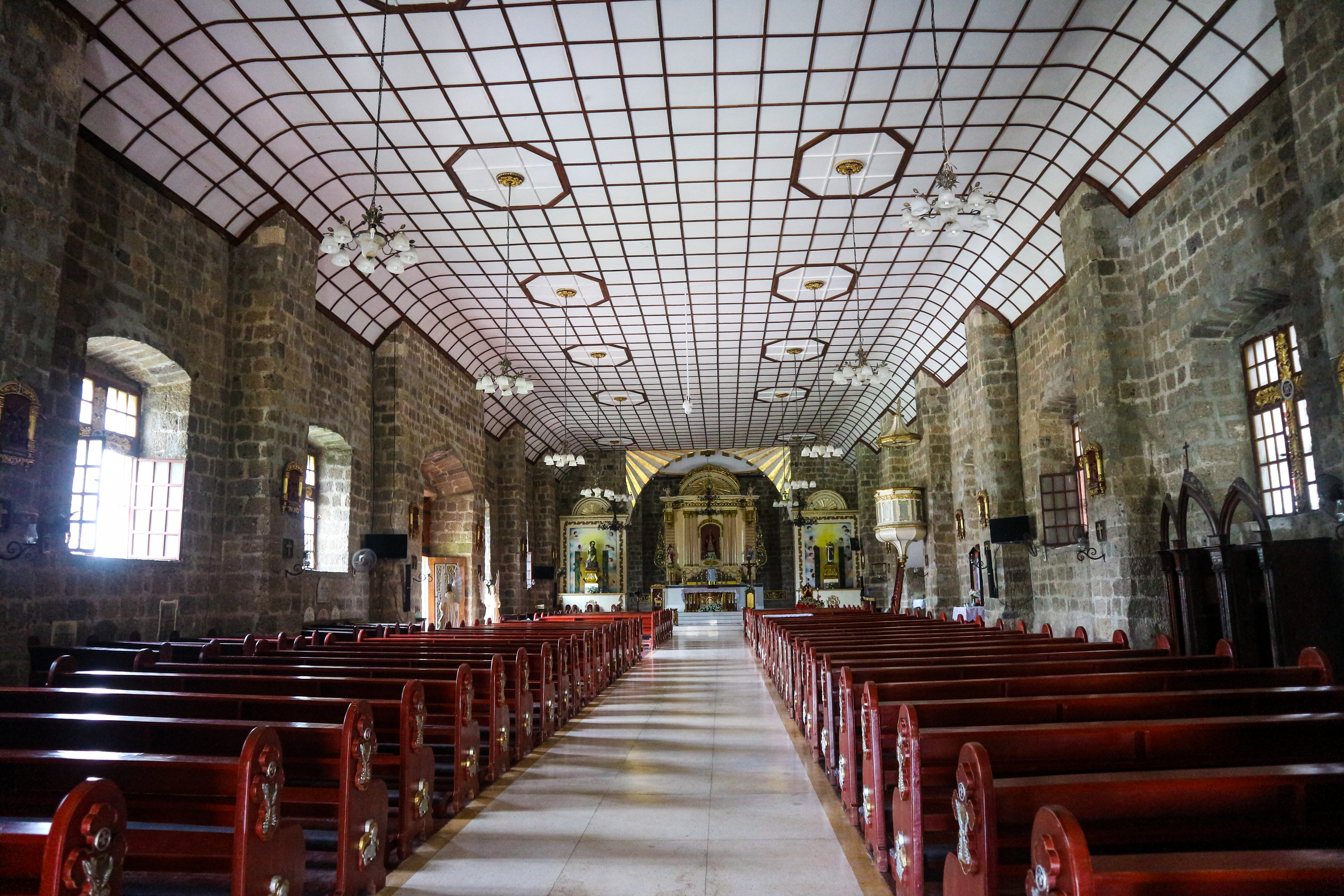
Church interior in 2019

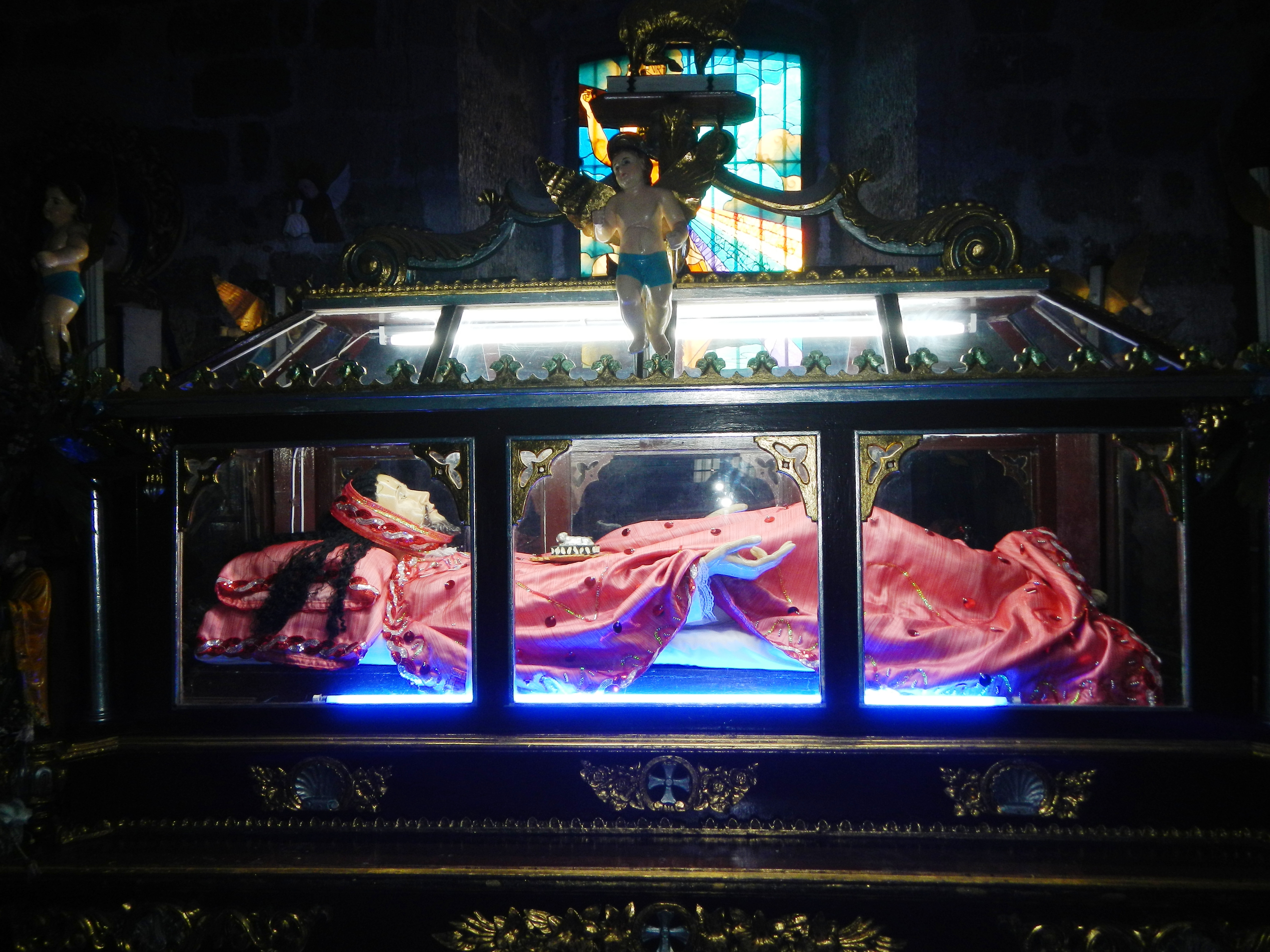
Santo Entierro

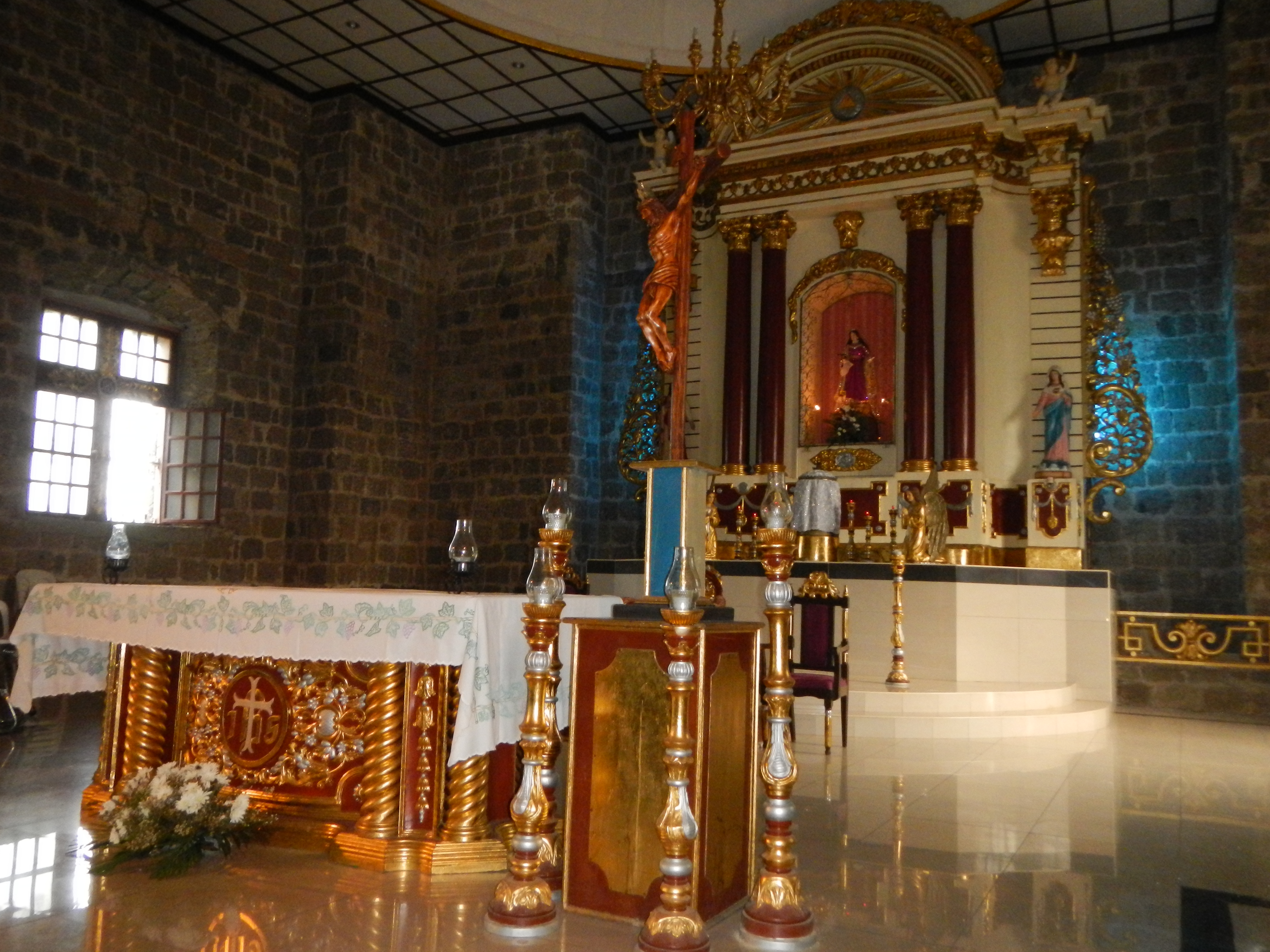
Church altar

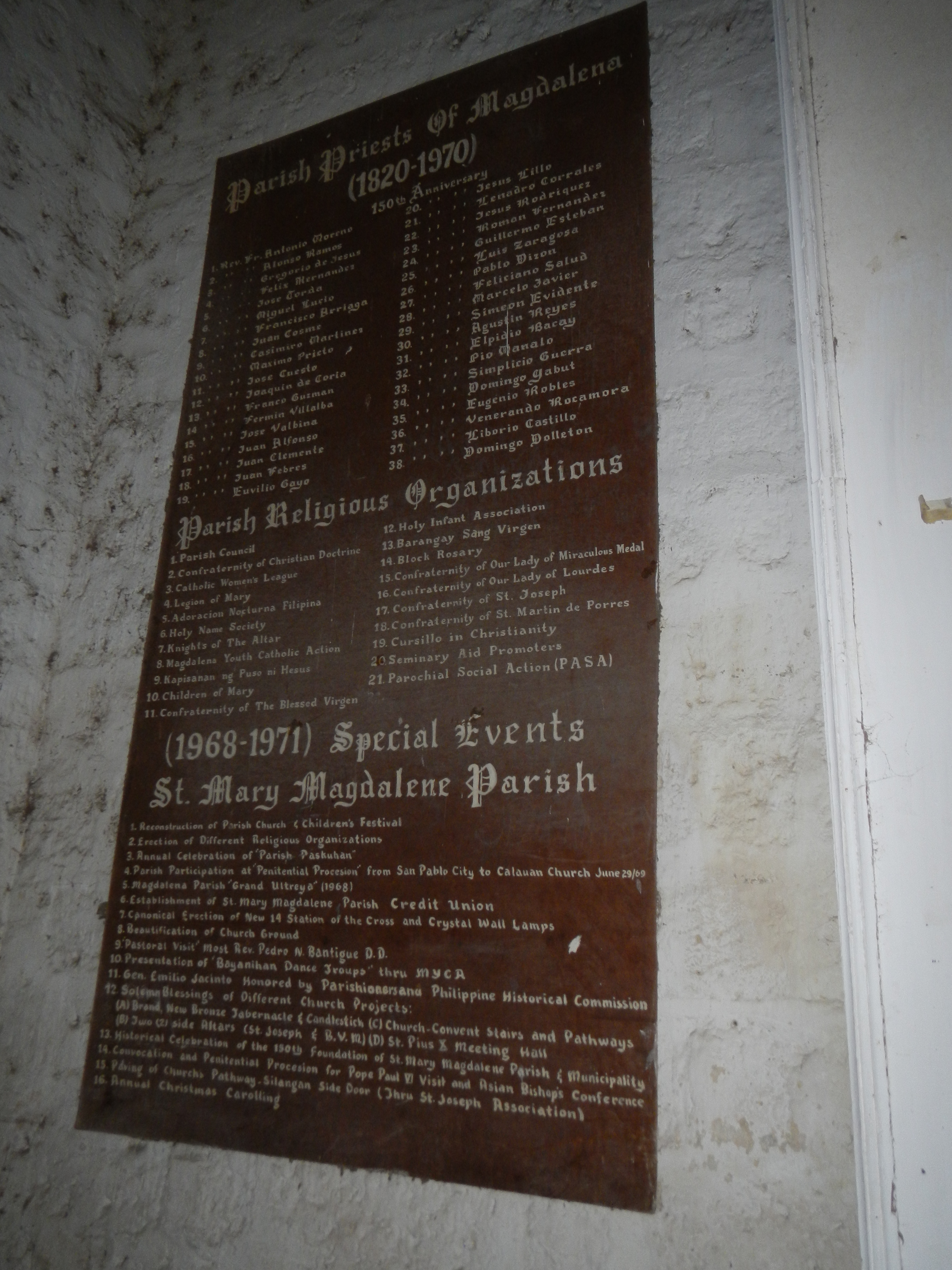
Roster of parish priests of Magdalena

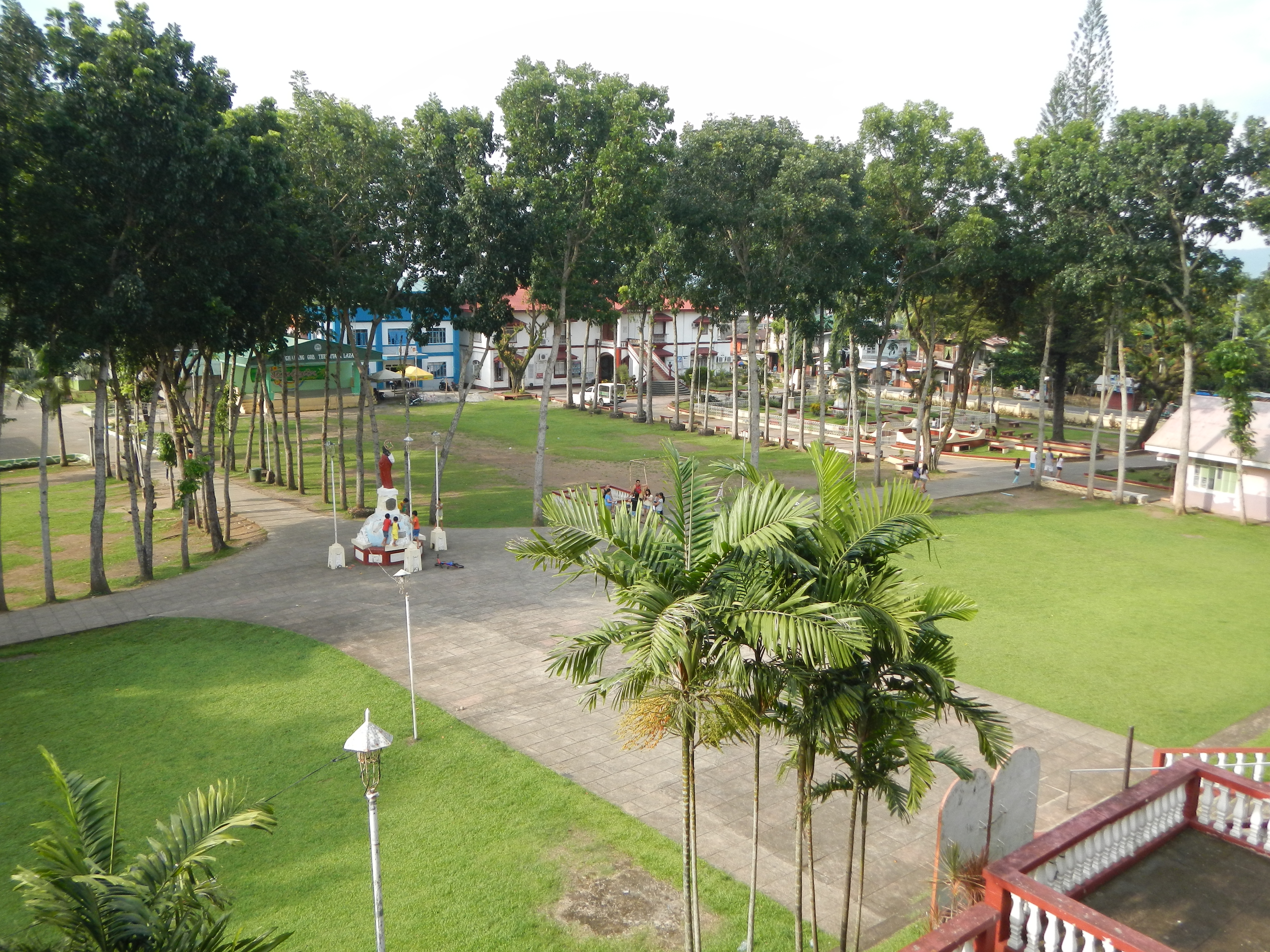
Plaza fronting the church

Bell tower

Statue of Santa Maria Magdalena
