= Magdaleno Palacol Sr. =

Filipino lawyer and politician (1918–1997)

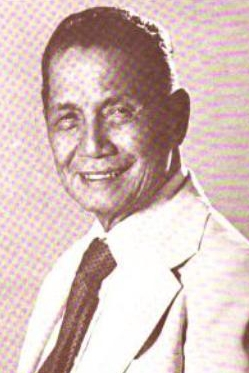
- Palacol's official portrait during the 8th Congress

Member of the Philippine House of Representatives from Laguna
- In office June 30, 1987 – August 21, 1997
- Preceded by: District established
- Succeeded by: Rodolfo San Luis
- Constituency: 4th district
- In office December 30, 1965 – December 30, 1969
- Preceded by: Wenceslao Lagumbay
- Succeeded by: Leonides de Leon
- Constituency: 2nd district

Personal details
- Born: July 22, 1918 Santa Cruz, Laguna, Philippine Islands
- Died: August 21, 1997 (aged 79)
- Party: Lakas (1994–1997)
- Other political affiliations: LDP (1988–1994); LnB (1987–1988); Liberal (1965–1969; 1987–1988)
- Spouse: Lolita Cornejo (m. 1946)
- Children: 2
- Education: Far Eastern University (LLB)

Magdaleno Mendoza Palacol Sr. (July 22, 1918 – August 21, 1997) was a Filipino lawyer and politician who served as the representative for Laguna's 4th congressional district in the Philippine House of Representatives from 1987 until his death in 1997. He previously represented Laguna's 2nd district from 1965 to 1969.

== Early life and education ==
Magdaleno Mendoza Palacol was born on July 22, 1918, in Santa Cruz, Laguna, to Victoriano Palacol, a barber-farmer turned businessman, and Maria Mendoza. He attended Santa Cruz Elementary School for his primary education and Laguna Provincial High School for his secondary education, graduating in 1938. During weekends and vacation periods, he helped his father tend their farmland. In 1946, Palacol graduated from Far Eastern University with a Bachelor of Laws degree and passed the bar examinations that same year with a score of 86%. As a student, he worked as a forestry guard at the Bureau of Forestry.

== Early career ==
Palacol went on to practice law and became a member of the San Luis, Talabis and Palacol Law Office in Santa Cruz. He later moved to Manila, where he worked at the Cornejo, Palacol and Bernabe Law Office in Pasay, often handling cases pro bono for poor clients.

In 1949, Palacol joined the Bureau of Internal Revenue (BIR) as a clerk. He was eventually promoted to examiner and later became an instructor at the BIR in-service training school in 1950. He left government service in 1961 to participate in the local Liberal Party convention as a candidate for Laguna's 2nd congressional district seat in the House of Representatives, but lost. He later served as secretary of the Laguna Provincial Board from 1961 to 1965.

== House of Representatives (1965–1969) ==
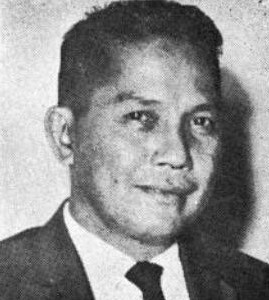
Palacol during the 6th Congress

=== First term (1965–1969) ===
Palacol secured the party's nomination in 1965 and won the seat for Laguna's 2nd congressional district in the House. During the 6th Congress, he served as chairman of the House Committee on Civil Service and vice chairman of the committees on Foreign Trade and Tourism and Agrarian and Social Welfare.

Palacol authored measures on allocating funds for scientific and technological research, development, and manpower training; promoting national development through a special foreign exchange tax; and establishing a school of fisheries in his hometown of Santa Cruz. He was part of a group of neophyte representatives known as the "Young Turks."

== Batasang Pambansa bid and 1986 elections ==
In 1984, Palacol ran unsuccessfully for a seat in the Regular Batasang Pambansa under the United Nationalist Democratic Organization (UNIDO), representing Laguna. Leading up to the 1986 snap election, Palacol proposed at a meeting of Liberal Party opposition figures that the party field a separate candidate against Ferdinand Marcos instead of supporting UNIDO-backed Corazon Aquino.

== Return to the House of Representatives (1987–1997) ==
=== Second term (1987–1992) ===
Palacol was elected to a second, non-consecutive term in 1987 under Lakas ng Bansa and the Liberal Party, following the restoration of Congress after the 1986 People Power Revolution. During the 8th Congress, he served as chairman of the House Committee on Suffrage and Electoral Reforms, vice chairman of the Committee on People's Power and Participation, and a member of the committees on Accounts, Civil Service, National Defense, and Transportation and Communications.

In November 1987, he principally authored an anti-political dynasty bill that sought to prohibit relatives up to the fourth degree of consanguinity or affinity from holding public office. He stated that the measure would "put an end to warlordism."

=== Third term (1992–1995) ===
In 1992, Palacol was re-elected under Laban ng Demokratikong Pilipino.

=== Fourth term (1995–1997) ===
Palacol was re-elected in 1995 under Lakas–CMD, but died in 1997 before completing his final term as congressman.

== Personal life ==
Palacol was married to Lolita Cornejo, with whom he had two children, including Magdaleno Jr., who served as a member of the Laguna Provincial Board from 1995 to 2001.

Palacol died on August 21, 1997.

== Electoral history ==
Electoral history of Magdaleno Palacol Sr.
Year	Office	Party	Votes received				Result
Year	Office	Party	Total	%	P.	Swing	Result
1984	Assemblyman (Laguna)	UNIDO	84,413	5.59%	7th	—N/a	Lost
1965	Representative (Laguna–2nd)	Liberal	18,944	30.80%	1st	—N/a	Won
1987	Representative (Laguna–4th)	LnB–Liberal	—N/a	—N/a	1st	—N/a	Won
1992	Representative (Laguna–4th)	LDP	57,649	47.30%	1st	—N/a	Won
1995	Representative (Laguna–4th)	Lakas	62,700	46.91%	1st	-0.39	Won

House of Representatives of the Philippines
New district	Member of the Philippine House of Representatives for Laguna's 4th district 1987–1997	Succeeded by Rodolfo San Luis
Preceded by Wenceslao Lagumbay	Member of the Philippine House of Representatives for Laguna's 2nd district 1965–1969	Succeeded by Leonides de Leon
