= Wenceslao Lagumbay =

Filipino politician (1913–1995)

The Honorable Wenceslao Lagumbay
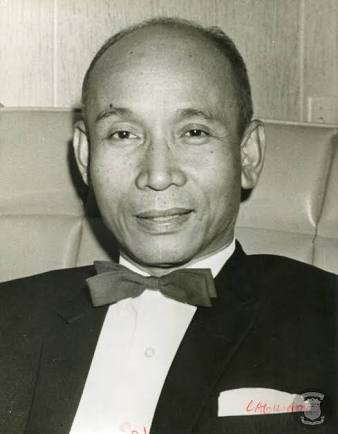

Member of the Regular Batasang Pambansa from Laguna
- In office 23 July 1984 – 25 March 1986 Serving with Arturo Brion, Rustico delos Reyes Jr., and Luis Yulo

Senator of the Philippines
- In office 30 December 1965 – 30 December 1971

Member of the House of Representatives from Laguna's 2nd district
- In office 30 December 1953 – 30 December 1965
- Preceded by: Estanislao Fernandez
- Succeeded by: Magdaleno Palacol Sr.

Personal details
- Born: 28 September 1913 San Juan, Longos, Laguna, Philippine Islands
- Died: 3 September 1995 (aged 81) Quezon City, Philippines
- Party: Kilusang Bagong Lipunan
- Other political affiliations: Nacionalista
- Spouse: Adelaida del Carmen
- Education: Far Eastern University (Bcom); Manuel L. Quezon University (LL.B); George Washington University (LL.M)

Wenceslao Rancap Lagumbay (28 September 1913 – 3 September 1995), was a Filipino politician.

== Early life and career ==
Lagumbay was born in Longos (now Kalayaan), Laguna to Eufemio Lagumbay, a municipal councilor, and Maria Rancap on 28 September 1913. After finishing high school, he moved to Manila where he worked as an advertising poster artist, an accountant and later a theater manager while pursuing degrees in arts and commerce at the Far Eastern University in 1939 and law at the Manuel L. Quezon University. He then studied at the George Washington University in Washington, D.C. and took up a master's degree in Comparative Law.

== Political career ==
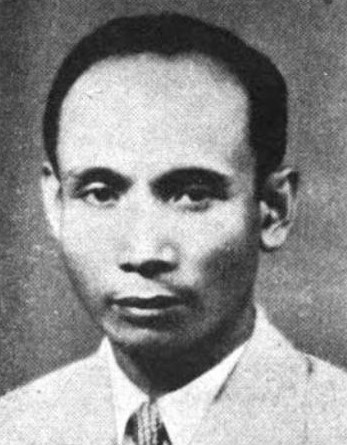
Lagumbay official portrait during the 3rd Congress.

Lagumbay was elected to the House of Representatives in 1953 to represent the 2nd District of Laguna, serving until 1965. He was then elected to the Senate as a candidate of the Nacionalista Party and served until 1971. During his time in the legislature, he became known for investigating the Central Bank of the Philippines after it incurred huge shortages and losses in collecting marginal fees collection and purchases and sales of foreign exchange. He also authored important measures such as Republic Act No. 2702, which authorized funding for the Jose Rizal National Centennial Commission in 1960.

In 1980 Lagumbay ran for Governor of Laguna but lost once again to then incumbent Governor Felicisimo San Luis. Lagumbay was last elected to the national legislature as a Nacionalista assemblyman of the Regular Batasang Pambansa representing Laguna from 1984 until its abolition in 1986.

== Personal life and death ==
Lagumbay was married to Adelaida del Carmen and died on 3 September 1995. A street in Caloocan was later named after him. His grandson Wencerom Benedict, also known as Wency, is an incumbent member of the Quezon City Council from the 3rd district.
