= Crispín Oben =

Filipino lawyer and politician

The Honorable Crispín Oben
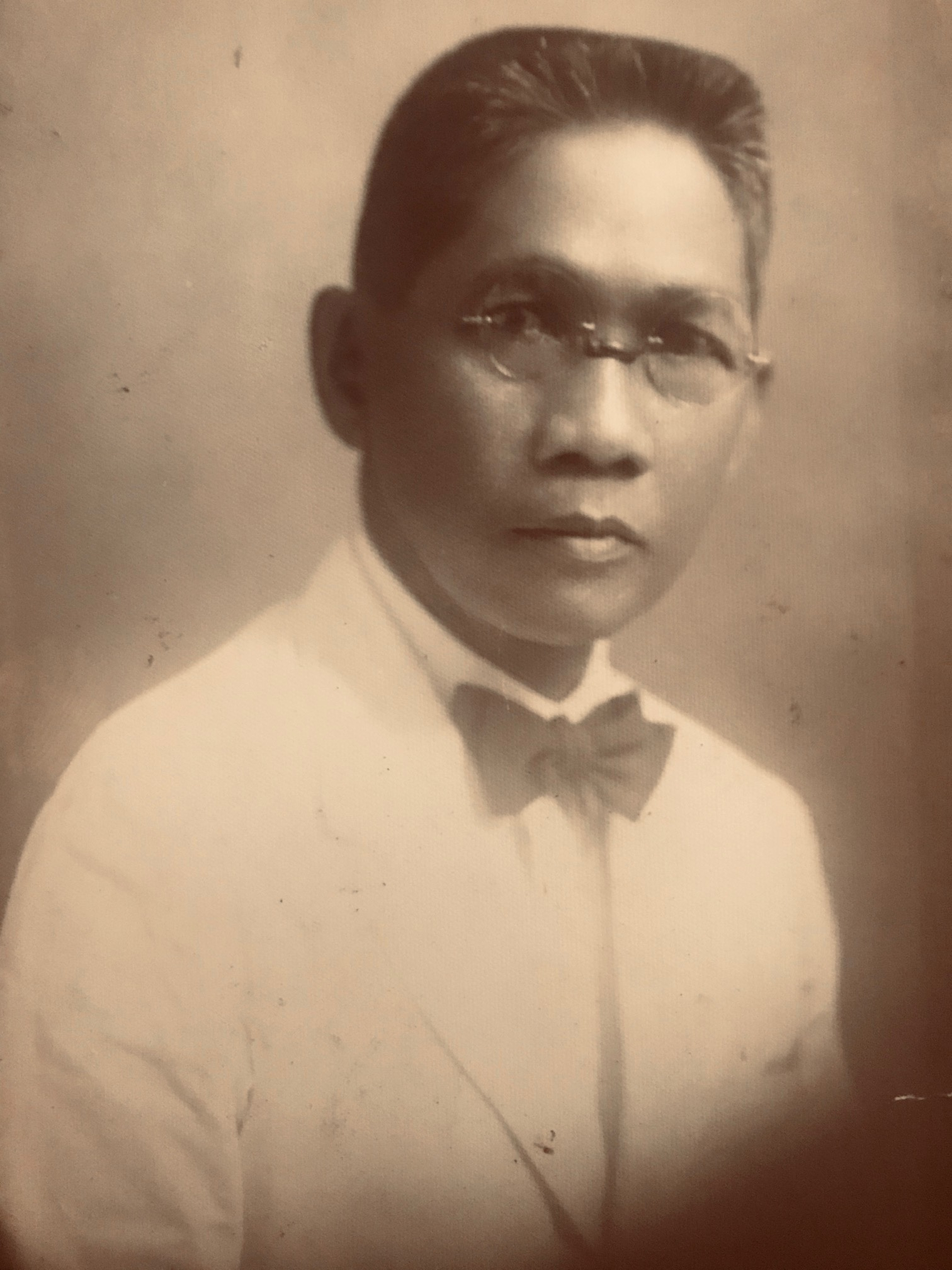
- Photographic portrait of Crispin Oben from 1919

Member of the Philippine Assembly from Laguna's 2nd district
- In office October 16, 1907 – October 16, 1909
- Preceded by: District established
- Succeeded by: Pedro Guevara

Personal details
- Born: Crispín Oben y Ballesteros; January 7, 1876 Lumban, Laguna, Captaincy General of the Philippines
- Died: August 29, 1947 (aged 71) Paco, Manila, Philippines
- Political party: Nacionalista

Crispín Oben y Ballesteros (January 7, 1876 – August 29, 1947) was a Filipino lawyer and politician born in Lumban, Laguna, Philippines.

== Early life and education ==
Born during Spanish colonial rule, he belonged to the prominent and wealthy Oben family who were of the Illsutrado class. A learned man who was born into a bilingual Spanish-Tagalog household, he also learned the English language from an ex-American soldier. Crispín Oben finished his Bachelor of Arts Degree at Colegio de San Juan de Letran in 1895. He then proceeded to study at the University of Santo Tomas from 1895–1898. He studied law at the Escuela de Derecho from 1900–1902.

== Political career ==
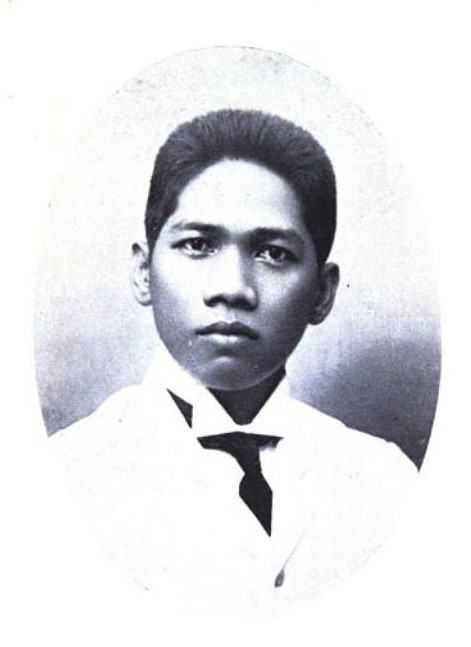
Oben as a member of the Philippine Assembly, 1908

He was a member of the First Philippine Assembly from 1907 to 1909 representing the second district of La Laguna.

== Personal life ==
He was married to Victoria Capistrano with whom he had twelve children, four of whom became nuns. His son, Ramón Tomás Oben, went on to become the Commissioner for the Bureau of Internal Revenue under the administration of President Diosdado Macapagal and the Dean of Law at the University of Santo Tomas.
