= Feliciano Leviste =

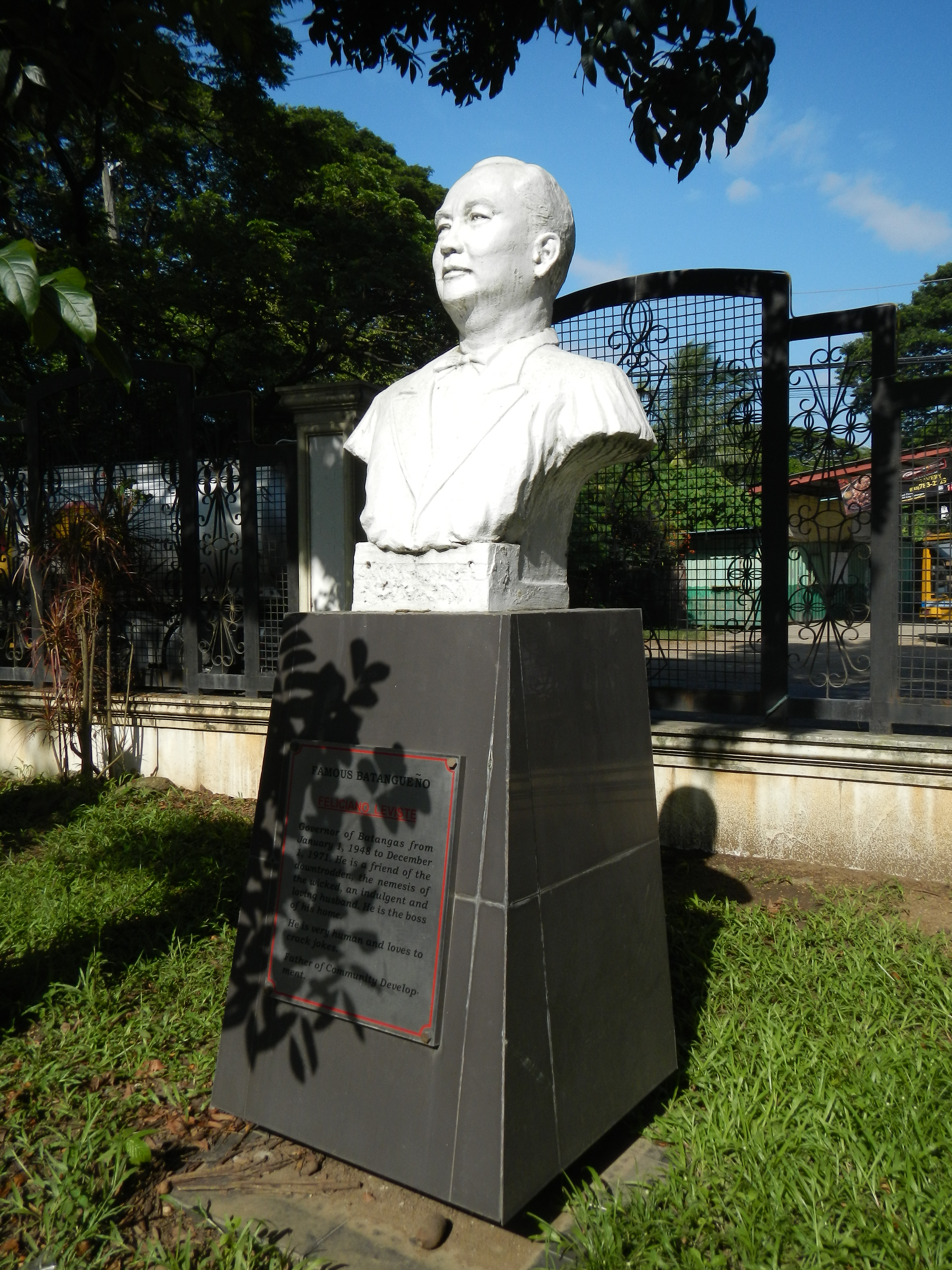
- Bust of Leviste at Historical Park, Batangas City

16th Governor of Batangas
- In office 1948–1971
- Vice Governor: None (1948–1959); Bonifacio Masilungan (1960–1963); Nicetas A. Suanes (1964–1967); Antonio C. Carpio (1968–1971)
- Preceded by: Vicente del Rosario
- Succeeded by: Antonio C. Carpio

Personal details
- Born: June 9, 1897 Lipa, Batangas, Captaincy General of the Philippines
- Died: March 29, 1976 (aged 78) Santo Tomas, Batangas, Philippines
- Party: Nacionalista
- Spouse: Aurelia Maloles Malvar

Feliciano Panganiban Leviste (June 9, 1897 – March 29, 1976), popularly known as "Sanoy", was governor of Batangas province in the Philippines from 1948 to 1971. Respected for his populist platform, Leviste governed Batangas during an unprecedented twenty four years, winning six elections in the process. He was a member of the Nacionalista party.

Footnote 5 on page 135 in Richard Neely's How Courts Govern America recounts the author's brief experience living in the Governor's palace. He specifically recalls Leviste's policy of allowing underprivileged Batangueños to simply walk into the palace and have a free meal, typifying Leviste's populist platform.

== Personal life ==
He was married to Aurelia Malvar Leviste, daughter of Philippine revolutionary general Miguel Malvar. He was the father of Expedito Leviste, a representative from Batangas, and Rodolfo Leviste.
