= Estanislao Fernandez =

Filipino politician (1910–1982)

The Honorable Estanislao A. Fernandez
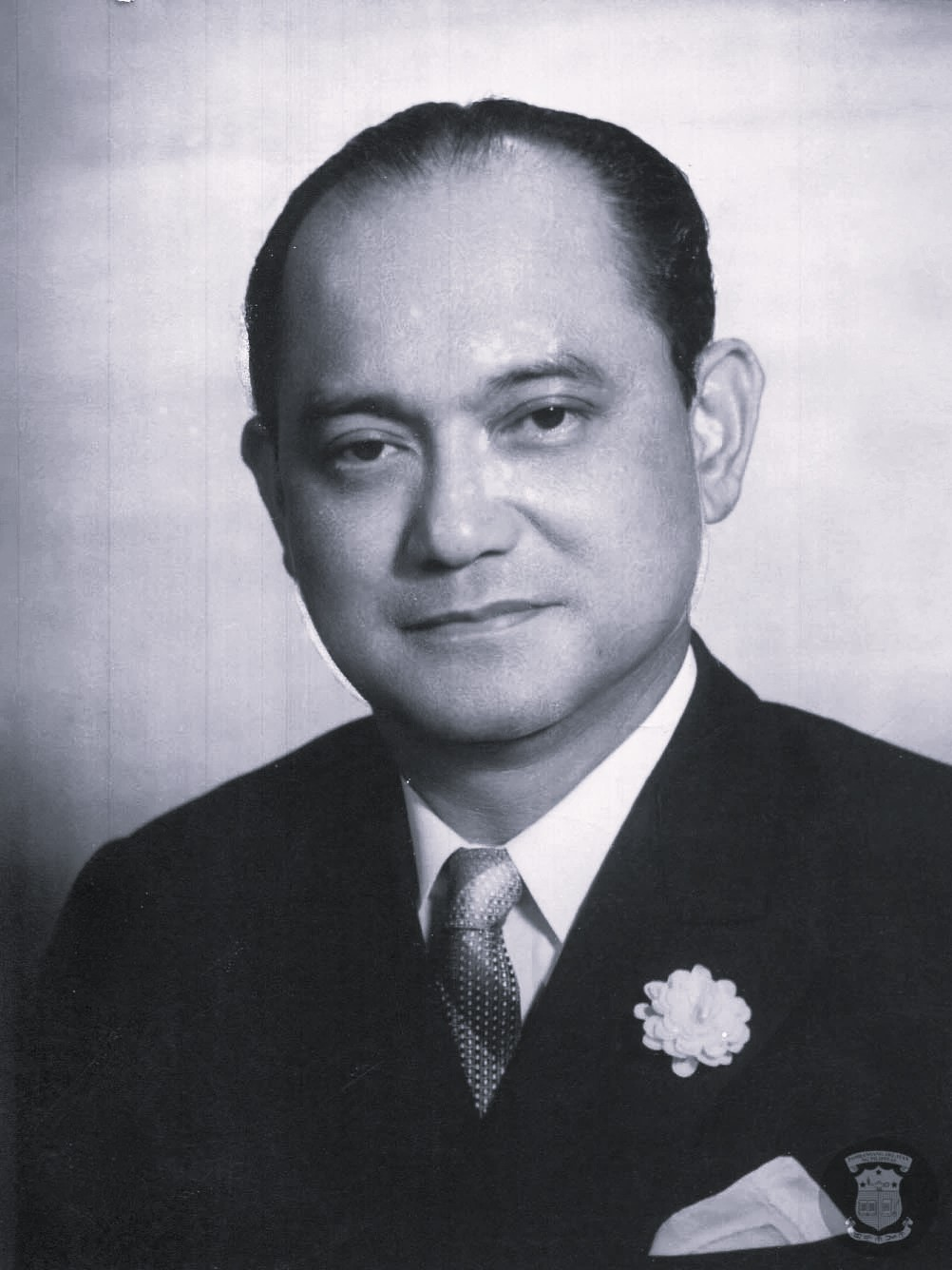

Regional Assemblyman from Region IV-A
- In office June 12, 1978 – July 28, 1982

88th Associate Justice of the Supreme Court of the Philippines
- In office October 19, 1973 – March 28, 1975
- Nominated by: Ferdinand Marcos
- Preceded by: J. B. L. Reyes
- Succeeded by: Ruperto Martin

Senate Minority Leader
- In office January 22, 1962 – December 30, 1965
- President: Diosdado Macapagal
- Preceded by: Ferdinand Marcos
- Succeeded by: Ambrosio Padilla

Senator of the Philippines
- In office December 30, 1959 – December 30, 1965

Member of the Philippine House of Representatives from Laguna's 2nd district
- In office December 27, 1951 – December 30, 1953
- Preceded by: Juan Baes
- Succeeded by: Wenceslao Lagumbay
- In office July 9, 1945 – December 30, 1949
- Preceded by: Crisanto Guysayko
- Succeeded by: Juan Baes

Personal details
- Born: March 28, 1910 Liliw, Laguna, Philippine Islands
- Died: July 28, 1982 (aged 72) Marikina, Philippines
- Party: Kilusang Bagong Lipunan (1978–1982)
- Other political affiliations: Liberal (1946–1973); Nacionalista (until 1946)
- Spouse: Soledad Camello
- Education: University of the Philippines Diliman (LL.B)
- Occupation: Lawyer

Estanislao Arceta Fernandez Jr. (March 28, 1910 – July 28, 1982) was an Associate Justice of the Supreme Court of the Philippines. In college, he distinguished himself as a debater and orator. In the practice of law, he earned wide reputation for championing "lost cases", including a criminal case in Supreme Court of the United States.

== Early life and education ==
Fernandez was born in Liliw, Laguna to Estanislao Fernández Sr. and Silveria Arceta. He studied law at the University of the Philippines College of Law and graduated in 1933, where he was a member of the Upsilon Sigma Phi fraternity. He passed the bar examinations in 1935.

== Career ==
=== Congress ===
In the 1946, Fernandez ran for representative of the Laguna's 2nd district under the banner of the Liberal Party and won. He initially lost his re-election bid in 1949 to Juan Baes but his victory was affirmed in 1951 after winning his electoral protest. He ran for senator in 1957 but lost. He was elected senator in 1959.

=== Supreme Court ===
He was appointed to the Supreme Court of the Philippines on October 19, 1973, as Associate Justice and served until retirement age.

=== Batasang Pambansa ===
In the Batasan, he was a member of the following committees: Foreign Affairs, Justice Human Rights and Good Government, Public Highways, Revision of laws, and Codes and Constitutional Amendments.

He was elected Regional Mambabatas Pambansa from Region IV-A in 1978 under the Banner of Kilusang Bagong Lipunan.

== Personal life ==
Fernandez was married to Soledad Camello-Fernandez. He is of relation to Danilo Fernandez, who is the grandson of his first cousin and incumbent representative of Santa Rosa, Laguna.

Fernandez's 24-year-old son Arturo was murdered by Napoleon Medalla, then chairman of the Savings Bank of Manila, his two bodyguards Ceferino Medrana and Teody Belarmino and his driver at a restaurant's parking lot near Muni Golf Links on the evening of September 5, 1967. The four attempted to bring Fernandez to the hospital, but he was declared dead upon arrival. In 1981, the Supreme Court sentenced Medrana to reclusión perpetua for his participation in the shootout.

Fernandez is buried at Loyola Memorial Park in Marikina.

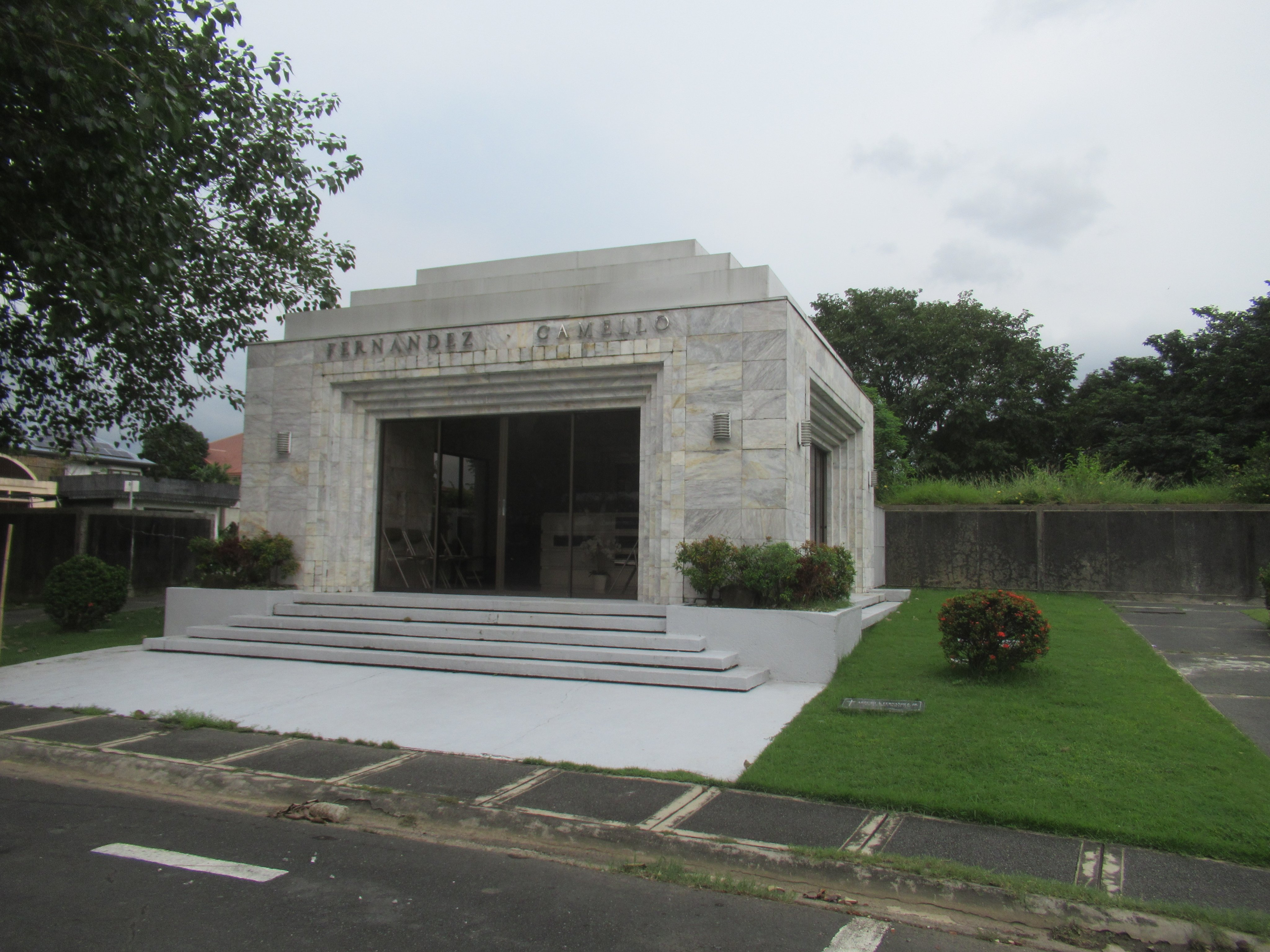
Fernandez–Camello mausoleum

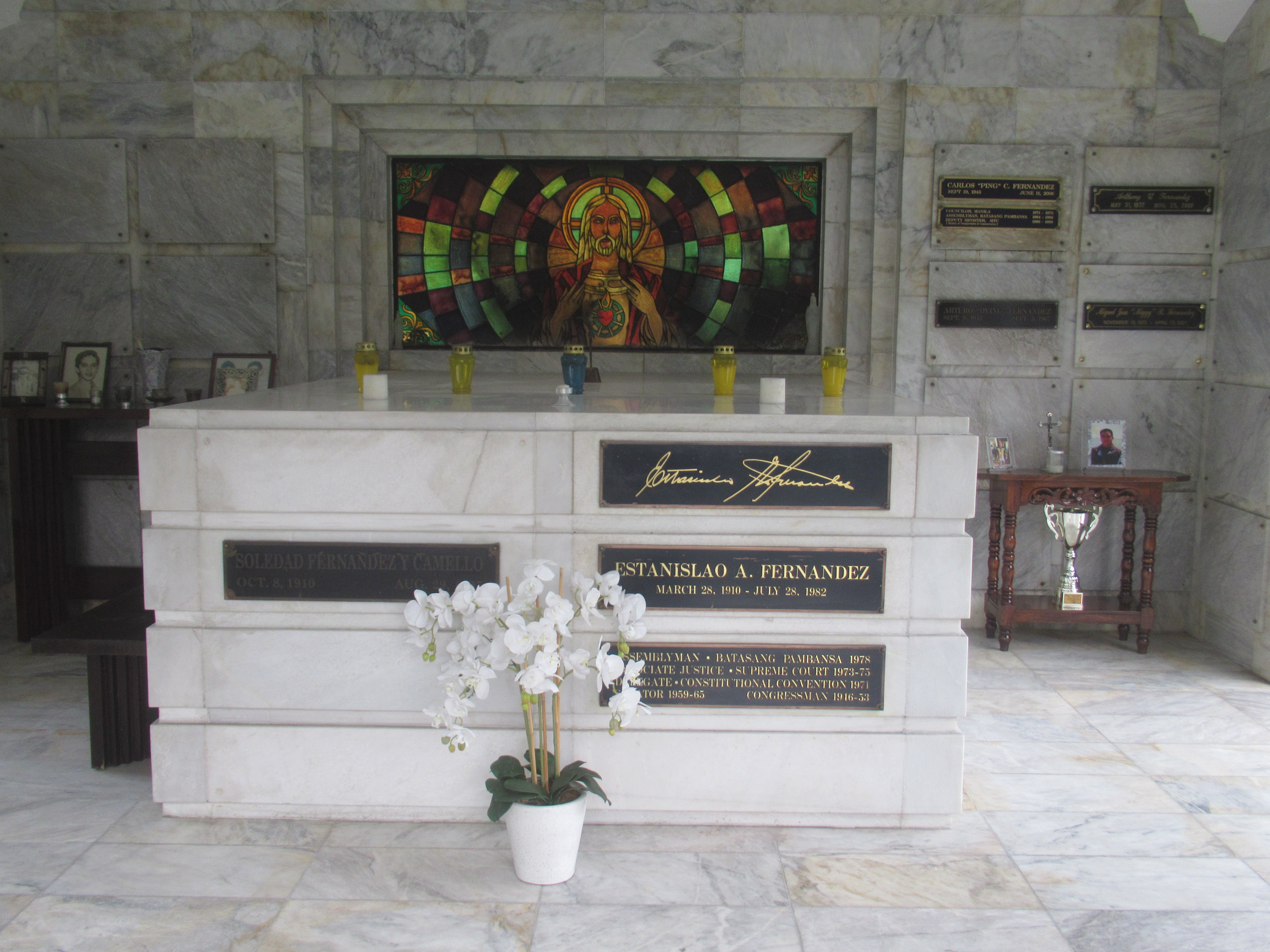
Tomb of Fernandez and his wife Soledad, with that of their family on the background
