= Expedito Leviste =

Expedito Malvar Leviste (April 19, 1928–September 6, 1999) was a member of the congress of the Philippines from the province of Batangas and a member of the Philippine delegation to the United Nations.

He served with the Philippine delegation to the United Nations for a conference in 1960.

He served as Representative from the 2nd District of Batangas to the House of Representatives during the 7th Congress of the Philippines and as a Representative from Region IV-A to the Interim Batasang Pambansa (National Assembly) from 1978 to 1984.

His father was Feliciano "Sanoy" Leviste, populist Governor of Batangas from 1947 to 1972. His grandfather was General Miguel Malvar. Through his marriage to Ma. Cristina Borbon, he was the son-in-law to Fortunato Borbon, who served as Governor of Batangas from February to November 1945.
