= Rizal, Laguna =

Municipality in Laguna, Philippines

Rizal Pauli
- Municipality
- Municipality of Rizal
- Rizal Municipal Hall Rizal Town Proper Saint Michael the Archangel Parish Church

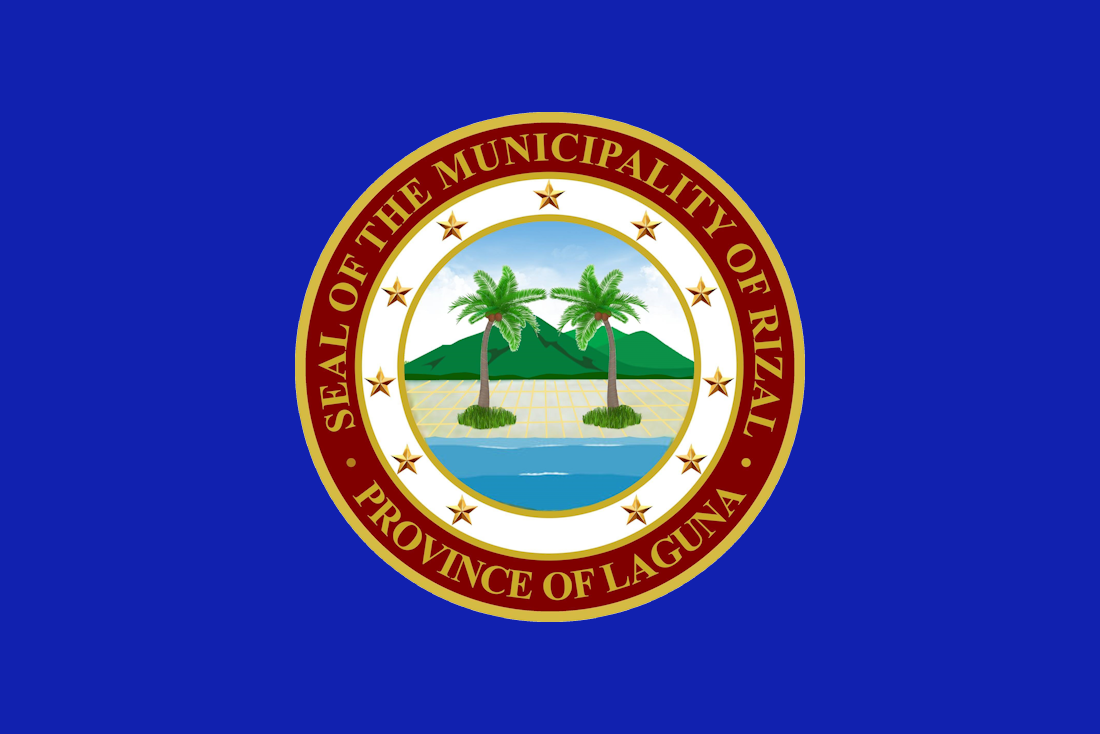
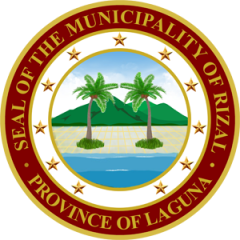
- Flag Seal

- Map of Laguna with Rizal highlighted
- Interactive map of Rizal
- Location within the Philippines
- Coordinates: 14°06′30″N 121°23′30″E
- Country: Philippines
- Region: Calabarzon
- Province: Laguna
- District: 3rd district
- Founded: January 7, 1919
- Named for: Dr. José Rizal
- Barangays: 11 (see Barangays)

Government
  - Type: Sangguniang Bayan
  - Mayor: Vener P. Muñoz (PDP–Laban)
  - Vice Mayor: Antonino A. Aurelio (PDP–Laban)
  - Representative: Loreto Amante (PFP)
  - Municipal Council: Members: Teodorico J. Arestado; John Ian S. Muñoz; Harold V. Austral; Vincent Jolo A. Royo; Marvin M. Opulencia; Lilibeth A. Hicban; Jerry A. Malixi; Vener I. Hugo
  - Electorate: 13,267 voters (2025)

Area
  - Total: 27.90 km^{2} (10.77 sq mi)
- Elevation: 397 m (1,302 ft)
- Highest elevation: 1,489 m (4,885 ft)
- Lowest elevation: 142 m (466 ft)

Population (2024 census)
  - Total: 18,864
  - Density: 676.1/km^{2} (1,751/sq mi)
  - Households: 4,638

Economy
  - Income class: 4th municipal income class
  - Poverty incidence: 10.67% (2023)
  - Revenue: ₱ 116.5 million (2024)
  - Assets: ₱ 460.2 million (2024)
  - Expenditure: ₱ 32.98 million (2024)
  - Liabilities: ₱ 174.9 million (2024)

Service provider
  - Electricity: Manila Electric Company (Meralco)
- Time zone: UTC+8 (PST)
- ZIP code: 4003
- PSGC: 0403423000
- IDD : area code: +63 (0)49
- Native languages: Tagalog

Rizal, officially the Municipality of Rizal (Tagalog: Bayan ng Rizal), is a municipality in the province of Laguna, Philippines. According to the 2024 census, it has a population of 18,864 people.

This town is the birthplace of the milky mixed vegetable dish called "amenudong gulay".

== Etymology ==
The municipality, named after Laguna native and Philippine national hero José Rizal, is one of the youngest municipalities in Laguna.

== History ==
The kaingineros were among the first reported settlers in this part of Laguna around the 17th century. Around mid-1800, this area was called barrio "Pauli" and was part of the town of Nagcarlan.

Residents from this place used to say that the barrio "Pauli" got its name from the way that its brook flows at the edge of the settlement, whose stream flows back and forth. “Pauli,” must have come from the Tagalog word “Pauli-uli,” which means coming back and forth.

Ever since, villagers earn their living by farming. The soil in this barrio is rich and is abundant of water for there were numerous natural springs around the settlement, making the settlers enjoy bountiful harvests of coconuts, root crops, vegetables, and rice. Locales also thrive by fishing from the Mayton and Mayit brooks and Calibato Lake, which the village share with the town of Sampalok, which is now San Pablo.

When the Spanish rule ended and the Philippines became a commonwealth state of the United States, Pauli became independent from the town of Nagcarlan and became a new township. The American Government appointed Pedro Urrea the Municipal President. Nevertheless, Pauli's township lasted only for two years. Its inability to support its administrative expenses caused Pauli to affiliate once more with its mother town.

However, between 1912 and 1915, residents led by Fortunato Urrea Arban, Agustin Vista, and Felix Isleta, former municipal councilors campaigned to regain their municipal status. The petition included the inclusion of barrios Antipolo, Entablado, Laguan, Pook, Mayton, Pauli, Talaga and Tuy. On December 18, 1918, Governor-General Francis Burton Harrison issued Executive Order No. 56 creating the Municipality of Rizal, naming the town after the foremost national hero and Laguna native José Rizal.

Officials inaugurated the new town a year after on January 7, 1919, and had Fortunato Urrea Arban as mayor. Before the citizens of Pauli won back their township, Innocente Sumague donated a piece of land for the construction of a church (Parroquia De San Miguel Arcangel) in 1916. Construction workers quarried Mayton Creek for stones and gravel. The quarry claimed many lives before the construction ended, in time for the midnight mass of Christmas of 1917.

Pablo Urrea became the mayor in 1941 and subsequently relinquished his post to lead the guerrilla fighters during the Japanese occupation.

== Geography ==
Rizal is a landlocked municipality located 46 kilometers (29 mi) from the provincial capital Santa Cruz and 91 kilometers (57 mi) from Manila. It is bounded on the north by Calauan, on the east by Nagcarlan, on the west by San Pablo, and on the south by Dolores.

Located amidst coconut groves, Rizal is surrounded by the foothills of Mount San Cristobal, Mount Banahaw, and the Basilin Hill.

=== Barangays ===
Rizal is politically subdivided into 11 barangays, as indicated below. Each barangay consists of puroks and some have sitios.

- Antipolo
- Entablado
- Laguan
- Pauli 1
- Pauli 2
- East Poblacion
- West Poblacion
- Pook
- Tala
- Talaga
- Tuy

=== Climate ===
Climate data for Rizal, Laguna
Month	Jan	Feb	Mar	Apr	May	Jun	Jul	Aug	Sep	Oct	Nov	Dec	Year
Mean daily maximum °C (°F)	25 (77)	27 (81)	28 (82)	30 (86)	30 (86)	29 (84)	28 (82)	28 (82)	27 (81)	27 (81)	27 (81)	26 (79)	28 (82)
Mean daily minimum °C (°F)	19 (66)	19 (66)	19 (66)	21 (70)	22 (72)	23 (73)	23 (73)	22 (72)	22 (72)	21 (70)	21 (70)	20 (68)	21 (70)
Average precipitation mm (inches)	52 (2.0)	35 (1.4)	27 (1.1)	27 (1.1)	82 (3.2)	124 (4.9)	163 (6.4)	144 (5.7)	145 (5.7)	141 (5.6)	100 (3.9)	102 (4.0)	1,142 (45)
Average rainy days	12.0	8.1	8.8	9.7	17.9	22.6	26.2	24.5	24.6	22.0	16.7	14.9	208
Source: Meteoblue

== Demographics ==
Population census of Rizal
Year	Pop.	±% p.a.
1903	1,882	—
1939	3,036	+1.34%
1948	3,901	+2.82%
1960	5,392	+2.73%
1970	6,539	+1.95%
1975	8,097	+4.38%
1980	7,510	−1.49%
1990	9,501	+2.38%
1995	11,537	+3.71%
2000	13,006	+2.60%
2007	15,459	+2.41%
2010	15,518	+0.14%
2015	17,253	+2.04%
2020	18,332	+1.28%
2024	18,864	+0.69%
Source: Philippine Statistics Authority

In the 2024 census, the population of Rizal was 18,864 people, with a density of 680 inhabitants per square kilometer or 1,800 inhabitants per square mile.

== Economy ==
Poverty incidence of Rizal (%)

Source: Philippine Statistics Authority

== Culture ==
The town maintains a longstanding tradition of celebrating Christmas on January 6. Local legend also recounts apparitions of Saint Michael the Archangel at the town’s largest natural spring, known as Bukal ni San Miguel, during the Spanish period, which led to his designation as the town’s patron saint.

The Rizal Re-Recreational Center, a Christian retreat and recreational facility, is also located in the town. It houses the world’s largest functional spinning top, measuring 10.5 feet in height and weighing approximately 990 pounds, which is displayed on the premises.

== Education ==
The Nagcarlan-Rizal Schools District Office governs all educational institutions within the municipality. It oversees the management and operations of all private and public, from primary to secondary schools.

=== Primary and elementary schools ===
- Antipolo Sulsuguin Elementary School
- Pook Elementary School
- Rizal Elementary School

=== Secondary schools ===
- Cristobal S. Conducto Memorial National High School
- Covenant Christian Academy of Rizal Laguna

== Notable personalities ==
- Angelica Jones, actress-politician
- Johndave and Edward Picache, saxophone players of the Filipino band South Border
