= Magdalena, Laguna =

Municipality in Laguna, Philippines

Magdalena Magdalena de Ambling
- Municipality
- Municipality of Magdalena
- Santa Maria Magdalena Parish Church Magdalena Town Plaza Magdalena Town Proper

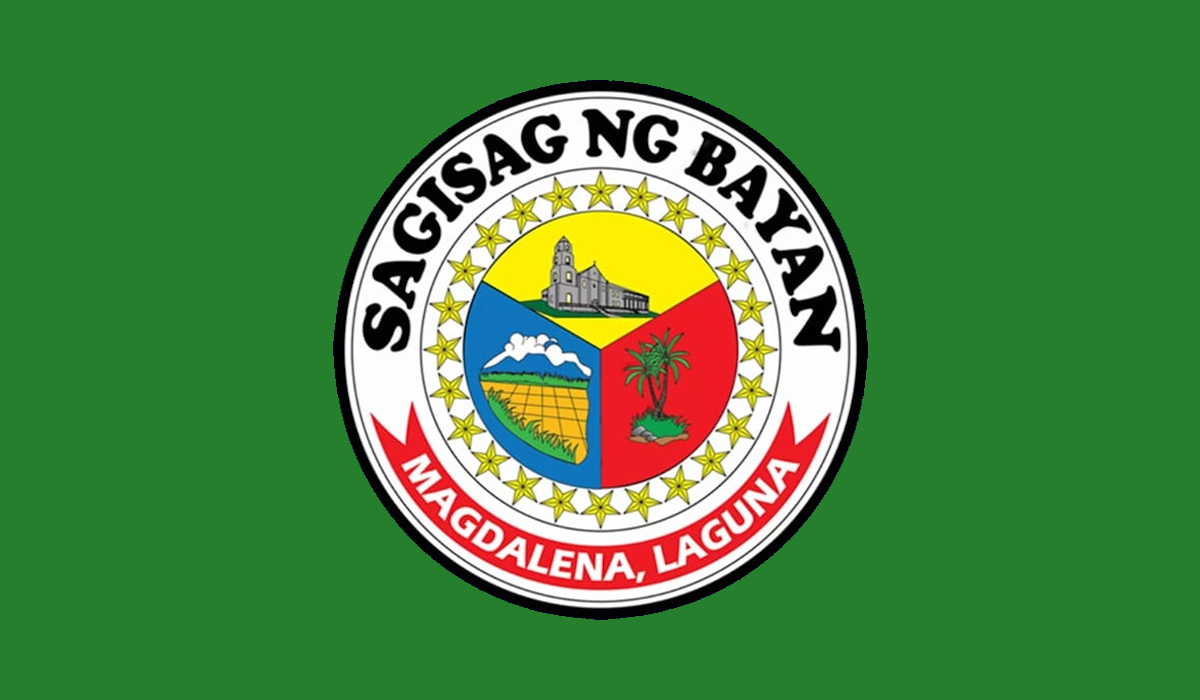
- Flag Seal
- Nickname: Bamboo Capital of Laguna
- Map of Laguna with Magdalena highlighted
- Interactive map of Magdalena
- Location within the Philippines
- Coordinates: 14°12′N 121°26′E
- Country: Philippines
- Region: Calabarzon
- Province: Laguna
- District: 4th district
- Founded: January 18, 1820
- Named for: Mary Magdalene
- Barangays: 24 (see Barangays)

Government
  - Type: Sangguniang Bayan
  - Mayor: Dario A. Lapada Jr.
  - Vice Mayor: Ron Vincent B. Zaguirre
  - Representative: Benjamin C. Agarao Jr.
  - Municipal Council: Members: Laurito B. Ibañez; Gina D. Obmerga; Ariel M. Ungco Jr.; John Lourence T. Ortega; Jeffrey M. Bucal; Paterno A. Sune Jr.; Oliver D. Burbos; Roberto R. Roguin
  - Electorate: 18,586 voters (2025)

Area
  - Total: 34.88 km^{2} (13.47 sq mi)
- Elevation: 112 m (367 ft)
- Highest elevation: 492 m (1,614 ft)
- Lowest elevation: 12 m (39 ft)

Population (2024 census)
  - Total: 28,131
  - Density: 806.5/km^{2} (2,089/sq mi)
  - Households: 6,731

Economy
  - Income class: 3rd municipal income class
  - Poverty incidence: 16.11% (2023)
  - Revenue: ₱ 154.9 million (2024)
  - Assets: ₱ 328.4 million (2024)
  - Expenditure: ₱ 67.02 million (2024)
  - Liabilities: ₱ 27.45 million (2024)

Service provider
  - Electricity: Manila Electric Company (Meralco)
- Time zone: UTC+8 (PST)
- ZIP code: 4007
- PSGC: 0403415000
- IDD : area code: +63 (0)49
- Native languages: Tagalog

Magdalena, officially the Municipality of Magdalena (Tagalog: Bayan ng Magdalena), is a municipality in the province of Laguna, Philippines. According to the 2024 census, it has a population of 28,131 people.

== History ==
Magdalena was formerly a barrio of Majayjay. A petition from the residents of the barrio for the creation of a new town was presented on September 15, 1819. It was proclaimed a new town by Governor General Don Mariano Fernández de Folgueras on January 18, 1820, and was originally named "Magdalena de Ambling". The town’s name is derived from its patron saint, Maria Magdalena, and the barrio of Ambling, where it was first established. Its first teniente alcalde or capitán—the highest political authority at the time—was Don Mauricio San Mateo.

A makeshift school was established in 1820, fulfilling one of the key requirements for the area’s recognition as a town. A municipal hall was also built, along with a small chapel, which later gave way to a larger church constructed in 1829. Built from stone and brick and funded through local contributions, the church was completed in 1861.

Further development followed with the construction of a concrete municipal hall and a church convent, which began in 1871 and was completed in 1884.

Emilio Jacinto Monument

The revolt against the Spaniards in this area started on November 13, 1896, when the male residents joined the revolutionaries from the province to form a bigger force. It was during one of the encounters that Emilio Jacinto was wounded and sought refuge at the church. Emilio Aguinaldo then proclaimed the first Philippine Republic and the Spaniards finally surrendered on September 1, 1898, and celebrations followed.

The arrival of the Americans, at the turn of the century, witnessed the evacuation of the townsfolk to the mountains for fear of being killed, later returned to the Poblacion seeing that the foreigners were well-intentioned.

The Americans enforced a new system of government. Election of government officials was conducted regularly. The first elected President Municipal was Don Victor Crisostomo. It was during this time that rebels, called tulisan, formed a force to oppose foreign rule and robbed the residents. On June 15, 1929, electricity was introduced in the municipality.

In 1945, Filipino troops of the 4th, 42nd, 43rd, 45th and 46th Infantry Division of the Philippine Commonwealth Army and 4th Constabulary Regiment of the Philippine Constabulary liberated Magdalena. The Japanese surrendered to the Filipino soldiers and guerrillas on May 25, 1945.

Post-World War II, Magdalena became a preferred shooting location for numerous films, including The Ravagers (also known as Only the Brave Know Hell),FPJ Films Like Pepeng Kaliwete and Sierra Madre, and the popular teleserye Wildflower.

== Geography ==
=== Barangays ===
Magdalena is politically subdivided into 24 barangays, as indicated below. Each barangay consists of puroks and some have sitios.

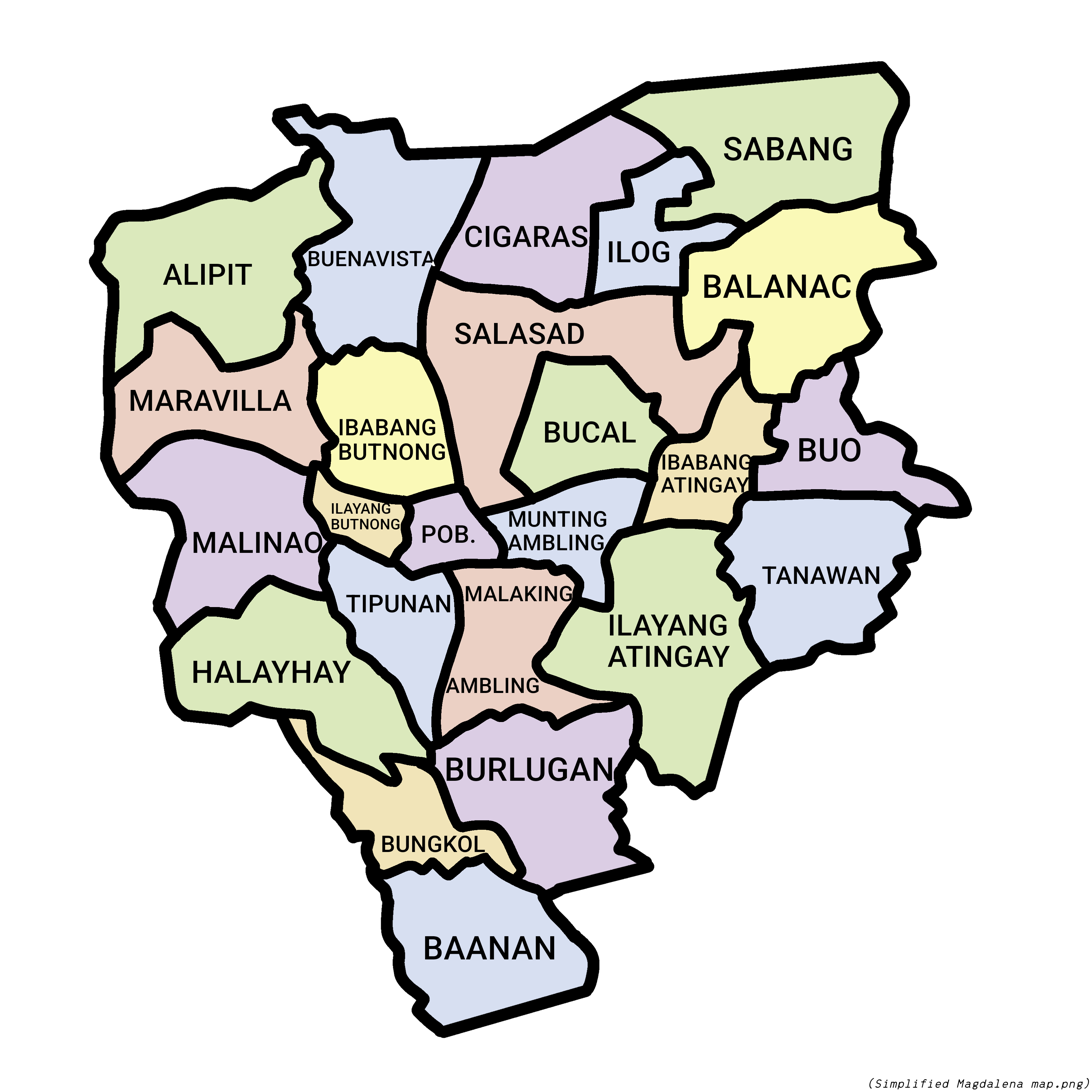
Barangay/local map of Magdalena

- Alipit
- Malaking Ambling
- Munting Ambling
- Baanan
- Balanac
- Bucal
- Buenavista
- Bungkol
- Buo
- Burlungan
- Cigaras
- Ibabang Atingay
- Ibabang Butnong
- Ilayang Atingay
- Ilayang Butnong
- Ilog
- Malinao
- Maravilla
- Poblacion
- Sabang
- Salasad
- Tanawan
- Tipunan
- Halayhayin

=== Climate ===
Climate data for Magdalena, Laguna
Month	Jan	Feb	Mar	Apr	May	Jun	Jul	Aug	Sep	Oct	Nov	Dec	Year
Mean daily maximum °C (°F)	26 (79)	27 (81)	28 (82)	31 (88)	31 (88)	30 (86)	29 (84)	29 (84)	29 (84)	29 (84)	28 (82)	26 (79)	29 (83)
Mean daily minimum °C (°F)	22 (72)	22 (72)	22 (72)	23 (73)	24 (75)	25 (77)	24 (75)	24 (75)	24 (75)	24 (75)	24 (75)	23 (73)	23 (74)
Average precipitation mm (inches)	58 (2.3)	41 (1.6)	32 (1.3)	29 (1.1)	91 (3.6)	143 (5.6)	181 (7.1)	162 (6.4)	172 (6.8)	164 (6.5)	113 (4.4)	121 (4.8)	1,307 (51.5)
Average rainy days	13.4	9.3	9.1	9.8	19.1	22.9	26.6	24.9	25.0	21.4	16.5	16.5	214.5
Source: Meteoblue

== Demographics ==
Population census of Magdalena
Year	Pop.	±% p.a.
1903	2,487	—
1918	3,032	+1.33%
1939	4,214	+1.58%
1948	3,733	−1.34%
1960	5,559	+3.37%
1970	7,650	+3.24%
1975	9,071	+3.48%
1980	10,433	+2.84%
1990	13,450	+2.57%
1995	15,927	+3.22%
2000	18,976	+3.83%
2007	20,204	+0.87%
2010	22,976	+4.79%
2015	25,266	+1.83%
2020	27,816	+2.04%
2024	28,131	+0.27%
Source: Philippine Statistics Authority

In the 2024 census, the population of Magdalena, Laguna, was 28,131 people, with a density of 810 inhabitants per square kilometer or 2,100 inhabitants per square mile.

== Economy ==
Poverty incidence of Magdalena (%)

Source: Philippine Statistics Authority

Municipal Hall

== Government ==
=== Elected officials ===
Magdalena municipal officials (2022–2025)
Name	Party
Mayor
Peter Bucal	Aksyon
Vice Mayor
Maximo Sotomayor	Aksyon
Councilors
Ali Badulis	Nacionalista
Rafael Bueno	Independent
Oliver Burbos	Independent
Grace Reodica	Independent
Paterno Sune, Jr.	Aksyon
Leo Togado	Independent
Ariel Ungco, Jr.	Lakas
Ron Zaguirre	Aksyon

== Culture ==
Town plaza with the St. Mary Magdalene Parish Church in the background

Magdalena has been dubbed by residents as the "Little Hollywood of Laguna" due to the town being used as a shooting location for multiple films and television series. Residents attribute the designation from when Fernando Poe Jr. started shooting at the town in the 1970s. A Walk of Fame has been established in the town's square to commemorate artists who visited Magdalena.

=== St. Mary Magdalene Parish Church ===
St. Mary Magdalene Church was constructed from 1851 to 1871 and made of stones and bricks with a sandstone façade. The church is located at the town center or plaza, just across the municipal town hall of Magdalena. In February 1898, after being wounded in a battle with the Spaniards at the Maimpis River, Philippine revolutionary hero Emilio Jacinto sought refuge in this church. His bloodstains were found on the floor of the church.

=== The Bahay Laguna ===
Bahay Laguna is a museum in Barangay Bungkol that houses the memorabilia of Felicisimo San Luis, who served as Governor of Laguna province for 33 years. During his time, he was known as the "Living Legend of Laguna." Aside from the memorabilia of then governor, Bahay Laguna showcases the specialty crafts and signature products of Laguna towns such as woodcarving of Paete and bottled preserved fruits of Alaminos.

The construction of Bahay Laguna was finished in December 1995. The Dr. Floro Brosas Foundation donated a piece of its land for this repository.

== Education ==
The Magdalena Schools District Office governs all educational institutions within the municipality. It oversees the management and operations of all private and public, from primary to secondary schools.

Ananias Laico Memorial Elementary School

=== Primary and elementary schools ===
- Ananias Laico Memorial Elementary School
- Angels Faith Christian School
- Balanac Elementary School
- Buenavista-Cigaras Elementary School
- Bungkol Elementary School
- Maravilla Elementary School
- Ricardo A. Pronove Elementary School

=== Secondary schools ===
- Banahaw Institute
- Buenavista National High School
- Magdalena National High School (Buenavista Annex)

=== Higher educational institutions ===
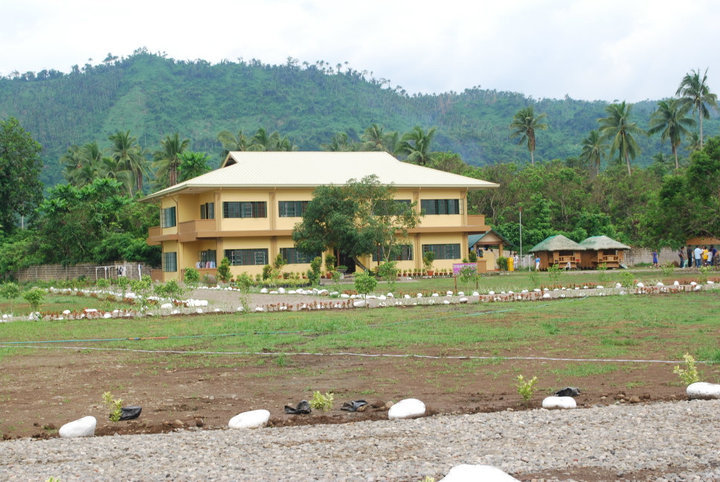
CCT-AMG Skilled Hands Technological College

- Alternative Learning System
- AMG Skilled Hands Technological College
- Laguna State Polytechnic University

== Infrastructure ==
=== Magdalena Water System ===
Magdalena successfully implemented the LGU Urban Water Supply and Sanitation Project (LGU-UWSSP). Previously, the municipality operated the Magdalena Waterworks, a water supply system which covered ten barangays. The main water source was the Oples Spring in nearby Liliw, supplying a volume of 4 liters (0.88 imp gal; 1.1 U.S. gal) per second to 1,097 service connections. Tariff was ₱8.00 for the first 10 cubic meters (350 cu ft) and an additional ₱1.00 in excess of 10 cubic meters.

However, the people were not keen on increasing the tariff, as the service was extremely poor. Believing that water is one of the basic services that the government should be able to provide to the people, the LGU consequently searched for a more permanent solution. Through the DILG and World Bank, the Local Government Unit Urban Water Supply and Sanitation Project (LGUUWSSP) was introduced to Magdalena officials. Through barangay meetings and consultations, the LGU water project and how it will help address their problems were explained to the people.

With the creation of the Municipal Water Board in August 2004, the water system was also constructed and became fully operational within a period of one year and six months. The Water Board is at present focused in the expansion of the service area to provide quality water service to the nearby barangays. Moreover, the board is continuously producing policies to help the project be a self-sufficient and profitable economic enterprise for the LGU.

With the successful implementation of the LGU-UWSSP, there have been marked improvements in the water supply and living conditions of the people in the community. All stakeholders in the municipality benefitted from the improved water system. From the previous practice of rationing water, a 24/7 supply has been established, contributing to the improved health of the citizenry.
