= 2025 Laguna local elections =

Part of 2025 Philippine general election

- May 12, 2025
- Gubernatorial election
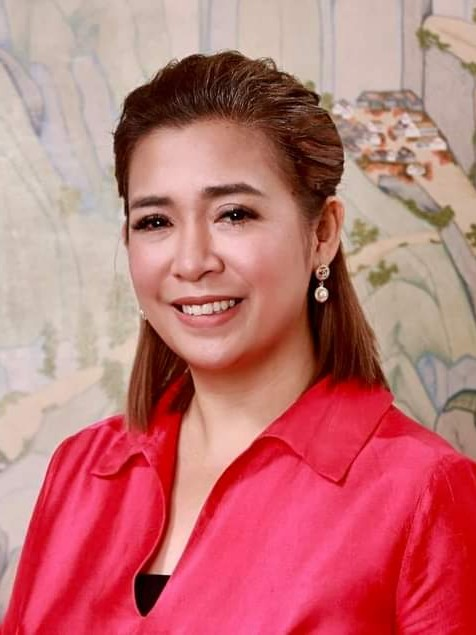

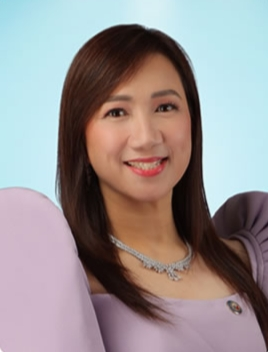

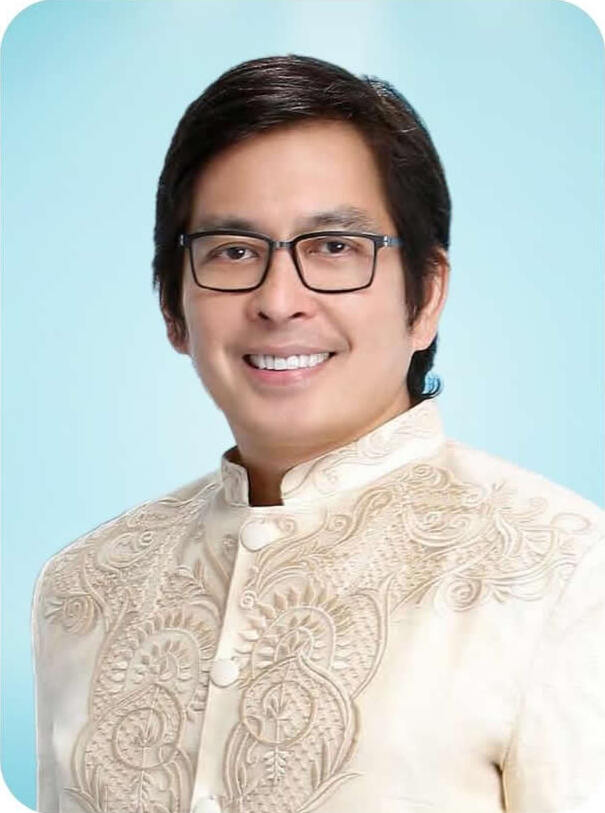

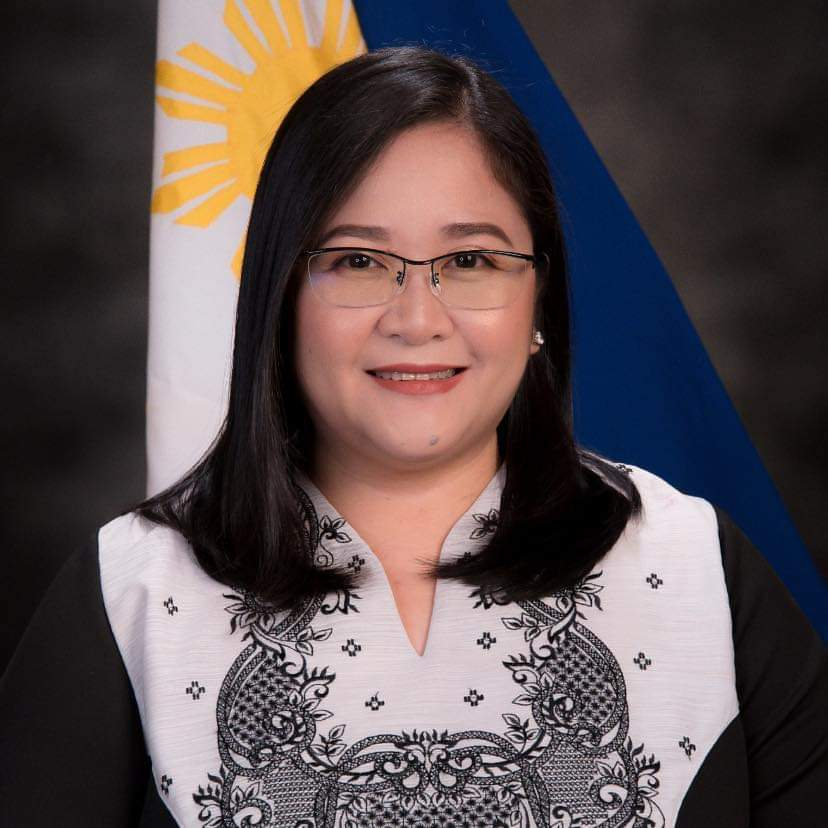
Candidate	Sol Aragones	Ruth Mariano-Hernandez
Party	AKAY	Lakas
Running mate	Peewee Perez	JM Carait
Popular vote	635,570	548,286
Percentage	39.80%	34.33%
Candidate	Danilo Fernandez	Katherine Agapay
Party	NUP	PFP
Running mate	Gem Castillo	Lorenzo Zuñiga
Popular vote	285,373	114,758
Percentage	17.87%	7.19%
- Gubernatorial election results by City and Municipality.
Governor before election
Ramil Hernandez
Lakas
Elected Governor
Sol Aragones
AKAY
- Vice gubernatorial election
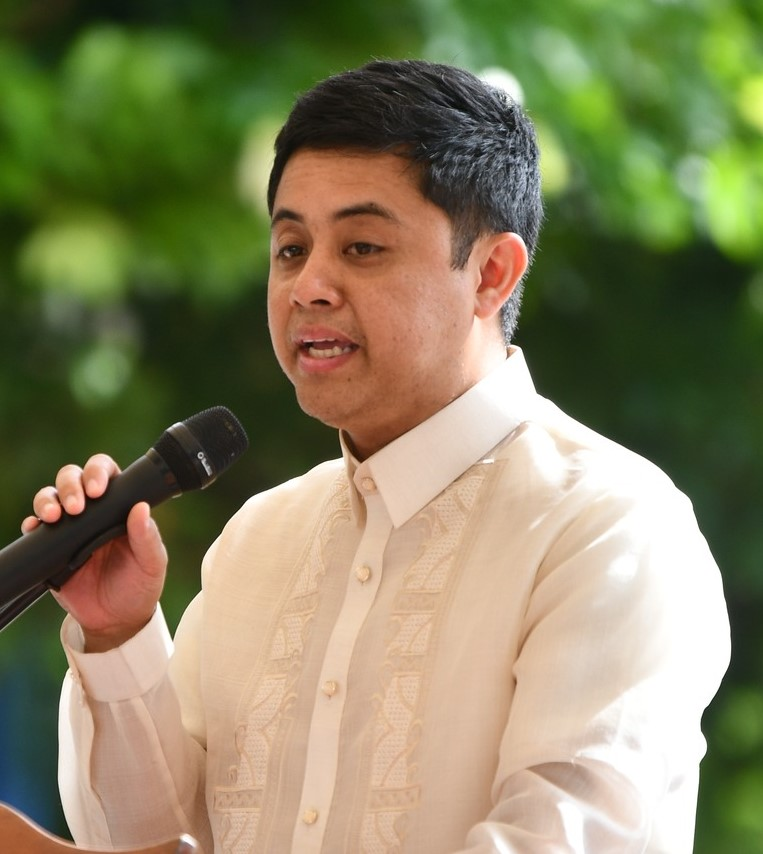

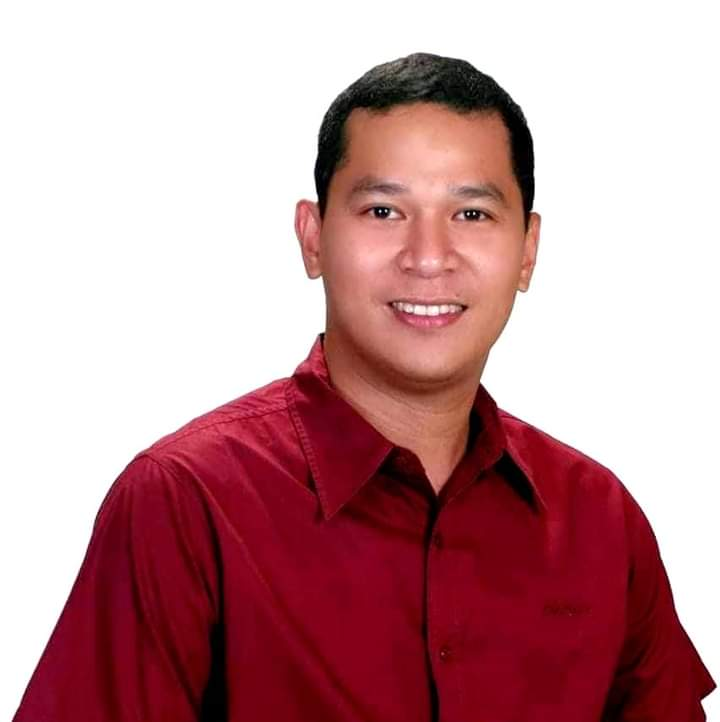
Candidate	JM Carait	Peewee Perez
Party	Lakas	AKAY
Popular vote	624,861	269,705
Percentage	42.96%	18.54%
Candidate	Jerico Ejercito	Gem Castillo
Party	Independent	NUP
Popular vote	265,760	224,355
Percentage	18.27%	15.42%
Vice Governor before election
Katherine Agapay
PFP
Elected Vice Governor
JM Carait
Lakas

Local elections were held in Laguna on May 12, 2025, as part of the 2025 Philippine general election. Voters will elect candidates for all local positions: a town mayor, vice mayor and town council, as well as members of the Sangguniang Panlalawigan, the vice governor, governor, and representatives for the four districts of Laguna, and the lone districts of Biñan, Calamba, and Santa Rosa.

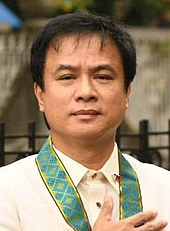
Incumbent Governor Ramil Hernandez is term-limited.

== Gubernatorial election ==
The incumbent governor is Ramil Hernandez, who was reelected for a third consecutive term in 2022, defeating his main challenger Representative Sol Aragones with 57.60% of the vote. Hernandez is barred from seeking reelection due to term limits.

Candidates for the gubernatorial election include Sol Aragones, incumbent Vice Governor Katherine Agapay, incumbent Representative Dan Fernandez, and incumbent Representative Ruth Hernandez, wife of Governor Hernandez.

An aspirant for the governor of Laguna, Jemma “Rose” Villanueva Hernandez, was identified as a nuisance candidate on December 11.

=== Results ===
2025 Laguna gubernatorial election
Candidate	Party	Votes	%
Sol Aragones	Akay National Political Party	635,570	39.80
Ruth Hernandez	Lakas–CMD	548,286	34.33
Dan Fernandez	National Unity Party	285,373	17.87
Katherine Agapay	Partido Federal ng Pilipinas	114,758	7.19
Alexander Tolentino	Independent	6,418	0.40
Caloy Reyes	Independent	4,508	0.28
Koyang Noli Samia	Independent	2,063	0.13
Total		1,596,976	100.00
Valid votes		1,596,976	93.91
Invalid/blank votes		103,653	6.09
Total votes		1,700,629	100.00
Registered voters/turnout		2,140,124	79.46
AKAY gain from Lakas			
Source: Commission on Elections

==== Per City/Municipality ====
City/Municipality	Sol Aragones		Ruth Hernandez		Dan Fernandez		Katherine Agapay		Others	
City/Municipality	Votes	%	Votes	%	Votes	%	Votes	%	Votes	%
Alaminos	15,025	54.54	5,664	20.56	3,442	12.50	3,266	11.86	150	0.54
Bay	7,996	22.32	22,827	63.73	3,258	9.10	1,577	4.40	161	0.45
Biñan	70,007	43.82	36,093	22.59	40,077	25.09	11,197	7.01	2,388	1.49
Cabuyao	36,451	19.47	89,674	47.90	55,001	29.38	5,128	2.74	964	0.51
Calamba	78,186	31.19	135,174	53.92	24,407	9.74	10,680	4.26	2,240	0.89
Calauan	20,684	52.28	13,378	33.81	2,809	7.10	2,480	6.27	213	0.54
Cavinti	5,113	35.62	4,197	29.24	2,900	20.20	2,042	14.22	104	0.72
Famy	3,466	35.16	3,285	33.32	1,885	19.12	1,155	11.72	67	0.68
Kalayaan	4,321	34.28	4,000	31.73	2,131	16.91	2,032	16.12	121	0.96
Liliw	10,451	50.16	6,581	31.59	1,736	8.33	2,003	9.61	63	0.30
Los Baños	12,191	20.66	37,439	63.45	5,909	10.01	3,154	5.35	310	0.53
Luisiana	4,923	40.38	3,942	32.33	2,225	18.25	1,058	8.68	45	0.37
Lumban	6,639	37.03	5,576	31.11	3,682	20.55	1,927	10.75	102	0.57
Mabitac	3,603	32.41	3,089	27.78	3.057	27.49	1,216	10.93	154	1.39
Magdalena	5,353	36.02	4,683	31.52	2,627	17.68	2,114	14.22	85	0.57
Majayjay	6,866	41.35	5,186	31.23	2,923	17.61	1,519	9.15	112	0.67
Nagcarlan	20,021	53.41	8,568	22.86	2,982	7.96	5,722	15.27	188	0.50
Paete	5,492	41.52	3,893	29.43	1,952	14.76	1,789	13.53	100	0.76
Pagsanjan	11,680	49.70	4,766	20.28	5,247	22.33	1,712	7.29	100	0.43
Pakil	3,630	29.03	4,542	36.33	3,238	25.90	1,000	8.00	95	0.76
Pangil	5,082	40.38	3,384	26.89	2,674	21.25	1,338	10.63	107	0.85
Pila	13,304	46.61	7,968	27.93	3,739	13.11	3,377	11.84	149	0.52
Rizal	6,034	56.43	2,660	24.87	1,063	9.94	912	8.53	24	0.22
San Pablo	92,213	66.64	18,289	13.22	9,848	7.12	17,395	12.57	638	0.46
San Pedro	57,406	43.21	36,961	27.82	26,907	20.25	9,919	7.47	1,655	1.25
Santa Cruz	30,676	48.09	19,088	29.92	8,181	12.82	5,407	8.48	434	0.68
Santa Maria	4,338	23.28	5,079	27.26	5,549	29.78	3,527	18.93	141	0.76
Santa Rosa	76,100	43.43	38,594	22.03	52,967	30.23	5,761	3.29	1,806	1.03
Siniloan	7,200	35.84	7,017	34.93	3,184	15.85	2,539	12.64	151	0.75
Victoria	11,119	49.27	6,689	29.60	2,827	12.53	1,812	8.03	122	0.54
TOTAL	635,570	39.80	548,286	33.33	285,373	17.87	114,758	7.19	12.989	0.81

== Vice gubernatorial election ==
The incumbent vice governor is Katherine Agapay, who was elected for a third consecutive term in 2022, defeating her main challenger, actor Jericho Ejercito, with 60.17% of the vote. Agapay is barred from seeking reelection due to term limits.

On October 7, 2024, former Representative Sol Aragones filed for candidacy, with Laguna Provincial Board Member Peewee Perez as her running mate for vice governor. In June 2024, Laguna Provincial Board Member JM Carait declared his candidacy for vice governor, running alongside Representative Ruth Hernandez. In August 2024, actress-singer Gem Castillo, wife of San Pablo Mayor Vicente Amante, confirmed that she would be the running mate of Representative Dan Fernandez in his bid for governor. Castillo and Amante had filed their candidacy on October 6, 2024.

=== Results ===
2025 Laguna vice gubernatorial election
Candidate	Party	Votes	%
JM Carait	Lakas–CMD	624,861	42.96
Peewee Perez	Akay National Political Party	269,705	18.54
Jorge Jerico Ejercito	Independent	265,760	18.27
Gem Castillo	National Unity Party	224,355	15.42
Lorenzo Zuñiga	Partido Federal ng Pilipinas	52,905	3.64
Mary Buera	Independent	17,002	1.17
Total		1,454,588	100.00
Valid votes		1,454,588	85.53
Invalid/blank votes		246,041	14.47
Total votes		1,700,629	100.00
Registered voters/turnout		2,140,124	79.46
Lakas gain from PFP			
Source: Commission on Elections

== Provincial Board election ==
Beginning this election, two members will be elected from the 2nd district and each of the cities of Biñan, Calamba, San Pedro, and Santa Rosa as they constitute a lone legislative district, with San Pedro being the only city remaining under the 1st district of Laguna. This change will increase the total number of elected members to 14.

=== First district ===
- Cities: San Pedro

Incumbent JM Carait is term-limited and is barred for running for a fourth consecutive term. Incumbents Danzel Rafter Fernandez and Wilfredo Bejasa Jr. are eligible for running for reelection. Bejasa Jr. will seek reelection but this time as a member from Biñan, while Fernandez has opted to run for the congressional seat of Santa Rosa instead. Running for the position are incumbent San Pedro city councilor Bernadeth Olivares and former first city vice mayor Raffy Campos.

Laguna Provincial Board election
Party	Candidate	Votes	%
KANP	Bernadeth Olivares	57,137	25.31
NUP	Raffy Campos	47,300	20.95
PFP	Jeamie Salvatierra	42,923	19.01
AKAY	Brad Lon-lon Ambayec	41,768	18.50
NUP	Carlo Almoro	36,624	16.22
Total votes		225,752	100

=== Second district ===
- Cities: Cabuyao
- Municipalities: Bay, Los Baños

Seats have opened up in this election. Incumbents Christian Niño Lajara and Peewee Perez have decided to run in different elective posts in Laguna. Incumbent Tito Fortunato Caringal II is eligible for running for reelection. Former board member Ninoy Bagnes sought the position once again after losing in the 2022 elections.

2025 Laguna 2nd District Provincial Board Election
Party	Candidate	Votes	%
NUP	Tito Fortunato Caringal II	119,677	28.00%
NUP	Ninoy Bagnes	107,170	25.07%
Lakas–CMD	Pas Irma Dela Cruz	85,335	19.96%
AKAY	Christian Aguillo	55,968	13.09%
PFP	Bim Belarmino	23,005	5.38%
Total Valid Votes		391,155	91.50%

=== Third District ===
- City: San Pablo
- Municipalities: Alaminos, Calauan, Liliw. Nagcarlan, Rizal, Victoria

Incumbent Alejandro Yu is term-limited and is barred from running for a fourth term. Incumbent Karla Monica Adajar-Lajara is eligible for reelection. Angelica Jones, who previously served from 2010 to 2016 and 2019 to 2022, ran for the position once anew. Also running for the position are Calauan mayor Roseller Caratihan's son, Charles Caratihan and independent candidates Elma Reyes, Icel Flores, and Juanita Venzuela.

2025 Laguna 3rd District Provincial Board Election
Party	Candidate	Votes	%
Lakas–CMD	Karla Monica Adajar	157,294	36.80%
PFP	Angelica Jones	127,701	29.87%
Lakas–CMD	Charles Caratihan	122,114	28.57%
Independent	Elma Reyes	7,745	1.81%
Independent	Icel Flores	7,165	1.68%
Independent	Juanita Venzuela	5,456	1.28%
Total Valid Votes		427,475	100.00%

=== Fourth district ===
- Municipalities: Cavinti, Famy, Kalayaan, Luisiana, Lumban, Mabitac, Magdalena, Majayjay, Paete, Pagsanjan, Pakil, Pangil, Pila, Santa Cruz, Santa Maria, Siniloan

Both incumbents are eligible for re-election. Benjo Agarao is running for mayor of Santa Cruz while Francis Joseph "Milo" San Luis did not seek for re-election or any political position in the province. Rain-Ann San Luis, who previously served from 2013 to 2022 is running once anew for the position. Incumbent 4th district representative Jam Agarao, the brother of Benjo Agarao, is seeking for the position for the second time. Also running for the position are Laguna Action Center head Rommel Palacol and first timer Kenneth Ragaza.

2025 Fourth District Laguna Provincial Board Election
Party	Candidate	Votes	%
PFP	Jam Agarao	184,487	40.26
NUP	Rai-Ann San Luis	109,737	23.94
NUP	Kenneth Ragaza	52,621	11.48
Lakas	Rommel Palacol	39,865	8.70
Independent	Maria Guadalupe Ejercito	33,280	7.26
Lakas	Archee Lopez	20,182	4.40
Independent	Atty. Eli Gojas	18,122	3.95
Total votes		458,294	100

=== Biñan ===
- Cities: Biñan

Biñan Sangguniang Panlalawigan election
Party	Candidate	Votes	%
Lakas	Wilfredo Bejasa Jr. (Incumbent)	57,414	21.40
Lakas	Jigcy Pecaña	52,661	19.63
NUP	Jay Souza	43,750	16.31
NUP	Alvin Garcia	37,216	13.87
PFP	Gab Alatiit	34,988	13.04
AKAY	Theresa Yatco Paron	28,789	10.73
Independent	Engr. JR Asiño	10,965	4.09
Independent	Izel Sordilla	2,526	0.94
Total votes		268,309	100

=== Calamba ===
- Cities: Calamba

Calamba Sangguniang Panlalawigan election
Party	Candidate	Votes	%
Lakas	Princess Lajara	116,721	27.99
Lakas	Dyan Espiridion	115,282	27.65
Nacionalista	Ronald Cardema	62,798	15.06
Independent	Cyren Catindig	49,764	11.93
Aksyon	Vinz Hizon	22,096	5.30
PFP	Bokalino Sarmiento	21,131	5.07
Independent	Batang Majanda Manaig	18,412	4.42
NUP	Emong Larroza	5,449	1.31
Independent	Kuya Jong Ibañez	2,318	0.56
Independent	Noel Talahib Rivera	2,194	0.53
Independent	Voltage Demiar	821	0.20
Total votes		416,986	100

=== Santa Rosa ===
- Cities: Santa Rosa

Santa Rosa Sangguniang Panlalawigan election
Party	Candidate	Votes	%
NPC	Arnel Gomez	93,977	37.68
NUP	Peping Cartaño	58,297	23.37
Independent	Eric Puzon	56,923	22.82
Lakas	Renz Mayano	33,980	13.62
PFP	John Masaredo	6,260	2.51
Total votes		249,437	100

== Congressional elections ==
=== First District (2022 - Present) ===
Locality: San Pedro (Component City)

Incumbent Representative Ann Matibag is eligible for reelection. She is running unopposed.

2025 Philippine House of Representatives election in the Laguna's 1st congressional district
Party	Candidate	Votes	%
Lakas	Ann Matibag (Incumbent)	111,214	100
Total votes		111,214	100
Lakas hold			

=== Second District (2019 - Present) ===
Localities: Bay, Cabuyao and Los Baños

Incumbent Representative Ruth Hernandez is eligible for reelection, but chose to run for governor instead. She will be switching places with her husband, term-limited governor Ramil Hernandez.

2025 Philippine House of Representatives election in Laguna's 2nd district
Party	Candidate	Votes	%
Lakas	Ramil Hernandez	142,815	51.16
NUP	Dondon Richard Hain	136,353	48.84
Total votes		279,168	100
Lakas hold			

=== Third District (1987 - Present) ===
Incumbent Representative Loreto Amante is eligible for reelection.

2025 Philippine House of Representatives election in Laguna 3rd district
Party	Candidate	Votes	%
Lakas	Loreto Amante (Incumbent)	238,140	86.38
RP	Empelight Empemano	28,730	10.42
Independent	Ronnie Masirag	4,697	1.70
Independent	Ocha Mamaril	4,106	1.49
Total votes		275,673	100
Lakas hold			

=== Fourth district ===
Incumbent representative Jam Agarao is eligible for re-election, but chose to contest for the provincial board member position to give way for the return of her father, former congressman Benjamin Agarao Jr. to the House of Representatives. Pakil Mayor Vincent Soriano withdrew from the congressional race just a month after filing his candidacy. Former Santa Maria Mayor Atty. Tony Carolino is seeking the position for the fourth time.

Party	Candidate	Votes	%
PFP	Benjamin Agarao Jr.	150,553	50.06%
NUP	Antonio Carolino	150,217	49.94%
Total valid votes		300,770	100.00%
Invalid or blank votes		151,204	—
Electorate		451,974	—
PFP hold			

=== Biñan at-large (2015 - Present) ===
Incumbent Representative Len Alonte is term-limited. Incumbent City Mayor Walfredo Dimaguila Jr. is running for the congressional seat against businessman Michael Yatco.

2025 Philippine House of Representatives election in the Biñan's lone district
Party	Candidate	Votes	%
Lakas	Arman Dimaguila	102,049	62.62
PFP	Mike Yatco	60,922	37.38
Total votes		162,971	100
Lakas hold			

=== Calamba at-large ===
Incumbent Representative Cha Hernandez seeks re-election for another term. Her opponents in this election are former congressman Jun Chipeco, incumbent City Councilor Saturnino Lajara, and political newcomer Gino Salom.

2025 Philippine House of Representatives election in the Calamba's lone district
Party	Candidate	Votes	%
Lakas	Charisse Ann Hernandez (Incumbent)	167,282	66.42
Nacionalista	Jun Chipeco	39,293	15.60
PFP	Turne Lajara	38,926	15.46
AKAY	Eugiene Salom	6,356	2.52
Total votes		251,857	100
Lakas hold			

=== Santa Rosa at-large ===
Incumbent Representative Dan Fernandez is eligible for re-election, but chose to run for governor instead. His son Provincial Board Member Danzel Fernandez is running for the congressional seat against City Councilors Roy Gonzales and Sonia Algabre.

2025 Philippine House of Representatives election in the Santa Rosa's lone district
Party	Candidate	Votes	%
Lakas	Roy Gonzales	86,177	49.36
NUP	Danzel Fernandez	60,441	34.62
AKAY	Sonia Algabre	27,958	16.01
Total votes		174,576	100
Lakas gain from NUP			

== City and municipal elections ==
All cities and municipalities of Laguna will elect a mayor and a vice-mayor this election. The candidates for mayor and vice mayor with the highest number of votes wins the seat; they are voted separately, therefore, they may be of different parties when elected. Below is the list of mayoralty candidates of each city and municipalities per district.

=== First district ===
- Cities: San Pedro

==== San Pedro ====
Incumbent Mayor Art Joseph Francis Mercado is eligible for re-election, and is seeking for a second term.

2025 San Pedro mayoral election
Party	Candidate	Votes	%
Lakas	Art Joseph Francis Mercado (Incumbent)	121,552	87.54
Independent	Neknek Gilbuena	17,308	12.46
Total votes		138,860	100
Lakas hold			

2025 San Pedro vice mayoral election
Party	Candidate	Votes	%
NUP	Niña Almoro	73,436	54.50
Lakas	Ina Olivarez	61,313	45.50
Total votes		134,749	100
NUP gain from Lakas			

=== Second district ===
- Cities: Cabuyao
- Municipalities: Bay, Los Baños

==== Cabuyao ====
Incumbent Mayor Dennis Felipe Hain is running for reelection.

2025 Cabuyao mayoral election
Party	Candidate	Votes	%
NUP	Dennis Felipe Hain (Incumbent)	117,283	63.08
Independent	Atty. Leif Opiña	68,636	36.92
Total votes		185,919	100
NUP hold			

2025 Cabuyao vice mayoral election
Party	Candidate	Votes	%
NUP	Junjun Batallones	103,696	57.10
Lakas	Mel Gecolea	77,906	42.90
Total votes		181,602	100
NUP gain from Lakas			

==== Bay ====
Incumbent Mayor Jose Padrid is running for reelection. His opponent is actor Emilio Garcia.

2025 Bay mayoral election
Party	Candidate	Votes	%
Lakas	Jose Padrid (Incumbent)	18,926	51.87
Independent	John Paul Villegas	10,482	28.73
Independent	Emilio Garcia	3,642	9.98
PFP	Edwin Ramos	3,438	9.42
Total votes		36,488	100
Lakas hold			

2025 Bay vice mayoral election
Party	Candidate	Votes	%
Lakas	Sir Dabang Punzalan	18,991	53.89
Independent	Chester Ramos	13,471	38.23
Independent	Atty. Aldrin Panopio	2,777	7.88
Total votes		35,239	100
Lakas gain from Independent			

==== Los Baños ====
Incumbent Mayor Anthony Genuino is eligible for reelection.

2025 Los Baños mayoral election
Party	Candidate	Votes	%
Lakas	Neil Andrew Nocon	23,024	38.04
Bigkis	Anthony Genuino (Incumbent)	18,356	30.33
Independent	Baby Sumangil	17,960	29.68
Independent	Bobit Meneses	1,182	1.95
Total votes		60,522	100
Lakas gain from Bigkis			

2025 Los Baños vice mayoral election
Party	Candidate	Votes	%
Independent	Marlo PJ Alipon	22,888	39.72
Bigkis	Jonsi Siytiap	22,434	38.93
Lakas	Gob Ian Kalaw	12,301	21.35
Total votes		57,623	100
Independent hold			

=== Third district ===
- City: San Pablo
- Municipalities: Alaminos, Calauan, Liliw, Nagcarlan, Rizal, Victoria

==== San Pablo ====
Incumbent Mayor Vicente Amante is eligible for reelection, running against Barangay San Francisco Councilor Arcadio “Najie” Gapangada Jr. This is a major loss for the Amantes as they will lose their grip on the executive office in San Pablo City that they hold for over two decades.

San Pablo City Mayoral election
Party	Candidate	Votes	%
RP	Arcadio Gapangada Jr.	70,822	51.63
Nacionalista	Vicente Amante (Incumbent)	66,352	48.37
Total votes		137,174	100
RP gain from Nacionalista			

San Pablo City vice mayoral election
Party	Candidate	Votes	%
Nacionalista	Justin Colago (Incumbent)	66,289	51.70
RP	Mark Anthony Alimagno	61,936	48.30
Total votes		128,225	100
Nacionalista hold			

==== Alaminos ====
Incumbent Mayor Glenn Flores is eligible for reelection.

Alaminos Mayoral election
Party	Candidate	Votes	%
PFP	Eric Lopez	14,765	50.21
Lakas	Glenn Flores (Incumbent)	12,316	41.88
AKAY	Baby Faylona	2,278	7.75
Independent	Val Reyes	47	0.16
Total votes		29,406	100
PFP gain from Lakas			

Alaminos vice mayoral election
Party	Candidate	Votes	%
PFP	Victor Mitra (Incumbent)	15,873	55.18
NUP	Janis Angela Ilagan	10,725	37.28
AKAY	George Abrigo	2,169	7.54
Total votes		28,767	100
PFP hold			

==== Calauan ====
Incumbent Mayor Roseller Caratihan is eligible for reelection, seeking a second term against former mayor George Berris.

Calauan Mayoral election
Party	Candidate	Votes	%
Lakas	Roseller Caratihan (Incumbent)	38,463	94.46
Independent	George Berris	2,256	5.54
Total votes		40,719	100
Lakas hold			

Calauan vice mayoral election
Party	Candidate	Votes	%
Lakas	Allan Jun Sanchez (Incumbent)	29,452	76.45
Independent	Amty Sanchez	9,072	23.55
Total votes		38,524	100%
Lakas hold			

==== Liliw ====
Incumbent Mayor Ildefonso Monleon is eligible for reelection, seeking a second term against former ally, former Mayor, and incumbent Vice Mayor Eric Sulibit.

Liliw Mayoral election
Party	Candidate	Votes	%
Lakas	Ildefonso Monleon (Incumbent)	15,254	70.06
NUP	Ericson Sulibit	6,520	29.94
Total votes		21,774	100
Lakas hold			

Liliw vice mayoral election
Party	Candidate	Votes	%
PFP	Arnold Montesines	13,657	65.06
NUP	Grajon Obico	7,336	34.94
Total votes		20,993	100
PFP gain from NUP			

==== Nagcarlan ====
Incumbent Mayor Elmor Vita is eligible for reelection, seeking a second term against former mayor and businesswoman Lourdes "Ody" Arcasetas, and municipal councilors Roberto Tajaran and Teddy Coroza. This election marks Ody's third defeat in the mayoral race.

Nagcarlan mayoral election
Party	Candidate	Votes	%
Lakas	Elmor Vita (Incumbent)	17,762	45.74
NUP	Lourdes Arcasetas	16,429	42.31
AKAY	Roberto Tajaran	3,648	9.39
Independent	Teddy Coroza	991	2.55
Total votes		38,830	100
Lakas hold			

Incumbent Vice Mayor Rexon Arevalo is eligible for reelection. seeking a third and final term as vice mayor against a term-limited municipal councilor Rey Comendador.

Nagcarlan vice mayoral election
Party	Candidate	Votes	%
Lakas	Rexon Arevalo (Incumbent)	25,750	70.07
NUP	Rey Comendador	10,999	29.93
Total votes		36,749	100
Lakas hold			

==== Rizal ====
Incumbent Mayor Vener Muñoz is eligible for reelection, seeking a third and final term unopposed.

Rizal mayoral election
Party	Candidate	Votes	%
Lakas	Vener Muñoz	9 135	100
Total votes		9,135	100
Lakas hold			

Rizal vice mayoral election
Party	Candidate	Votes	%
AKAY	Antonino Aurelio	8,318	100
Total votes		8,318	100
AKAY hold			

==== Victoria ====
Incumbent Mayor Dwight Kampitan is eligible for reelection.

Victoria Mayoral election
Party	Candidate	Votes	%
Lakas	Dwight Kampitan (Incumbent)	8,833	37.15
NUP	Boboy Maristela	7,834	32.95
PFP	Corazon Almeida	7,107	29.89
Total votes		23,774	100
Lakas hold			

Victoria vice mayoral election
Party	Candidate	Votes	%
Lakas	RJ Kampitan (Incumbent)	10,190	44.54
AKAY	Leoncio Fajardo	6,790	29.68
NUP	Fe Tope	5,896	25.77
Total votes		22,876	100
Lakas hold			

=== Fourth district ===
- Municipalities: Cavinti, Famy, Kalayaan, Luisiana, Lumban, Mabitac, Magdalena, Majayjay, Paete, Pagsanjan, Pakil, Pangil, Pila, Santa Cruz, Santa Maria, Siniloan

==== Cavinti ====
Incumbent Mayor Arrantlee Arroyo is eligible for reelection.

Cavinti Mayoral election
Party	Candidate	Votes	%
PFP	Arrantlee Arroyo	12,022	80.34
Independent	Bethoven dela Torre	2,031	13.57
Lakas	Bingo Matta	911	6.09
Total votes		14,964	100
PFP hold			

Cavinti vice mayoral election
Party	Candidate	Votes	%
PFP	Milbert Oliveros	9,306	62.79
Lakas	Jimmy Jose Oliveros	5,514	37.21
Total votes		14,820	100
PFP hold			

==== Famy ====
Incumbent Mayor Lorenzo Rellosa is eligible for reelection.

Famy Mayoral election
Party	Candidate	Votes	%
PFP	Lorenzo Rellosa	5,713	55.50
Lakas	Charlie Llamas	4,580	44.50
Total votes		10,293	100
PFP hold			

Famy vice mayoral election
Party	Candidate	Votes	%
PFP	Sir Freddie Valois	5,690	55.45
Independent	Florence Lameyra	4,571	44.55
Total votes		10,261	100
PFP hold			

==== Kalayaan ====
Incumbent Mayor Sandy Laganapan is eligible for reelection.

Kalayaan Mayoral election
Party	Candidate	Votes	%
PFP	Sandy Laganapan	9,501	73.51
Lakas	Russel Laganas	3,423	26.49
Total votes		12,924	100
PFP hold			

Kalayaan vice mayoral election
Party	Candidate	Votes	%
PFP	Christopher Ramiro	7,125	55.32
AKAY	Marlon Laganas	5,755	44.68
Total votes		12,880	100
PFP hold			

==== Luisiana ====
Incumbent Mayor Jomapher "Mapher" Alvarez is eligible for reelection, his two main opponents are Former Mayor Nestor Rondilla and Former Vice Mayor Reynaldo "Umbay" Pedron.

Luisiana mayoral election
Party	Candidate	Votes	%
PFP	Mapher Alvarez	8,023	64.66
Independent	Nestor Rondilla	4,156	33.49
Independent	Umbay Pedron	229	1.85
Total votes		12,408	100
PFP hold			

Incumbent Vice Mayor Luibic Jacob is eligible for reelection, His Main Opponent is Engineer Jonieces Acaylar who run for Mayor in 2022 but lost placing 2nd.

Luisiana vice mayoral election
Party	Candidate	Votes	%
Lakas	Jonieces Acaylar	6,496	52.13
AKAY	Luibic Jacob	5,964	47.87
Total votes		12,460	100
Lakas gain from AKAY			

Incumbent Mayor Mapher Alvarez Made her coalition named "Pamilya Bagong Umaga" His Candidates are: Hans Rondilla (NUP) Romnick Racoma (AKAY) Elaine Teope (AKBAYAN) Kap. Marlon Oblinida (PFP) Bisaya Abrejera (AKAY) Marvin Padayhag (AKAY) Ace Reveche-Cortez (NUP) Patrick Taguilso (NUP)

While, Engr. Jonieces Acaylar made his own Coalition Also named "We Love Luisiana" His Candidates Are: Oyong Suario (Lakas) Raya Fe Arca (Lakas) Junar Romulo (Lakas) Andy Uy (Lakas) Jerry Noceja (Lakas) Anton Estrabo (Lakas) Alex Paduada (Ind= Guess Candidate)

Luisiana Sangguniang Bayan election
Party	Candidate	Votes	%
NUP	Hans Christian Rondilla	7,418	9.71
AKAY	Romnick Racoma	6,835	8.95
Akbayan	Elaine Teope	6,477	8.48
Lakas	Oyong Suario	6,213	8.13
PFP	Kap. Marlon Oblinida	5,665	7.42
AKAY	Bisaya Abrejera	5,639	7.38
AKAY	Marvin Padayhag	5,203	6.81
Lakas	Raya Fe Arca	4,591	6.01
Lakas	Junar Romulo	4,576	5.99
NUP	Reveche Cortez	4,487	5.87
Lakas	Andy Uy	4,423	5.79
Lakas	Jheboy Noceja	4,314	5.65
NUP	Patrick Taguilaso	3,827	5.01
Lakas	Anthony Estrabo	3,814	4.99
Independent	Alexander Paduada	2,906	3.80
Total votes		76,388	100

==== Lumban ====
Incumbent Mayor Rolan Ubatay is ineligible for reelection.

Lumban Mayoral election
Party	Candidate	Votes	%
PFP	Belen Raga	9,430	49.98
Lakas	Atty. Jeromme Lacbay	5,177	27.44
PDP–Laban	Loveuall Samonte	4,261	22.58
Total votes		18,868	100
PFP hold			

Lumban vice mayoral election
Party	Candidate	Votes	%
PFP	Ernie Baldovino	7,066	38.16
NUP	Rhoda Rabie	5,645	30.49
Lakas	Roma Tablico	4,752	25.66
PDP–Laban	Noel Macalagay	1,053	5.69
Total votes		18,516	100
PFP hold			

==== Mabitac ====
Incumbent Mayor Alberto Reyes is eligible for reelection.

Mabitac Mayoral election
Party	Candidate	Votes	%
PFP	Al Reyes	6,403	54.06
NUP	Gerardo Consignado	5,371	45.35
Independent	Divina Tolentino	70	0.59
Total votes		11,844	100
PFP hold			

Mabitac vice mayoral election
Party	Candidate	Votes	%
PFP	Onie Sana	7,906	100
Total votes		7,906	100
PFP hold			

==== Magdalena ====
Incumbent Mayor Pedro Bucal is eligible for reelection, seeking a second term.

Magdalena Mayoral election
Party	Candidate	Votes	%
Lakas	Dario Lapada Jr.	5,724	36.40
PFP	Cesar Articona	5,655	35.96
NUP	Peter Bucal	4,348	27.65
Total votes		15,727	100
Lakas gain from NUP			

Magdalena vice mayoral election
Party	Candidate	Votes	%
NUP	Ron Zaguirre	6,537	43.14
Lakas	Maximo Sotomayor	5,712	37.70
PFP	Henry Chua	2,903	19.16
Total votes		15,152	100
NUP gain from Lakas			

==== Majayjay ====
Incumbent Mayor Romeo Amorado is eligible for reelection, seeking a second term against former Mayor Carlo Invinzor Clado of AKAY and former Vice Mayor Lauro Mentilla of NUP (Amorado's former ally), and Independent Antonio Esmaquel Jr. In November 2024, former Mayor Carlo Invinzor Clado died due to illness, his mother Ellen Clado was named as his substitute.

Majayjay mayoral election
Party	Candidate	Votes	%
Lakas	Romeo Amorado	10,264	59.08
NUP	Larry Mentilla	4,323	24.88
AKAY	Ellen Clado	2,344	13.49
Independent	Allan Esmaquel	441	2.54
Total votes		17,372	100
Lakas hold			

Incumbent Vice Mayor Juan Ariel Argañosa Jr. Is running for re-election under Lakas, his opponents were incumbent Councilor Celestino Norman Sotto of NUP (Argañosa's former ally) and former Councilor Ma. Thess Melendez of AKAY ( former ally of both Argañosa and Sotto)

Majayjay vice mayoral election
Party	Candidate	Votes	%
Lakas	Ariel Argañosa	9,100	52.94
NUP	Angel Sotto	6,932	40.33
AKAY	Thess Melendez	1,157	6.73
Total votes		17,189	100
Lakas hold			

==== Paete ====
Incumbent Mayor Ronald Cosico is eligible for reelection.

Paete Mayoral election
Party	Candidate	Votes	%
Lakas	Bokwet Cosico	4,927	35.58
PFP	Papa Ver Madridejos	3,441	24.85
Independent	Mutuk Bagabaldo	3,186	23.01
NUP	Johny Tam	2,294	16.57
Total votes		13,848	100
Lakas hold			

Paete vice mayoral election
Party	Candidate	Votes	%
PFP	Lorena Florsan Velasco	4,692	34.72
Lakas	Lino Baisas	4,218	31.21
AKAY	Kidd Paraiso	2,526	18.69
NUP	Peping Capco	2,079	15.38
Total votes		13,515	100
PFP hold			

==== Pagsanjan ====
Incumbent Mayor Cesar Areza is eligible for reelection, seeking a second term against former Mayor and former Laguna Governor E. R. Ejercito, former Mayor Toto Trinidad and incumbent Vice Mayor Terry Gamit-Talabong.

Pagsanjan mayoral election
Party	Candidate	Votes	%
AKAY	Emilio Ramon Ejercito III	10,190	41.38
NUP	Cesar Arena (Incumbent)	8,601	34.93
PFP	Toto Trinidad	4,775	19.39
Lakas	Terryl Gamit-Talabong	1,060	4.30
Total votes		24,626	100
AKAY gain from NUP			

Pagsanjan vice mayoral election
Party	Candidate	Votes	%
AKAY	Januaro Ferry Garcia	11,594	49.52
NUP	Rachelle Abella	8,748	37.36
PFP	Zaldy Melendrez	3,072	13.12
Total votes		23,414	100
AKAY gain from Lakas			

==== Pakil ====
Incumbent Mayor Vincent Soriano is ineligible for reelection.

Pakil mayoral election
Party	Candidate	Votes	%
Lakas	Unad Hidalgo	6,751	51.45
NUP	Vipops Charles Martinez	4,813	36.68
AKAY	Melody Familara	1,282	9.77
Independent	La Verne Ceredon	177	1.35
Independent	Ka Oca Samela	98	0.75
Total votes		13,121	100
Lakas hold			

Incumbent Vice Mayor Vipops Charles Martinez is running for mayor.

Pakil vice mayoral election
Party	Candidate	Votes	%
Lakas	F4 Fornoles	5,615	45.23
AKAY	Rod Pecolera	3,893	31.36
NUP	Joy Maray	2,907	23.42
Total votes		12,415	100
Lakas gain from NUP			

==== Pangil ====
Incumbent Mayor Gerald Aritao is eligible for reelection, seeking a second term against incumbent Vice Mayor Divine Grace Astoveza and term-limited councilor Joselito Pajarillo.

Pangil mayoral Election
Party	Candidate	Votes	%
PFP	Gerald Aritao	4,167	31.65
NUP	Art Capito	3,900	29.62
AKAY	Tolo Pajarillo	3,053	23.19
Independent	Divine Astoveza	1,906	14.48
Independent	Anna Liza Acaylar	140	1.06
Total votes		13,166	100
PFP hold			

Pangil's incumbent Vice Mayor Divine Grace Astoveza is eligible for reelection but intends to run for mayor. Meanwhile, incumbent Councilor Rianne May Diaz is aiming for the vice mayoralty position. Former Vice Mayor Alfredo Pajarillo is also vying for the same position.

Pangil vice mayoral Election
Party	Candidate	Votes	%
AKAY	Rianne Diaz	7,008	54.97
PFP	Al Pajarillo	2,981	23.38
NUP	Roy Velasquez	2,474	19.41
Independent	Gaddiel Malinay	211	1.66
Independent	Joel Gabuat	74	0.58
Total votes		12,748	100
AKAY gain from Independent			

6 out of 8 incumbent Sangguniang Bayan member seeks for reelection. The two incumbent councilors Tolo Pajarillo and Rianne Diaz seeks for higher positions.

Pangil Sangguniang Bayan Election
Party	Candidate	Votes	%
AKAY	CJ Ader	5,551	6.95
Independent	Herbert Bautista	4,862	6.09
AKAY	Jack Basas	4,538	5.68
NUP	Popoy Rafanan	4,485	5.62
Independent	Pastor Greg Subaybay	4,393	5.50
PFP	Jubert Aritao	4,278	5.36
AKAY	Awit Durante	4,263	5.34
AKAY	Gildo Aguilar	4,254	5.33
PFP	Tawe Castañeda	3,412	4.27
PFP	Kevin Montiero	3,344	4.19
AKAY	Uyan Balbueno	3,272	4.10
PFP	Jessa Baliwas	3,029	3.79
AKAY	Posai Manzana	2,975	3.73
PFP	Marjorie Marj Galvez	2,913	3.65
PFP	Obet Flores	2,896	3.63
PFP	Alex Visaya	2,536	3.18
AKAY	Mark Gaerlan	2,251	2.82
NUP	Gie Reyes	2,142	2.68
NUP	Marlon Talavera	2,133	2.67
Independent	Ramyel Ycoy	1,928	2.41
Independent	Pastor Jay Maglipon	1,748	2.19
NUP	Guillermo Adovas	1,636	2.05
Independent	Art Ivan Acaylar	1,544	1.93
NUP	Josie Taniegra	1,340	1.68
NUP	Etho de Merida	1,101	1.38
NUP	Grace Astudillo	855	1.07
NUP	Prime Paleg	797	1.00
Independent	Boy Galas	547	0.68
PM	Tony Bautista	465	0.58
PM	Maribel Villapaña	377	0.47
Total votes		79,685	100

==== Pila ====
Incumbent Mayor Edgardo Ramos is ineligible for reelection. His son, Mico Ramos, is running in the mayoral position against former Vice Mayor Queen Marilyd Alarva. Term-limited Mayor Edgardo Ramos is running for the vice-mayoral position.

Pila mayoral election
Party	Candidate	Votes	%
NUP	Queen Marilyd Alarva	14,984	50.20
PFP	Mico Ramos	14,476	48.50
Independent	Lito Ramos	388	1.30
Total votes		29,848	100
NUP gain from PFP			

Pila vice mayoral election
Party	Candidate	Votes	%
PFP	Egay Ramos	17,472	59.31
NUP	Reggie Mhar Bote	11,986	40.69
Total votes		29,458	100
PFP gain from NUP			

==== Santa Cruz ====
Incumbent Mayor Edgar San Luis is eligible for reelection, seeking a third and final term against incumbent 4th district Board Member Benjo Agarao.

Santa Cruz mayoral election
Party	Candidate	Votes	%
PFP	Benjo Agarao	34,944	52.46
NUP	Edgar San Luis (Incumbent)	31,670	47.54
Total votes		66,614	100
PFP gain from NUP			

Santa Cruz vice mayoral election
Party	Candidate	Votes	%
Independent	Laarni Malibiran (Incumbent)	38,004	59.13
NUP	Laura Obligacion	26,268	40.87
Total votes		64,272	100
Independent hold			

==== Santa Maria ====
Incumbent Mayor Cindy Carolino is eligible for reelection and seeks for her last term. Meanwhile, former Vice Mayor Virgilia Tuazon is aiming for the position of her former ally.

Santa Maria mayoral Election
Party	Candidate	Votes	%
NUP	Atty. Cindy Carolino	10,765	54.07
PFP	Virgilia Tuazon	9,144	45.93
Total votes		19,909	100
NUP hold			

Incumbent Vice Mayor Norlito Briones is eligible for reelection. Meanwhile, former Councilor Jayson Cuento is also aiming for the position.

Santa Maria vice mayoral Election
Party	Candidate	Votes	%
PFP	Jayson Cuento	11,857	59.79
NUP	Vice Nor Briones	7,973	40.21
Total votes		19,830	100
PFP gain from NUP			

==== Siniloan ====
Incumbent Mayor Patrick Ellis Go is eligible for reelection. Meanwhile, Incumbent Vice Mayor Carla Valderrama seeks for a seat in the position.

Siniloan mayoral election
Party	Candidate	Votes	%
PFP	Patrick Ellis Go (Incumbent)	9,663	45.65
Lakas	Carla Angela Valderrama	9,234	43.63
NUP	Roberto Acoba	1,874	8.85
AKAY	Pepe Acelajado	395	1.87
Total votes		21,166	100
PFP hold			

Incumbent Vice Mayor Carla Valderrama is eligible for reelection, but ran as mayor instead. Incumbent Councilor Joseph Masacupan and former Councilor Rhona Balbalosa eyes for the seat.

Siniloan vice mayoral election
Party	Candidate	Votes	%
Lakas	Joseph Masacupan	11,441	57.25
PFP	Rhona Balbalosa	8,544	42.75
Total votes		19,985	100
Lakas hold			

=== Biñan ===
Incumbent Mayor Arman Dimaguila is term-limited.

Biñan mayoral election
Party	Candidate	Votes	%
NUP	Gel Alonte	107,746	65.54
Aksyon	Cookie Yatco	56,662	34.46
Total votes		164,408	100
NUP hold			

Biñan vice mayoral election
Party	Candidate	Votes	%
NUP	Dada Reyes	106,421	66.39
Aksyon	Joy Abalos-Yatco	53,866	33.61
Total votes		160,287	100
NUP hold			

=== Calamba ===
Incumbent Mayor Roseller Rizal is running for reelection. His opponents are former mayor Timmy Chipeco, former city administrator and former president of City College of Calamba Severino Vergara, and Omar Santos.

Calamba mayoral election
Party	Candidate	Votes	%
Lakas	Roseller Rizal (Incumbent)	194,351	74.02
Nacionalista	Timmy Chipeco	63,617	24.23
PFP	Dok Verong Vergara	4,165	1.59
Independent	Omar Santos	442	0.17
Total votes		262,575	100%
Lakas hold			

Incumbent Angelito ‘Totie’ Lazaro, Jr. is running for re-election. His opponent is actor Anjo Yllana.

Calamba vice mayoral election
Party	Candidate	Votes	%
Lakas	Angelito Lazaro Jr. (Incumbent)	230,438	92.70
Nacionalista	Anjo Yllana	18,148	7.30
Total votes		248,586	100
Lakas hold			

Calamba Sangguniang Panlungsod election
Party	Candidate	Votes	%
PFP	Rajay Lajara	145,812	6.85
Lakas	Jojo Catindig	142,520	6.70
Lakas	Lian Pecho-Aldabe	142,284	6.69
Lakas	Doreen Cabrera	134,287	6.31
Lakas	Atty. Ge Teruel	131,764	6.19
Lakas	Kath Silva	130,096	6.11
Lakas	Niño Lajara	127,838	6.01
Lakas	Pursino Oruga	123,270	5.79
Lakas	Ninong Arvin Manguiat	119,019	5.59
Lakas	Pio Dimapilis	115,145	5.41
Lakas	Moises Morales	113,540	5.34
Lakas	Johnny Carlo Lazaro	110,469	5.19
Lakas	Edison Natividad	109,231	5.13
KANP	Gigi Alcasid	108,919	5.12
Nacionalista	Ate Cong Marie Cardema	81,250	3.82
Independent	Nap Baradas	66,236	3.11
Independent	Florencio Morales Jr.	59,431	2.79
Nacionalista	Kenneth delas Llagas	36,686	1.72
Independent	Don Nikkole Humarang	24,358	1.14
Nacionalista	Paulie Yllana	20,967	0.99
Independent	Doc Juls Magpantay	19,432	0.91
Independent	Noel Lara	16,087	0.76
Independent	Dok Eman Gamez	12,831	0.60
Independent	Alvin Garino	11,058	0.52
Independent	Wheng Belista	9,819	0.46
Independent	Edwin Cadacio	8,678	0.41
Independent	Manuel Pelino Jr.	6,504	0.31
Total votes		2,127,531	100

=== Santa Rosa ===
Incumbent Mayor Arlene Arcillas is eligible for reelection. Mayor Arlene Arcillas and Vice Mayor Arnold Arcillas remain unopposed.

Santa Rosa, mayoral election
Party	Candidate	Votes	%
Lakas	Arlene Arcillas	162,669	100
Total votes		162,669	100
Lakas hold			

Santa Rosa vice mayoral election
Party	Candidate	Votes	%
Lakas	Arnold Arcillas	156,846	100
Total votes		156,846	100
Lakas hold			

Santa Rosa Sangguniang Panlungsod election
Party	Candidate	Votes	%
Lakas	Joey Catindig	107,337	7.89
Lakas	Tita Mela Gonzales	104,030	7.65
Lakas	Doc Louie Algabre	98,405	7.24
Lakas	Mythor Cendaña	96,183	7.07
Lakas	Tess Aala	95,855	7.05
Lakas	Niño NMV Villanueva	91,472	6.73
Lakas	Sonia Laserna	90,836	6.68
Lakas	Lody Carta	89,107	6.55
Independent	Tecs Batitis	87,997	6.47
Lakas	Janine Aala	76,501	5.63
Lakas	Boy Factoriza	75,640	5.56
Lakas	Manoy Alipon	73,535	5.41
Independent	Toti dela Rosa	65,640	4.83
Independent	Mikkie Belen	63,743	4.69
Independent	Doc Imee Aala	63,401	4.66
Independent	Renato Alinsod	22,129	1.63
Independent	Pastor Domingo	15,880	1.17
Independent	Rizalde Manlupao	15,324	1.13
Independent	Amador San Pedro	15,040	1.11
Independent	Jun Sumapid	11,637	0.86
Total votes		1,359,692	100
