= 2022 Laguna local elections =

Part of 2022 Philippine general election

- 9 May 2022
- Registered: 2,045,687
- Turnout: 79.77% ▲9.25pp
- Gubernatorial election
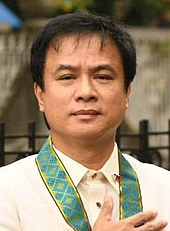
Candidate	Ramil Hernandez	Sol Aragones
Party	PDP–Laban	Nacionalista
Running mate	Katherine Agapay	Jerico Ejercito
Popular vote	872,378	630,232
Percentage	57.60%	41.62%
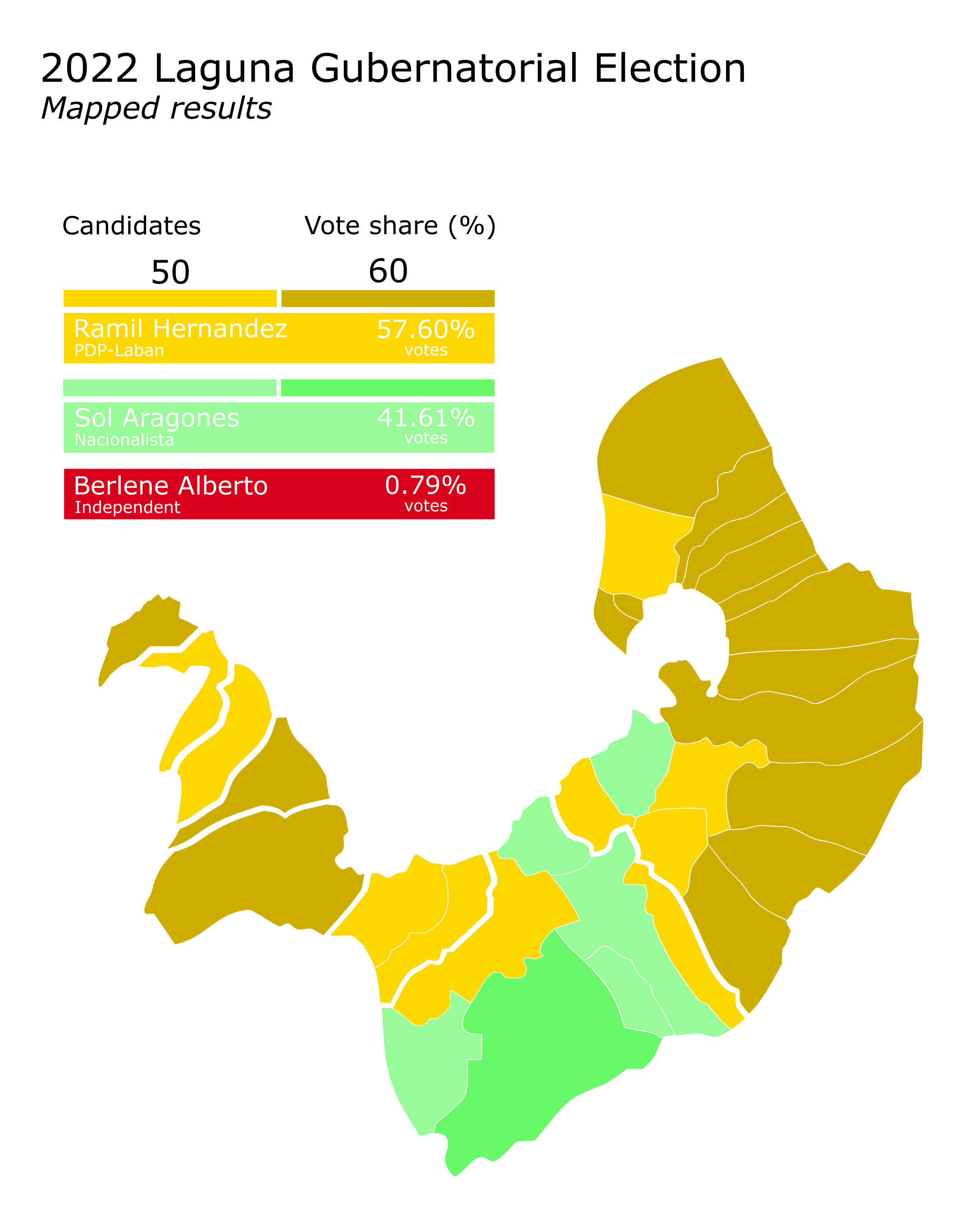
- Gubernatorial election results by City and Municipality.
Governor before election
Ramil Hernandez
PDP–Laban
Elected Governor
Ramil Hernandez
PDP–Laban
- Vice gubernatorial election
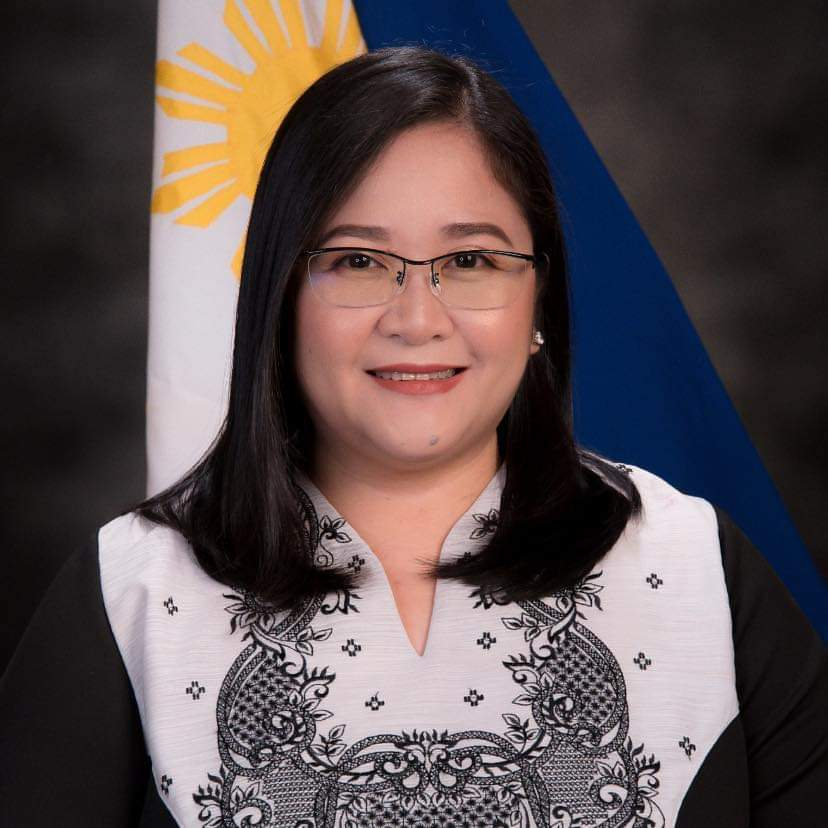

Candidate	Katherine Agapay	Jerico Ejercito
Party	PDP–Laban	PFP
Popular vote	844,447	527,978
Percentage	60.17%	37.62%
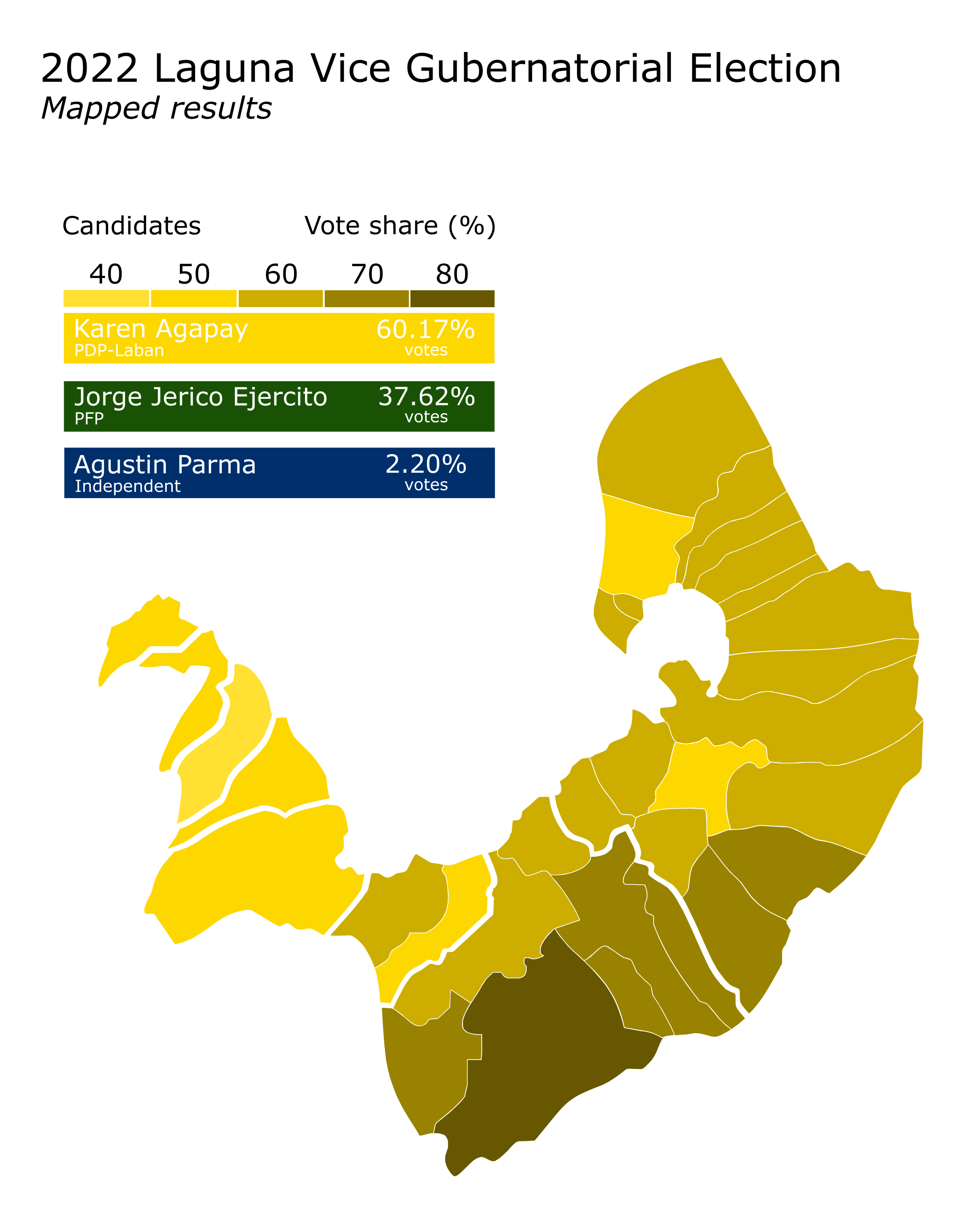
- Vice Gubernatorial election results by City and Municipality.
Vice Governor before election
Katherine Agapay
PDP–Laban
Elected Vice Governor
Katherine Agapay
PDP–Laban

Local elections were held in the province of Laguna on May 9, 2022, as part of the 2022 Philippine general election. Voters selected candidates for all local positions: a town mayor, vice mayor and town council, as well as members of the Sangguniang Panlalawigan, the vice-governor, governor, and representatives for the four districts of Laguna, and the lone districts of Biñan, Calamba, and the newly created lone district for Santa Rosa.

Incumbents Ramil Hernandez and Katherine Agapay were re-elected to the governorship and the vice governorship respectively, defeating their closest opponents Representative Sol Aragones and actor Jerico Ejercito.

== Coalitions ==
As the governor, vice governor, and members of the House of Representatives and the Provincial Board are elected on the same ballot, gubernatorial candidates may present a slate of candidates for each position for every district within the province.

=== Administration coalition ===
Team Hernandez–Agapay (Serbisyong Tama)
#	Name	Party
For Governor
3.	Ramil Hernandez	PDP–Laban
For Vice Governor
1.	Katherine Agapay	PDP–Laban
For House of Representatives (1st district)
5.	Ann Matibag	PDP–Laban
For House of Representatives (2nd district)
2.	Ruth Mariano-Hernandez	PDP–Laban
For House Of Representatives (3rd district)
2.	Loreto Amante	PDP–Laban
For House of Representatives (4th district)
1.	Jam Agarao	PDP–Laban
For Board Member (1st district)
4.	Bong Bejasa	PDP–Laban
6.	JM Carait	PDP–Laban
10.	Sak Matibag	PDP–Laban
For Board Member (2nd district)
3.	Ninoy Bagnes	PDP–Laban
8.	Christian "Niño" Lajara	Aksyon
9.	Peewee Perez	PDP–Laban
For Board Member (3rd district)
1.	Karla Adajar-Lajara	Lakas
4.	Abi Yu	PDP–Laban
For Board Member (4th district)
1.	Benjo Agarao	NUP
4.	Jesse Yu	Lakas

=== Primary opposition coalition ===
Team Aragones–Ejercito (Bagong Laguna)
#	Name	Party
For Governor
2.	Sol Aragones	Nacionalista
For Vice Governor
2.	Jerico Ejercito	PFP
For House of Representatives (1st district)
2.	Dave Almarinez	Nacionalista
For House of Representatives (3rd district)
1.	Angelica Jones–Alarva	PROMDI
For House of Representatives (4th district)
2.	Antonio Carolino	Aksyon
For Board Member (1st district)
1.	Reyna Aguilar	Aksyon
3.	Abigael Alonte	Nacionalista
8.	Danzel Rafter Fernandez	Aksyon
For Board Member (2nd district)
1.	Ma. Virginia Alcasid	Nacionalista
4.	Elizabeth Anne Cardema	Nacionalista
5.	Tito Fortunato Caringal II	Nacionalista
For Board Member (3rd district)
2.	Paul Jess Estrellado	PROMDI
For Board Member (4th District)
2.	Reuben Robinson Orillaza	Nacionalista
3.	Francis Joseph San Luis	Aksyon

== Provincial elections ==
=== Governor ===
Chart of gubernatorial election
1. Hernandez (57.6%)
2. Aragones (41.6%)
3. Alberto (0.79%)

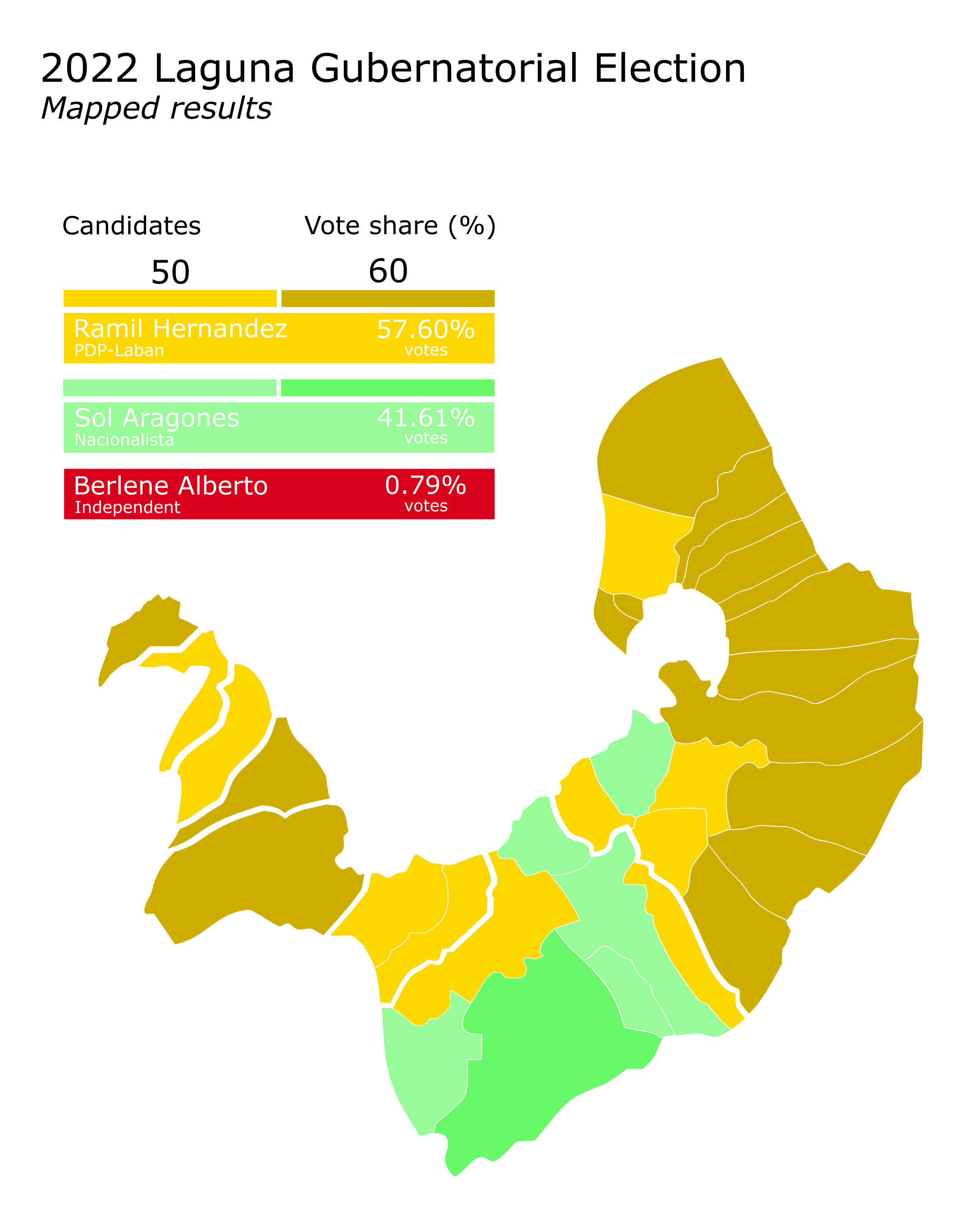
Results per city and municipality according to ER returns

Incumbent Governor Ramil Hernandez sought a third and final term. His main opponent was incumbent Representative Sol Aragones.

Laguna Gubernatorial Election
Party	Candidate	Votes	%
PDP–Laban	Ramil Hernandez (Incumbent)	872,378	57.60
Nacionalista	Sol Aragones	630,232	41.62
MPP	Berlene Alberto	11,936	0.79
Total votes		1,514,637	100.00
PDP–Laban hold			

==== Results By City and Municipality ====
Cities and Municipalities	Hernandez		Aragones		Alberto	
Cities and Municipalities	Votes	%	Votes	%	Votes	%
Alaminos	12,976	49.54	13,118	50.12	88	0.34
Bay	19,706	58.01	14,075	41.43	189	0.56
Biñan	92,005	56.46	69,025	42.36	1,932	1.16
Cabuyao	117,308	68.29	53,069	30.89	1,402	0.82
Calamba	153,763	67.82	70,861	31.26	2,087	0.92
Calauan	18,109	50.22	17,791	49.34	156	0.43
Cavinti	9,824	68.45	4,449	31.00	79	0.55
Famy	6,804	66.88	3,308	32.52	61	0.60
Kalayaan	8,303	63.58	4,677	35.74	90	0.69
Liliw	9,223	44.84	11,279	54.83	67	0.34
Los Baños	34,700	59.44	23,291	39.90	385	0.66
Luisiana	8,365	69.04	3,719	30.69	33	0.27
Lumban	11,006	61.55	6,766	37.64	110	0.62
Mabitac	6,597	58.41	4,601	40.73	97	0.86
Magdalena	7,953	57.17	5,893	42.37	64	0.46
Majayjay	10,920	66.61	5,393	32.89	82	0.50
Nagcarlan	17,283	47.70	18,813	51.92	140	0.39
Paete	8,644	63.19	4,944	36.14	92	0.67
Pagsanjan	12,015	51.75	11,071	47.69	130	0.56
Pakil	7,672	62.24	4,577	37.13	78	0.63
Pangil	7,358	60.10	4,801	39.21	84	0.69
Pila	15,401	56.05	11,972	43.57	105	0.38
Rizal	4,911	45.54	5,831	54.08	41	0.38
San Pablo	46,006	34.49	79,250	65.07	528	0.43
San Pedro	72,322	64.23	39,097	34.72	1,175	1.04
Santa Cruz	30,359	48.87	31,882	50.90	393	0.63
Santa Maria	11,919	65.07	6,302	34.41	95	0.52
Santa Rosa City	86,912	50.86	82,072	48.02	1,914	1.12
Siniloan	13,094	64.57	7,037	34.70	148	0.73
Victoria	10,920	49.01	11,268	50.58	91	0.41
Total votes	872,378	57.60	630,232	41.62	11,936	0.79

=== Vice governor ===
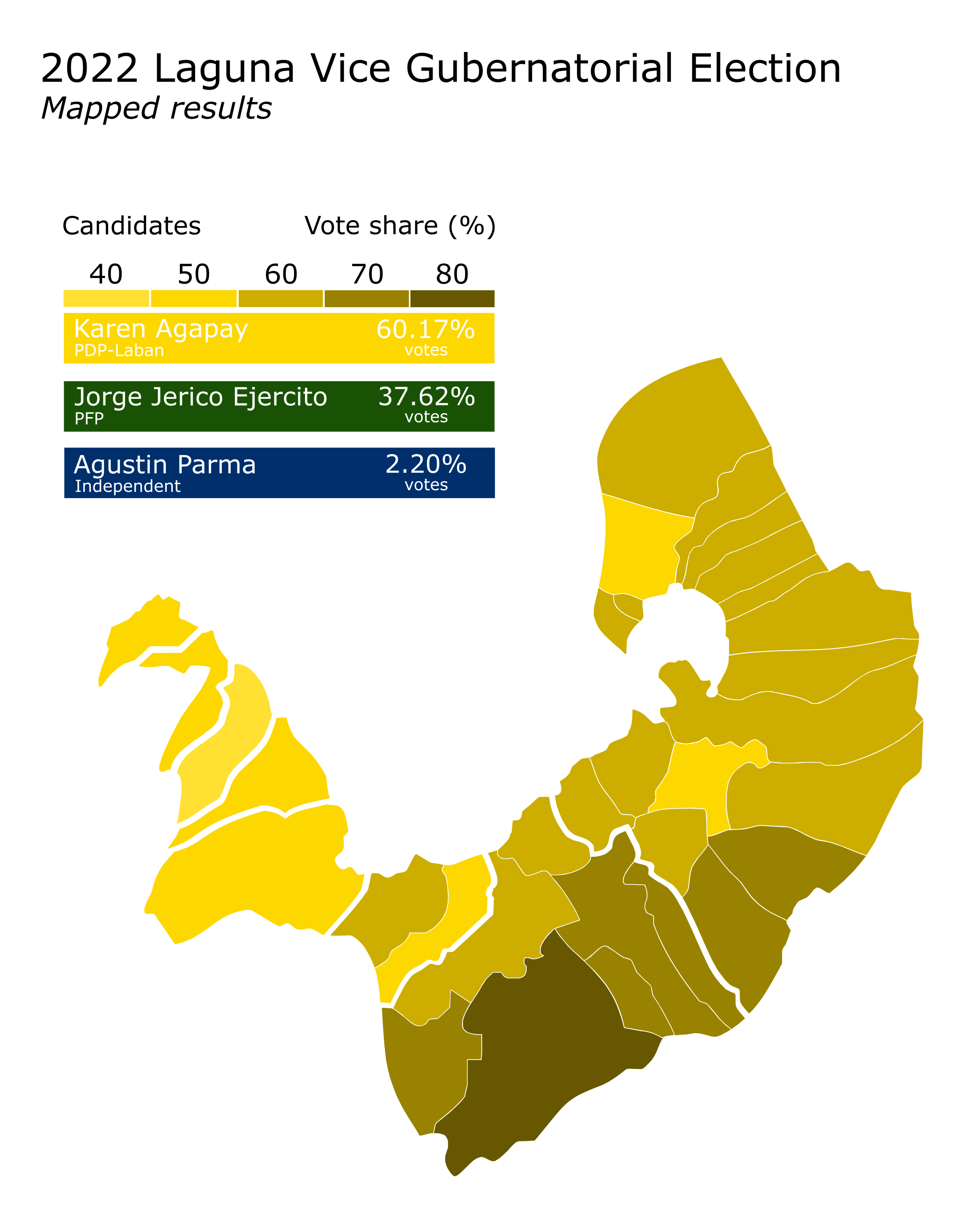
Results per city and municipality according to ER returns.

Chart of vice gubernatorial election
1. Agapay (60.2%)
2. Ejercito (37.6%)
3. Parma (2.20%)

Incumbent Vice Governor Katherine Agapay sought a third and final term. Her main opponent was actor Jerico Ejercito, the son of former Governor ER Ejercito.

Laguna Vice Gubernatorial Election
Party	Candidate	Votes	%
PDP–Laban	Katherine Agapay (Incumbent)	844,447	60.17
PFP	Jerico Ejercito	527,978	37.62
Independent	Agustin Parma	30,906	2.20
Total votes		1,403,356	100.00
PDP–Laban hold			

=== Provincial board ===
Unlike in congressional elections, the districts for the Laguna Provincial Board still have Biñan and Santa Rosa included in the 1st district, and Calamba in the 2nd district.

Party	Votes	%	Seats
PDP-Laban	998,596	34.00	4
Aksyon	598,874	20.39	3
Nacionalista	559,489	19.05	1
Lakas	200,292	6.82	1
NUP	186,326	6.34	1
PROMDI	157,374	5.36	0
BP	106,047	3.61	0
Independent	85,717	2.92	0
Liberal	26,778	0.91	0
KBL	17,980	0.61	0
Ex officio seats			3
Total	2,937,473	100.00	13

==== 1st District ====
- Cities: Biñan, Santa Rosa City, San Pedro City

2022 Provincial Board Election in 1st District of Laguna
Party	Candidate	Votes	%
PDP–Laban	Magtangol Jose Carait (Incumbent)	234,927	22.56
Aksyon	Danzel Rafter Fernandez	221,085	21.23
PDP–Laban	Wilfredo Bejasa Jr.	163,757	15.73
Nacionalista	Abigael Alonte (Incumbent)	146,204	14.04
PROMDI	Luisito Algabre	99,822	9.59
PDP–Laban	Sachiel Alec Kristian Matibag	91,799	8.82
Aksyon	Reynamel Aguilar	33,067	3.18
Liberal	Ma. Exaltacion Borja	26,778	2.57
Independent	Marvin Cuna	16,196	1.56
PROMDI	Benigno Masaredo	7,573	0.73
Total votes		1,041,208	100.00

==== 2nd district ====
- Cities: Cabuyao, Calamba
- Municipalities: Bay, Los Baños

2022 Provincial Board Election in 2nd District of Laguna
Party	Candidate	Votes	%
Aksyon	Christian Niño Lajara (Incumbent)	208,863	18.80
PDP–Laban	Peewee Perez (Incumbent)	183,937	16.56
Nacionalista	Tito Fortunato Caringal II	168,671	15.18
Nacionalista	Ma. Virginia Alcasid	166,504	14.99
PDP–Laban	Neptali Bagnes (Incumbent)	163,467	14.71
Bigkis	Amelito Alimagno	106,047	9.55
Nacionalista	Elizabeth Anne Cardema	51,385	4.63
Independent	Francisco Fernandez	48,519	4.37
Independent	Arturo Celestial	13,534	1.22
Total votes		1,110,927	100.00

==== 3rd District ====
- City: San Pablo City
- Municipalities: Alaminos, Calauan, Liliw. Nagcarlan, Rizal, Victoria

2022 Provincial Board Election in 3rd District of Laguna
Party	Candidate	Votes	%
PDP–Laban	Alejandro Yu (Incumbent)	160,709	40.79
Lakas	Karla Monica Adajar-Lajara	157,889	40.07
PROMDI	Paul Jess Estrellado	49,979	12.68
KBL	Shiela Florentino-Alimon	17,980	4.56
Independent	Olivio Eustaquio	7,468	1.90
Total votes		394,025	100.00

==== 4th District ====
Municipalities: Cavinti, Famy, Kalayaan, Luisiana, Lumban, Mabitac, Magdalena, Majayjay, Paete, Pagsanjan, Pakil, Pangil, Pila, Santa Cruz, Santa Maria, Siniloan

2022 Provincial Board Election in 4th District of Laguna
Party	Candidate	Votes	%
NUP	Joseph Kris Benjamin Agarao	186,326	47.62
Aksyon	Francis Joseph San Luis	135,859	34.72
Lakas	Jesse Yu	42,403	10.84
Nacionalista	Reuben Robinson Orillaza	26,725	6.83
Total votes		391,313	100.00

== Congressional elections ==
=== 1st District ===
Incumbent Dan Fernandez is running in the newly created Lone District of Santa Rosa. Former board member Dave Almarinez and incumbent board member Ann Matibag are the notable candidates for the redistricted seat.

2022 Philippine House of Representatives election in Laguna's 1st district
Party	Candidate	Votes	%
PDP–Laban	Ann Matibag	69,815	50.68
Nacionalista	Dave Almarinez	53,783	39.04
PRP	Dave Aldave	5,346	3.88
Liberal	Kathleen Kay Gilbuena	4,028	2.92
Independent	Edsel Mercado, Jr.	3,889	2.82
Independent	John Gilbuena	895	0.64
Total votes		137,756	100.00
PDP–Laban win (new seat)			

=== 2nd District ===
Ruth Mariano-Hernandez is the incumbent. Her opponent is former PAGCOR Chief Efraim Genuino.

2022 Philippine House of Representatives election in Laguna's 2nd district
Party	Candidate	Votes	%
PDP–Laban	Ruth Mariano-Hernandez (Incumbent)	168,368	64.03
Bigkis	Efraim Genuino	94,571	35.97
Total votes		262,939	100.00
PDP–Laban hold			

=== 3rd District ===
Incumbent Sol Aragones is term-limited and is running for governor. Incumbent San Pablo mayor Loreto Amante will run for the position. His opponents are actress and incumbent board member Angelica Jones, Maria Cristina Villamor and King Mediano.

2022 Philippine House of Representatives election in Laguna 3rd district
Party	Candidate	Votes	%
PDP–Laban	Loreto Amante	197,324	72.76
PROMDI	Angelica Alarva	68,044	25.09
Aksyon	Ma. Cristina Villamor	3,778	1.39
Independent	King Mediano	2,053	0.76
Total votes		271,199	100.00
PDP–Laban gain from Nacionalista			

=== 4th District ===
Incumbent Benjamin Agarao Jr. is term-limited and will run for Mayor of Santa Cruz. His daughter Jam, an incumbent board member, is his party's nominee. Her opponent is former Santa Maria mayor Antonio Carolino.

2022 Philippine House of Representatives election in Laguna 4th district
Party	Candidate	Votes	%
PDP–Laban	Maria Jamina Katherine Agarao	153,495	50.04
Aksyon	Antonio Carolino	153,267	49.96
Total votes		306,762	100.00
PDP–Laban hold			

=== Biñan ===
Marlyn Alonte-Naguiat is the incumbent. Her opponent is Mike Yatco.

2022 Philippine House of Representatives election in the Biñan's lone district
Party	Candidate	Votes	%
PDP–Laban	Marlyn Alonte-Naguiat (Incumbent)	116,376	69.68
PFP	Mike Yatco	50,627	30.32
Total votes		167,003	100.00
PDP–Laban hold			

=== Calamba ===
Incumbent Joaquin Chipeco, Jr. is term-limited. His son, incumbent Mayor Justin Marc Chipeco is his party's nominee. His opponents are incumbent Councilor Charisse Anne Hernandez and Emerson Panganiban.

2022 Philippine House of Representatives election in the Calamba's lone district
Party	Candidate	Votes	%
PDP–Laban	Charisse Anne Hernandez	113,130	50.09
Nacionalista	Justin Marc Chipeco	105,723	46.81
Independent	Emerson Panganiban	6,891	3.09
Total votes		225,834	100.00
PDP–Laban gain from Nacionalista			

=== Santa Rosa ===
Incumbent 1st district representative Dan Fernandez is running in this district. He will face former councilor Petronio "Boy" Factoriza Jr.

2022 Philippine House of Representatives election in the Santa Rosa's lone district
Party	Candidate	Votes	%
NUP	Danilo Fernandez	104,772	64.09
KBL	Boy Factoriza	58,704	35.91
Total votes		163,476	100.00
NUP win (new seat)			

== City and municipal elections ==
All cities and municipalities of Laguna will elect a mayor and a vice-mayor this election. The candidates for mayor and vice mayor with the highest number of votes wins the seat; they are voted separately, therefore, they may be of different parties when elected. Below is the list of mayoralty candidates of each city and municipalities per district.

=== 1st District ===
- City: San Pedro City

==== San Pedro City ====
Incumbent Lourdes Cataquiz is term-limited. Her son, Aaron will run for Mayor. His opponent is Vice Mayor Art Joseph Francis Mercado.

San Pedro City Mayoralty Election
Party	Candidate	Votes	%
Lakas	Art Joseph Francis Mercado	94,475	66.51
Nacionalista	Aaron Cataquiz	47,569	33.48
Lakas gain from Nacionalista			
Total votes		142,044	100.00

San Pedro City vice mayoral election
Party	Candidate	Votes	%
Lakas	Divina Olivarez	89,415	65.14
Nacionalista	Rafael Campos	47,836	34.85
Total votes		137,251	100.00
Lakas gain from PDP–Laban			

=== 2nd District ===
- City: Cabuyao
- Municipality: Bay, Los Baños

==== Cabuyao ====
Cabuyao mayoral election
Party	Candidate	Votes	%
Aksyon	Dennis Felipe Hain	100,987	56.23
Independent	Rommel Gecolea (Incumbent)	76,062	42.35
PDDS	Jim Nomer Galang	1,739	0.97
Independent	Jonelle Peter Muñoz	809	0.45
Total votes		179,597	100.00

Cabuyao vice mayoral election
Party	Candidate	Votes	%
Lakas	Leif Opiña (Incumbent)	86,027	50.45
Aksyon	Evelyn Del Rosario	84,502	49.55
Total votes		170,529	100.00

==== Bay ====
Bay Mayoral election
Party	Candidate	Votes	%
PDP–Laban	Jose Padrid (Incumbent)	23,406	67.82
Independent	Edwin Ramos	11,106	32.18
Total votes		34,512	100.00

Bay vice mayoral election
Party	Candidate	Votes	%
Independent	John Paul Villegas	12,247	36.23
PDP–Laban	Charl Caldo	9,293	27.49
Independent	Teodoro Quirino	7,737	22.89
Independent	Emerson Ilagan (Incumbent)	4,522	13.38
Total votes		33,799	100.00

==== Los Baños ====
Incumbent Antonio Kalaw, who assumed office after the assassination of Mayor Caesar Perez, is running his first full three-year term.

Los Baños Mayoralty Election
Party	Candidate	Votes	%
Bigkis	Anthony Genuino	23,752	39.27
Aksyon	Joel Lapis	19,631	32.46
Reporma	Rodelo Pabalate	11,329	18.73
Independent	Antonio Kalaw (Incumbent)	4,205	6.95
PPP	Myla Alinsunurin	1,390	2.30
Independent	Feliciano Escobin	176	0.29
Total votes		60,483	100.00

Los Baños Vice Mayoral election
Party	Candidate	Votes	%
Bigkis	Josephine Sumangil (Incumbent)	24,829	43.49
Reporma	Aldous Perez	17,090	29.94
Aksyon	Ferdinand Vargas	14,145	24.78
PPP	Nenita Lapitan	1,023	1.79
Total votes		57,087	100.00

=== 3rd District ===
- City: San Pablo City
- Municipality: Alaminos, Calauan, Liliw. Nagcarlan, Rizal, Victoria

==== San Pablo City ====
Incumbent Loreto Amante is term-limited and is running for congressman. His father, incumbent City Administrator and former Mayor Vicente Amante is his party's nominee. His opponent is former board member in 3rd district Laguna Arcadio Gapangada, Jr.

San Pablo City Mayoral election
Party	Candidate	Votes	%
Nacionalista	Vicente Amante	81,712	64.97
Aksyon	Arcadio Gapangada, Jr.	44,051	35.03
Total votes		125,763	100.00

San Pablo City vice mayoral election
Party	Candidate	Votes	%
Nacionalista	Justin Colago (Incumbent)	71,878	59.88
Aksyon	Pamboy Lopez	37,482	31.23
Independent	John Raleigh Alvarez	10,670	8.89
Total votes		120,030	100.00

==== Alaminos ====
Incumbent Ruben Alvarez, who assumed office upon the death of Mayor Eladio Magampon, is running his first full three-year term.

Alaminos Mayoral election
Party	Candidate	Votes	%
Lakas	Glenn Flores	8,549	30.65
Nacionalista	Ruben Alvarez (Incumbent)	8,342	29.91
Aksyon	Lorenzo Zuñiga, Jr.	6,944	24.90
Independent	Clarinda Magampon	4,054	14.54
Total votes		27,889	100.00

Alaminos vice mayoral election
Party	Candidate	Votes	%
Lakas	Victor Mitra	12,696	48.20
PDP–Laban	Lorelei Pampolina	7,468	28.35
Nacionalista	Rammel Banzuela	6,175	23.44
Total votes		26,339	100.00

==== Calauan ====
Incumbent Buenifrido Berris is term-limited.

Calauan Mayoral election
Party	Candidate	Votes	%
PDP–Laban	Roseller Caratihan	15,246	40.60
Nacionalista	Levin Berris	13,220	35.20
Lakas	Dante Escarez	9,089	24.20
Total votes		37,555	100.00

Calauan vice mayoral election
Party	Candidate	Votes	%
Lakas	Allan Jun Sanchez	19,583	54.41
Nacionalista	Chesskha Hernandez (Incumbent)	11,205	31.13
PDP–Laban	Eudivigio Roxas III	5,201	14.45
Total votes		35,989	100.00

==== Liliw ====
Incumbent Ericson Sulibit is term-limited.

Liliw Mayoral election
Party	Candidate	Votes	%
PDP–Laban	Ildefonso Monleon	10,515	48.45
Aksyon	Arnold Montesines	5,732	26.41
Independent	Victor Agapay	5,458	25.15
Total votes		21,705	100.00

Liliw vice mayoral election
Party	Candidate	Votes	%
PDP–Laban	Ericson Sulibit	10,857	51.92
Nacionalista	Maria Ayessa Ticzon	5,910	28.26
Aksyon	James Cyrus Coligado	4,145	19.82
Total votes		20,912	100.00

==== Nagcarlan ====
Nagcarlan Mayoral election
Party	Candidate	Votes	%
Nacionalista	Elmor Vita	21,974	57.78
PDP–Laban	Lourdes Arcasetas (Incumbent)	16,055	42.22
Total votes		38,029	100.00

Nagcarlan vice mayoral election
Party	Candidate	Votes	%
Aksyon	Rexon Arevalo (Incumbent)	25,357	68.64
PDP–Laban	Evelyn Sotoya	11,587	31.36
Total votes		36,944	100.00

==== Rizal ====
Rizal Mayoral election
Party	Candidate	Votes	%
PDP–Laban	Vener Muñoz (Incumbent)	8,435	74.63
Liberal	Filson Joseph Uy	2,867	25.37
Total votes		11,302	100.00

Rizal vice mayoral election
Party	Candidate	Votes	%
PDP–Laban	Antonino Aurelio (Incumbent)	6,561	59.03
Liberal	Hubert Arcel De Leon	4,554	40.97
Total votes		11,115	100.00

==== Victoria ====
Victoria Mayoral election
Party	Candidate	Votes	%
Nacionalista	Dwight Kampitan (Incumbent)	10,160	42.13
PDP–Laban	Corazon Almeida	9,373	38.87
Aksyon	Raul Gonzales	3,956	16.40
PROMDI	Saturnino Rebong III	629	2.61
Total votes		24,118	100.00

Victoria vice mayoral election
Party	Candidate	Votes	%
Nacionalista	Recto Kampitan, Jr. (Incumbent)	12,574	56.28
PDP–Laban	Efren Maloles	9,766	43.72
Total votes		22,340	100.00

=== 4th District ===
- Municipalities: Cavinti, Famy, Kalayaan, Luisiana, Lumban, Mabitac, Magdalena, Majayjay, Paete, Pagsanjan, Pakil, Pangil, Pila, Santa Cruz, Santa Maria, Siniloan

==== Cavinti ====
Cavinti Mayoral election
Party	Candidate	Votes	%
PDP–Laban	Arrantlee Arroyo	5,589	36.08
Lakas	Bethoven Dela Torre	5,225	33.73
Nacionalista	Ariza Pereja	3,124	20.17
Aksyon	Rick Jayson Tatlonghari	1,554	10.03
Total votes		15,492	100.00

Cavinti vice mayoral election
Party	Candidate	Votes	%
PDP–Laban	Milbert Oliveros	7,073	46.99
Lakas	Jovenil Gordula	5,024	33.38
Nacionalista	Michelle Flores	2,045	13.59
Aksyon	Joel Pio Bleza	911	6.05
Total votes		15,053	100.00

==== Famy ====
Famy Mayoral election
Party	Candidate	Votes	%
Independent	Lorenzo Rellosa	3,657	32.42
Lakas	Renonia Muramatsu	3,119	27.65
PDP–Laban	Darwin Pangilinan	3,032	26.88
Nacionalista	Gertrudes Andaya	802	7.11
Aksyon	Emmanuel Acomular	669	5.93
Total votes		11,279	100.00

Famy vice mayoral election
Party	Candidate	Votes	%
Lakas	Wilfredo Valois	4,937	46.29
PDP–Laban	Lordney Go	2,170	20.35
Independent	Constancio Fernandez	1,863	17.47
Nacionalista	Alejandre De Leon	1,696	15.90
Total votes		10,666	100.00

==== Kalayaan ====
Kalayaan Mayoral election
Party	Candidate	Votes	%
Independent	Sandy Laganapan (Incumbent)	8,626	62.75
Aksyon	Teodoro Adao, Jr.	5,006	36.42
Independent	Efren Reyes	115	0.84
Total votes		13,747	100.00

Kalayaan vice mayoral election
Party	Candidate	Votes	%
Independent	Christopher Ramiro	8,943	66.63
Independent	John Edward Kenneth Ragaza (Incumbent)	4,478	33.37
Total votes		13,421	100.00

==== Luisiana ====
Luisiana Mayoral election
Party	Candidate	Votes	%
Nacionalista	Jomapher Alvarez	5,411	42.38
NUP	Jonieces Acaylar	4,023	31.51
PDP–Laban	Ness Rondilla	2,734	21.41
Aksyon	Luigi Miguel Villatuya	599	4.69
Total votes		12,767	100.00

Luisiana vice mayoral election
Party	Candidate	Votes	%
Nacionalista	Luibic Jacob	5,506	45.13
Lakas	Armando Taguilaso	4,113	33.71
PDP–Laban	Andy Uy	2,582	21.16
Total votes		12,201	100.00

==== Lumban ====
Lumban Mayoral election
Party	Candidate	Votes	%
PDP–Laban	Rolan Ubatay (Incumbent)	11,809	62.87
Reporma	Rhoda Rabie	6,975	37.13
Total votes		18,784	100.00

Lumban vice mayoral election
Party	Candidate	Votes	%
PDP–Laban	Belen Raga (Incumbent)	13,377	73.93
PDP–Laban	Romelio Ladub	4,717	26.07
Total votes		18,094	100.00

==== Mabitac ====
Mabitac Mayoral election
Party	Candidate	Votes	%
PDP–Laban	Alberto Reyes	4,849	39.85
Liberal	Gerardo Consignado	3,769	30.97
Aksyon	Angelito Valderrama	3,551	29.18
Total votes		12,169	100.00

Mabitac vice mayoral election
Party	Candidate	Votes	%
PDP–Laban	Ronald Sana	5,443	46.59
Aksyon	Felipe Barba	3,159	27.04
Independent	Emiliano Cabago	3,080	26.37
Total votes		11,682	100.00

==== Magdalena ====
Incumbent Mayor David Aventurado Jr. is term-limited. Incumbent Vice Mayor Pedro Bucal will run for Mayor.

Magdalena Mayoralty Election
Party	Candidate	Votes	%
Aksyon	Pedro Bucal	5,981	40.21
PDP–Laban	Cesar Articona	5,756	38.70
Nacionalista	Christine Criste	2,148	14.44
Lakas	Henry Chua	988	6.64
Total votes		14,873	100.00

Magdalena vice mayoral election
Party	Candidate	Votes	%
Aksyon	Maximo Sotomayor	6,450	46.83
Lakas	Larry Ibañez	4,626	33.59
PDP–Laban	Arnel Quierez	2,698	19.59
Total votes		13,774	100.00

==== Majayjay ====
Majayjay Mayoral election
Party	Candidate	Votes	%
Nacionalista	Romeo Amorado	9,880	57.12
PDP–Laban	Carlo Invinzor Clado (Incumbent)	7,416	42.88
Total votes		17,296	100.00

Majayjay vice mayoral election
Party	Candidate	Votes	%
Aksyon	Ariel Argañosa	9,756	57.33
PDP–Laban	Edison Reyes	7,262	42.67
Total votes		17,018	100.00

==== Paete ====
Incumbent mayor Rojilyn Bagabaldo is term-limited and is running for Vice Mayor. Incumbent Vice Mayor Aurelio Paraiso is running in his place. His opponents include former Mayor Elmoise Afurong, Brgy. Ibaba del Norte Captain Efren Capco, former Municipal Administrator Ronald Cosico, former Councilor Lourdes Sunga, former mayoral candidate Marceliano Cadayona, basketball coach Johny Tam, and independent bets Andres Caguin and Alejandro Garcia.

Paete Mayoral election
Party	Candidate	Votes	%
Lakas	Ronald Cosico	3,513	24.39
PDP–Laban	Aurelio Paraiso	3,478	24.15
NUP	Johny Tam	3,059	21.24
Aksyon	Lourdes Fadul-Sunga	1,580	10.97
PDSP	Efren Capco	1,071	7.44
Independent	Andres Caguin	782	5.43
Independent	Elmoise Afurong	417	2.90
Nacionalista	Marceliano Cadayona	348	2.42
Independent	Alejandro Garcia	154	1.07
Total votes		14,402	100.00

Paete Vice mayoral election
Party	Candidate	Votes	%
Lakas	Virgilio Madridejos, Jr.	8,273	59.72
PDP–Laban	Rojilyn Bagabaldo	5,134	37.06
Nacionalista	Bertito Cura	445	3.21
Total votes		13,852	100.00

==== Pagsanjan ====
Incumbent Peter Casius Trinidad is running for reelection. His opponent is former mayor and incumbent vice mayor Girlie Ejercito.

Pagsanjan Mayoral election
Party	Candidate	Votes	%
Nacionalista	Cesar Areza	8,837	35.97
PFP	Girlie Ejercito	7,434	30.26
PDP–Laban	Peter Casius Trinidad (Incumbent)	7,362	29.97
Aksyon	Eliezer Gojas	932	3.79
Total votes		24,565	100.00

Pagsanjan Vice Mayoral election
Party	Candidate	Votes	%
Lakas	Terryl Gamit-Talabong	8,183	35.31
PFP	Januario Ferry Garcia	8,061	34.79
PDP–Laban	Paul Christian Cabrega	3,035	13.10
Independent	Ricardo Fabian	2,920	12.60
Aksyon	Julio Sacluti	973	4.20
Total votes		23,172	100.00

==== Pakil ====
Pakil Mayoral election
Party	Candidate	Votes	%
Lakas	Vincent Soriano (Incumbent)	8,314	100.00
Total votes		8,314	100.00

Pakil Vice Mayoral election
Party	Candidate	Votes	%
Aksyon	Vipops Charles Martinez (Incumbent)	7,283	58.68
Lakas	Alfredo Maray, Jr.	5,128	41.32
Total votes		12,411	100.00

==== Pangil ====
Pangil mayoral election
Party	Candidate	Votes	%
Independent	Gerald Aritao	3,846	29.55
Aksyon	Raymund Diaz	2,657	20.41
KBL	Oscar Rafanan	1,916	14.72
Lakas	Arturo Capito	1,913	14.70
Nacionalista	Gildo Aguilar	1,749	13.44
UNA	Glenda Reyes	643	4.94
Independent	Gaddiel Malinay	243	1.87
Independent	Freddie Acaylar	50	0.38
Total votes		12,917	100.00

Pangil Vice Mayoral election
Party	Candidate	Votes	%
Independent	Divine Grace Astoveza	5,763	47.39
KBL	Rolando Velasquez	2,695	22.16
Lakas	Richmund Reyes	2,550	20.97
Nacionalista	Lucila Jbeili	1,153	9.48
Total votes		12,161	100.00

==== Pila ====
Pila Mayoral election
Party	Candidate	Votes	%
PDP–Laban	Edgardo Ramos (Incumbent)	16,035	55.81
Nacionalista	Jose Rafael Antonio	8,099	28.19
Aksyon	Wilfredo Quiat	4,185	14.57
Independent	Lorenzo Calubayan	411	1.43
Total votes		28,730	100.00

Pila Vice Mayoral election
Party	Candidate	Votes	%
PDP–Laban	Reggie Mhar Bote (Incumbent)	14,062	53.07
Aksyon	Samson Carillo	12,437	46.93
Total votes		26,499	100.00

==== Santa Cruz ====
Incumbent Edgar San Luis is running for reelection against Incumbent 4th District Congressman Benjamin Agarao Jr..

Santa Cruz Mayoral election
Party	Candidate	Votes	%
Aksyon	Edgar San Luis (Incumbent)	33,062	50.97
PDP–Laban	Benjamin Agarao Jr.	31,809	49.03
Total votes		64,871	100.00
Aksyon hold			

Incumbent Laarni A. Malibiran is running for reelection against her predecessor Incumbent Councilor and Former Vice Mayor Louie De Leon.

Santa Cruz Vice Mayoral election
Party	Candidate	Votes	%
PROMDI	Laarni Malibiran (Incumbent)	37,099	59.74
Aksyon	Louie De Leon	24,997	40.26
Total votes		62,096	100.00
PROMDI hold			

Santa Cruz Municipal council election
Party	Candidate	Votes	%
Aksyon	Ambiel Panganiban (Incumbent)	34,775	8.37
Independent	Ate Lea Almarves (Incumbent)	29,711	7.15
Aksyon	Trophy Tolentino	27,828	6.69
Independent	Doc. Niño De Las Armas	26,911	6.47
Independent	Pasirit Kalaw	26,626	6.41
PROMDI	Macmac Joven (Incumbent)	25,087	6.03
Aksyon	Lucena "Lola lucy" Odejar (Incumbent)	25,087	6.03
Aksyon	Alan Pamatmat (Incumbent)	24,667	5.93
Aksyon	Efren Diaz (Incumbent)	24,322	5.85
Aksyon	Angelito Joven	22,537	5.42
Aksyon	Ramon Tan (Incumbent)	22,179	5.34
Aksyon	Obi Gabinete	22,096	5.32
Independent	Totoy San Juan	21,494	5.17
Independent	Mia Martinez	21,145	5.09
Independent	Demmer Halili	18,990	4.57
Independent	Eric Ambrocio	16,543	3.98
Independent	Renato Ernas	15,717	3.78
Independent	Percy San Miguel	8,522	2.05
Independent	Ramonito Lauta	1,459	0.35
Total votes		415,696	100.00
Aksyon hold			

==== Santa Maria ====
Santa Maria Mayoral election
Party	Candidate	Votes	%
Aksyon	Cindy Carolino (Incumbent)	10,164	51.75
Independent	Jayson Cuento	9,475	48.25
Total votes		19,639	100.00
Aksyon hold			

Santa Maria Vice Mayoral election
Party	Candidate	Votes	%
Aksyon	Norlito Briones	9,758	53.09
Independent	Esteban Caisip	8,621	46.91
Total votes		18,379	100.00
Aksyon hold			

==== Siniloan ====
Siniloan Mayoral election
Party	Candidate	Votes	%
PDP–Laban	Rainier Leopando (Incumbent)	14,558	70.13
Nacionalista	Allan Gualberto	6,201	29.87
Total votes		20,759	100.00
PDP–Laban hold			

Siniloan vice mayoral election
Party	Candidate	Votes	%
PDP–Laban	Patrick Ellis Go (Incumbent)	7,420	35.54
Nacionalista	Rhona Balbalosa	7,086	33.94
Aksyon	Roberto Acoba	6,369	30.51
Total votes		20,875	100.00
PDP–Laban hold			

=== Biñan ===
Incumbent Arman Dimaguila is running for reelection against Bobet Borja and Former Councilor Donna Yatco.

Biñan mayoral election
Party	Candidate	Votes	%
PDP–Laban	Walfredo Dimaguila, Jr. (Incumbent)	115,992	68.66
Nacionalista	Donna Angela Yatco	51,950	30.75
PFP	Joaquin Borja	996	0.59
Total votes		168,938	100.00
PDP–Laban hold			

Biñañ City vice mayoral election
Party	Candidate	Votes	%
PDP–Laban	Angelo Alonte (Incumbent)	125,422	82.59
Nacionalista	Mario Peralta	26,435	17.41
Total votes		151,857	100.00
PDP–Laban hold			

=== Calamba ===
Incumbent Timmy Chipeco is term-limited and is running for congressman. His brother, incumbent councilor Joey Chipeco is his party's nominee. His opponents are former governor and former Pagsanjan Mayor ER Ejercito and incumbent Vice Mayor Roseller Rizal.

Calamba mayoral election
Party	Candidate	Votes	%
PDP–Laban	Roseller Rizal	116,777	49.43
Nacionalista	Julian Eugene Chipeco	78,325	33.15
PFP	Emilio Ramon Ejercito	41,149	17.42
Total votes		236,251	100.00
PDP–Laban gain from Nacionalista			

Incumbent Roseller Rizal is term-limited and is running for mayor. His party nominated incumbent councilor Angelito ‘Totie’ Lazaro, Jr. His opponent is incumbent councilor Soliman Rajay Lajara.

Calamba vice mayoral election
Party	Candidate	Votes	%
PDP–Laban	Angelito Lazaro, Jr.	126,445	56.56
Nacionalista	Soliman Lajara	100,115	44.78
Total votes		223,560	100.00
PDP–Laban gain from Nacionalista			

=== Santa Rosa City ===
Incumbent mayor Arlene Arcillas is running for reelection. She will face incumbent vice mayor Arnel Gomez. Meanwhile, former vice mayor Arnold Arcillas will run for vice mayor.

Santa Rosa City mayoral election
Party	Candidate	Votes	%
PDP–Laban	Arlene Arcillas	125,159	71.57
Bigkis	Arnel Gomez	46,827	26.78
Independent	Joyce Kathlene Lee	2,900	1.66
Total votes		774,886	100.00
PDP–Laban hold			

Santa Rosa City vice mayoral election
Party	Candidate	Votes	%
PDP–Laban	Arnold Arcillas	119,231	73.30
Aksyon	Alvin Abaja	35,378	21.75
Independent	Onofre Sumapid, Jr.	8,061	4.96
Total votes		762,670	100.00
PDP–Laban gain from NPC			
