= Gem Castillo =

Filipina actress and politician

- Born: Benilda Ruello Retuerto; November 7, 1975 (age 50); Tagum, Davao del Norte, Philippines
- Education: Lyceum of the Philippines University
- Occupations: Actress, singer, businesswoman, Politician
- Political party: NUP
- Spouse: Vicente B. Amante

Benilda Ruello Retuerto-Amante (born November 7, 1975), better known by her stage name Gem Castillo, is a Filipino politician, businesswoman and former actress. She began her acting career in the early 1990s when she starred in movies. A prized find of Kuya Germs, she was a talent at the defunct but long-running That's Entertainment (Philippine TV program).

== Early life and education ==
Gem Castillo is a native of San Pablo City, Laguna, Philippines, and provides entertainment to people there.

== Career ==
Castillo was discovered by film executives and starred in movies produced by companies. She became more popular when she frequently appeared in That's Entertainment (Philippine TV program), conversing with host German Moreno. She would later sing regularly in the program and make an album under Ivory Music and Video, formerly Ivory Records Corporation.

== Filmography ==
=== Film ===
| Year | Title | Role |
|---|---|---|
| 1995 | Ang Syota Kong Balikbayan | Herself |
| 1996 | Pusong Hiram | Herself |
| 1997 | Anak ng Yakuza | Jenny |

=== TV series/variety show ===
| Year | Title | Role |
|---|---|---|
| 1980s–1996 | That's Entertainment | Herself |

== Political career ==
Castillo ran for vice-governor of the province of Laguna in the 2025 elections under the slate of Congressman Dan Fernandez who ran for governor, with both of them lost.

== Personal life ==
Castillo married San Pablo City Mayor Vicente B. Amante.

== Awards and recognition ==
- Most Outstanding Filipino in Humanitarian Service (2023), AmerAsia
- Honorary Philanthropist of the Year (2022), Nation Builders and Mosliv Awards (NBMA)
- Diamond Excellence Awards (2022), Inspire Mag PH
