= Bigkis Pinoy Movement =

Political party in the Philippines

- Leader: Amando Ocampo
- Founded: 2001
- Senate: 0 / 24
- House of Representatives: 0 / 317

The Bigkis Pinoy Movement (BIGKIS, transl. Bind Filipinos Movement) is a Filipino political party.

== Early history ==
In 2001, Efraim Genuino, a representative of the party, was appointed by Gloria Macapagal Arroyo as the chairperson of the Philippine Amusement and Gaming Corporation. In January 2002, Bigkis Pinoy and the Rebolusyonaryong Alyansang Makabansa formed an alliance at the Cuneta Astrodome, Pasay, where the latter helped remove the Marcos administration in 1986. In the 2010 Philippine House of Representatives elections, they entered seven candidates. They gained 206,853 votes, 0.60 percent of the votes. None of their candidates won. Efraim Genuino, the chairperson of the Philippine Amusement and Gaming Corporation under Gloria Macapagal Arroyo, was charged with graft in 2011. He was found innocent and the charges against him were removed. In 2012, Efraim's son, Anthony Genuino, who was the mayor of Los Baños, Laguna, was sued by councilors Jay Rolusta and Francisco Lapis for alleged misuse of funds. Genuino was charged with malversation for allegedly using rice funds worth 3 million pesos for an election campaign.

== Further history ==
In the 2022 Philippine Senate election, Leo Olarte ran under the party. He placed 53rd with 567,649 votes. In the 2022 Laguna local elections, Bigkis gained the mayoral seat, the vice mayoral seat, and 4 council seats for the municipality of Los Baños, Laguna.

== Electoral performance ==
=== Senate ===
Year	Votes	%	Seats won	Seats after	+/–	Result
2022	567,649	1.02	0 / 12	0 / 24	Steady	Lost
2025	Did not participate					

=== House of Representatives ===
Year	Congressional district elections			Party-list election			Total seats	+/–	Result
Year	Votes	%	Seats	Votes	%	Seats	Total seats	+/–	Result
2004	Did not participate			186,264	1.46	0 / 52	0 / 261	Steady	Lost
2007	Did not participate			77,351	0.48	0 / 53	0 / 270	Steady	Lost
2010	206,929	0.61	0 / 228	Disqualified			0 / 286	Steady	Lost
2013	Did not participate								
2016	Did not participate								
2019	Did not participate								
2022	94,571	0.20	0 / 253	Did not participate			0 / 316	Steady	Lost
2025	Did not participate								

== Notable members ==
=== Politicians ===
- Caesar Perez - Laguna Vice Governor
- Ramon Reyes – Isabela 3rd District Representative, Sangguniang Panlalawigan
- Anthony Genuino – Mayor of Los Baños, Laguna
- Leren Bautista – Councilor, Los Baños, Laguna
- Marlo Alipon – Councilor, Los Baños, Laguna
- Jonsi Siytiap – Councilor, Los Baños, Laguna
- Mike Concio – Councilor, Los Baños, Laguna

=== Candidates ===
- Leo Olarte – Candidate for Senator, 2022 Philippine Senate election
- Ricky Yabut – Candidate for Mayor, Makati, 2019 Philippine general election
