= Sol Aragones =

Filipino politician and former journalist (born 1977)

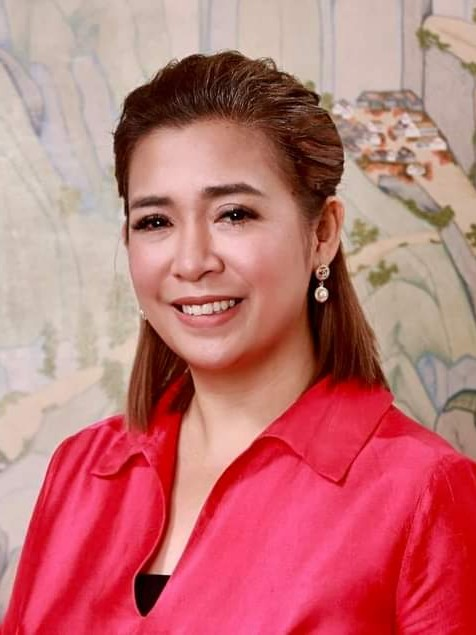
- Aragones in 2022

19th Governor of Laguna
- Incumbent
- Assumed office June 30, 2025
- Vice Governor: JM Carait
- Preceded by: Ramil Hernandez

Member of the Philippine House of Representatives from Laguna's 3rd congressional district
- In office June 30, 2013 – June 30, 2022
- Preceded by: Maria Evita Arago
- Succeeded by: Loreto Amante

Personal details
- Born: Marisol Castillo Aragones; November 7, 1977 (age 49) San Pablo, Laguna, Philippines
- Party: AKAY (2024–present)
- Other political affiliations: Nacionalista (2018–2024); PDP–Laban (2016–2018); UNA (2012–2016)
- Spouse: Paulo Sampelo (m. 2005)
- Children: 1
- Education: University of the Philippines Los Banos (BS)
- Occupation: Politician; television journalist

Marisol "Sol" Castillo Aragones-Sampelo (born November 7, 1977) is a Filipino politician and former journalist who is serving as the 19th governor of Laguna since 2025. The founder of the Akay National Political Party (AKAY), she previously served as the representative of Laguna's third district from 2013 to 2022 and ran for governor in the 2022 elections.

Educated at the University of the Philippines Los Baños, Aragones began her career as a reporter for ABS-CBN and as a radio anchor for DZMM. She held senior reporting roles for TV Patrol, Bandila, and Umagang Kay Ganda, and received several accolades for her work.

Aragones entered politics in 2013 after being elected to the lower house of Congress. As a representative, she introduced legislation related to education, health services, and livelihood opportunities. Upon being term-limited in 2022, she ran for governor and lost to then incumbent governor Ramil Hernandez. Following her defeat, she established a national party from her former healthcare initiative, AKAY, and launched a successful bid for governor.

== Early life and education ==
Marisol Castillo Aragones was born on November 6, 1977, in San Pablo, Laguna, to Rolando Aragones, a tricycle driver, and Nora Castillo, a baker. She attended secondary school in Canossa College in San Pablo, Laguna, where she was a student leader. She graduated in 1998 with a BS in Development Communication at the University of the Philippines Los Baños, with a major in Community Broadcasting.

== Journalism career ==
After graduation, she worked for ABS-CBN as a news reporter until September 2012. She also worked as a radio anchor for DZMM during this period.

She then worked as a writer for Hoy Gising!, eventually becoming a reporter. She was segment host for Salamat Dok and Alas Singko Y Medya, segment producer for Verum EST: Totoo Ba Ito? and True Crime, and co-host of the documentary Kalye with Anthony Taberna and Atom Araullo. She was the anchor for Nagbabagang Balita (breaking/hourly news) and DZMM's S.R.O. - Suhestyon, Reaksyon at Opinyon. She was also the Senior Reporter for TV Patrol, Bandila, and Umagang Kay Ganda. She was recognized as an outstanding field reporter, winning the Gandingan Award in 2006, the Distinguished Alumna Award in Media Practice by UP in 2009, the Outstanding San Pableños Award in May 2010, and the best field reporter in the 2011 Communication Guild (Comguild) Awards.

== House of Representatives (2013–2022) ==
=== Elections ===
In 2013, Aragones ran for a seat in the House of Representatives in Laguna's third district as a member of the United Nationalist Alliance. During the campaign, she allied with former governor ER Ejercito and board member Angelica Alarva. She went on to defeat the incumbent representative, Maria Evita Arago, by more than 10,000 votes. She was re-elected in 2016 and in 2019.

=== Tenure ===
During her tenure, Aragones introduced legislation related to education, health services, and livelihood opportunities. Among these bills were the Teen Pregnancy Prevention, Responsibility and Opportunity Act, the Pregnant Women's Protection Act, and the Sexual Orientation or Gender Identity Discrimination Prohibition Act.

== Laguna gubernatorial campaigns ==
=== 2022 ===
Upon being term-limited as representative, Aragones ran for governor of Laguna in the 2022 elections, but lost to incumbent governor Ramil Hernandez.

=== 2025 ===
On May 10, 2024, Aragones established the Akay National Political Party from her "Akay Ni Sol" initiative, which had advocated for support for persons with disabilities (PWD) since 2022. Later that year, she launched a second bid for governor for the 2025 elections. Her platform revolved around policies concerning health and wellness, a theme her camp emphasized throughout the campaign.

During the campaign, she declared her support for the senatorial bid of Rodante Marcoleta, a key figure in the shutdown of ABS-CBN, a move that attracted criticism from her former colleagues at ABS-CBN. She went on to win the election, becoming the second woman to be elected to the office after Teresita Lazaro, who served from 2001 to 2010. She received 39.80% of the vote, leading in 24 of the province's 30 cities and municipalities, including upset victories in the bailiwicks of her opponents.

== Governor of Laguna (since 2025) ==
Aragones began her term on June 30, 2025, being sworn into office by Quezon governor Angelina Tan on July 2 at the Cultural Center in Santa Cruz. She has appointed Gerry Pelayo, a former mayor of Candaba, as the provincial administrator and Ronald Barcena as her chief of staff. As governor, she has cited healthcare, tourism, and agriculture as the priorities of her administration. Leading up to her term, Aragones attracted criticism online over her plans to brand her programs with her name, "Sol", and her alternate approach of using "Gob", an abbreviation of gobernador (lit. 'governor').

In September 2026, a group of petitioners, including provincial board member Lorenzo Zuñiga Jr., filed a complaint before the Ombudsman against Aragones alleging that her administration's free review assistance program to examination takers did not undergo proper bidding and procurement processes. Aragones denied the accusations. The following month, a separate complaint was filed by two members of the provincial board and a former hospital executive accusing Aragones of graft over the alleged operation of an unlicensed chemotherapy facility at the Laguna Medical Center.

=== Healthcare ===
During her inauguration, Aragones announced her flagship "Akay ni Sol Botika" program, which sought to build healthcare centers in all of the province's cities and municipalities by November 2025. Among her early actions in office was launching a poster campaign in hospitals aiming to discourage "rude" behavior from hospital workers, a move health workers criticized as dismissive of their difficulties working in the country's strained healthcare system.

== Personal life ==
Aragones married Paulo Sampelo on December 15, 2005. They have one daughter together.

== Electoral history ==
Electoral history of Sol Aragones
Year	Office	Party	Votes received				Result
Year	Office	Party	Total	%	P.	Swing	Result
2013	Representative (Laguna–3rd)	UNA	92,273	50.58%	1st	—N/a	Won
2016	Representative (Laguna–3rd)	UNA	154,339	71.12%	1st	+20.54	Won
2019	Representative (Laguna–3rd)	Nacionalista	214,899	95.76%	1st	+24.64	Won
2022	Governor of Laguna	Nacionalista	630,232	41.62%	2nd	—N/a	Lost
2025	Governor of Laguna	AKAY	635,570	39.80%	1st	-1.82	Won

Political offices
Preceded by Ramil Hernandez	Governor of Laguna; 2025–present	Incumbent
House of Representatives of the Philippines
Preceded by Maria Evita Arago	Member of the House of Representatives from Laguna's 3rd district 2013–2022	Succeeded by Loreto Amante
