= Santa Rosa's at-large congressional district =

Congressional district in Santa Rosa, Philippines

- Constituency for the House of Representatives of the Philippines
- Map of Laguna showing the location of Santa Rosa.
- City: Santa Rosa
- Province: Laguna, Calabarzon
- Population: 414,812 (2020)
- Electorate: 231,659 (2025)
- Major settlements: Santa Rosa
- Area: 54.84 km^{2} (21.17 sq mi)

Current constituency
- Created: 2019
- Representative: Roy Gonzales
- Political party: PFP
- Congressional bloc: Majority

Santa Rosa's at-large congressional district is the congressional district of the Philippines in Santa Rosa. It has been represented in the House of Representatives of the Philippines since 2022. Previously included in Laguna's 1st congressional district, it includes all barangays of the city. It is currently represented in the 20th Congress by Roy Gonzales of the Partido Federal ng Pilipinas (PFP).

== Representation history ==
#	Member		Term of office		Congress	Party	Electoral history
#	Image	Name	Start	End	Congress	Party	Electoral history
District created August 22, 2019.
1		Danilo Ramon S. Fernandez (born 1966)	June 30, 2022	June 30, 2025	19th	NUP	Redistricted from Laguna's 1st district and re-elected in 2022.
2		Roy Gonzales (born 1971)	June 30, 2025	Incumbent	20th	Lakas	Elected in 2025.
2		Roy Gonzales (born 1971)	June 30, 2025	Incumbent	20th	PFP	Elected in 2025.

== Election results ==
=== 2025 ===
Candidate	Party	Votes	%
Roy Gonzales	Lakas–CMD	86,177	49.36
Danzel Fernandez	National Unity Party	60,441	34.62
Sonia Algabre	Akay National Political Party	27,958	16.01
Total		174,576	100.00
Registered voters/turnout		231,659	–
Lakas–CMD gain from National Unity Party			

=== 2022 ===
2022 Philippine House of Representatives election in the Santa Rosa's lone district
Party	Candidate	Votes	%
NUP	Dan Fernandez	104,772	64.09
KBL	Boy Factoriza	58,704	35.91
Valid ballots		163,476	89.5
Invalid or blank votes		19,169	10.5
Total votes		182,645	100.00
NUP win (new seat)			

== See also ==
- Legislative district of Santa Rosa
