= Laguna's 3rd congressional district =

Legislative district of the Philippines

- Constituency for the House of Representatives of the Philippines
- Interactive map of district boundaries
- Location of Laguna within the Philippines
- Province: Laguna
- Region: Calabarzon
- Population: 611,539 (2024)
- Electorate: 343,966 (2022)
- Major settlements: 7 LGUs: Cities; San Pablo; Municipalities; Alaminos; Calauan; Liliw; Nagcarlan; Rizal; Victoria
- Area: 487.87 km^{2} (188.37 sq mi)

Current constituency
- Created: 1987
- Representative: Loreto Amante
- Political party: PFP
- Congressional bloc: Majority

Laguna's 3rd congressional district is one of the seven congressional districts of the Philippines in the province of Laguna. It has been represented in the House of Representatives of the Philippines since 1987. The district consists of the city of San Pablo and adjacent municipalities of Alaminos, Calauan, Liliw, Nagcarlan, Rizal and Victoria bordering Batangas and Quezon. It is currently represented in the 20th Congress by Loreto Amante of the Partido Federal ng Pilipinas.

== Representation history ==
#	Image	Member	Term of office		Congress	Party	Electoral history	Constituent LGUs
#	Image	Member	Start	End	Congress	Party	Electoral history	Constituent LGUs
=== Laguna's 3rd district for the House of Representatives of the Philippines ===
District created February 2, 1987.
1		Florante L. Aquino (1950–2018)	June 30, 1987	June 30, 1998	8th	PDP–Laban	Elected in 1987.	1987–present Alaminos, Calauan, Liliw, Nagcarlan, Rizal, San Pablo, Victoria
1		Florante L. Aquino (1950–2018)	June 30, 1987	June 30, 1998	9th	LDP	Re-elected in 1992.	1987–present Alaminos, Calauan, Liliw, Nagcarlan, Rizal, San Pablo, Victoria
1		Florante L. Aquino (1950–2018)	June 30, 1987	June 30, 1998	10th	Lakas	Re-elected in 1995.	1987–present Alaminos, Calauan, Liliw, Nagcarlan, Rizal, San Pablo, Victoria
2		Danton Q. Bueser (born 1951)	June 30, 1998	June 30, 2007	11th	Liberal	Elected in 1998.	1987–present Alaminos, Calauan, Liliw, Nagcarlan, Rizal, San Pablo, Victoria
2		Danton Q. Bueser (born 1951)	June 30, 1998	June 30, 2007	12th	Liberal	Re-elected in 2001.	1987–present Alaminos, Calauan, Liliw, Nagcarlan, Rizal, San Pablo, Victoria
2		Danton Q. Bueser (born 1951)	June 30, 1998	June 30, 2007	13th	Liberal	Re-elected in 2004.	1987–present Alaminos, Calauan, Liliw, Nagcarlan, Rizal, San Pablo, Victoria
3		Maria Evita R. Arago (born 1975)	June 30, 2007	June 30, 2013	14th	Liberal	Elected in 2007.	1987–present Alaminos, Calauan, Liliw, Nagcarlan, Rizal, San Pablo, Victoria
3		Maria Evita R. Arago (born 1975)	June 30, 2007	June 30, 2013	15th	Liberal	Re-elected in 2010.	1987–present Alaminos, Calauan, Liliw, Nagcarlan, Rizal, San Pablo, Victoria
4		Sol Aragones (born 1977)	June 30, 2013	June 30, 2022	16th	UNA	Elected in 2013.	1987–present Alaminos, Calauan, Liliw, Nagcarlan, Rizal, San Pablo, Victoria
4		Sol Aragones (born 1977)	June 30, 2013	June 30, 2022	17th	UNA	Re-elected in 2016.	1987–present Alaminos, Calauan, Liliw, Nagcarlan, Rizal, San Pablo, Victoria
4		Sol Aragones (born 1977)	June 30, 2013	June 30, 2022	18th	Nacionalista	Re-elected in 2019.	1987–present Alaminos, Calauan, Liliw, Nagcarlan, Rizal, San Pablo, Victoria
5		Loreto Amante (born 1982)	June 30, 2022	Incumbent	19th	PDP–Laban	Elected in 2022.	1987–present Alaminos, Calauan, Liliw, Nagcarlan, Rizal, San Pablo, Victoria
5		Loreto Amante (born 1982)	June 30, 2022	Incumbent	20th	Lakas	Re-elected in 2025.	1987–present Alaminos, Calauan, Liliw, Nagcarlan, Rizal, San Pablo, Victoria
5		Loreto Amante (born 1982)	June 30, 2022	Incumbent	20th	PFP	Re-elected in 2025.	1987–present Alaminos, Calauan, Liliw, Nagcarlan, Rizal, San Pablo, Victoria

== Election results ==
=== 1992 ===
1992 Philippine House of Representatives elections
Party	Candidate	Votes	%
LDP	Florante Aquino	51,246	43.34
Nacionalista	Valeriano Plantilla	24,059	20.35
LP–PDP	Ramon De Roma	20,856	17.64
Lakas	Reynaldo Pineda	9,689	8.19
NPC	Virgilio Gesmundo	8,669	7.33
PRP	Marty Desphy	3,639	3.08
KBL	Abelardo Ardez	81	0.07
Total votes		118,239	100.00

=== 1995 ===
1995 Philippine House of Representatives elections
Party	Candidate	Votes	%
Lakas	Florante Aquino	74,835	55.86%
LDP	Dolores Potenciano	43,821	32.71%
NPC	Nelson Agapay	15,316	11.43%
Total votes		133,972	100.00

=== 1998 ===
1998 Philippine House of Representatives elections
Party	Candidate	Votes	%
Liberal	Danton Bueser	51,830	32.24%
Lakas	Dolores Potenciano	46,236	28.76%
LAMMP	Cesar Dizon	34,508	21.46%
Reporma	Arcadio Gapangada Jr.	24,467	15.22%
PROMDI	Conrado Manicad	3,746	2.33%
Total votes		160,787	100.00
Liberal gain from Lakas			

=== 2001 ===
2001 Philippine House of Representatives elections
Party	Candidate	Votes	%
Liberal	Danton Bueser	89,065	61.98%
Lakas	Vicente Amante	54,623	38.02%
Total votes		143,688	100.00
Liberal hold			

=== 2004 ===
2004 Philippine House of Representatives elections
Party	Candidate	Votes	%
Liberal	Danton Bueser	143,377	87.93%
KNP	Conrado Manicad	19,687	12.07%
Total votes		163,064	100.00
Liberal hold			

=== 2007 ===
2007 Philippine House of Representatives elections
Party	Candidate	Votes	%
Liberal	Maria Evita Arago	60,449	35.87%
NPC	Arcadio Gapangada Jr.	44,871	26.63%
Lakas	Florante Aquino	38,620	22.92%
KAMPI	Adoracion Alava	12,808	7.6%
KAMPI	Enrico Velasco	5,733	3.4%
Independent	Damaso Amante	5,313	3.15%
Independent	Andrew Atienza	732	0.43%
Total votes		168,526	100.00
Liberal hold			

=== 2010 ===
2010 Philippine House of Representatives elections
Party	Candidate	Votes	%
Liberal	Maria Evita Arago	123,638	61.64
NPC	Katherine Agapay	60,751	30.69
PMP	Florante Aquino	16,202	8.08
Valid ballots		200,591	94.85
Invalid or blank votes		10,895	5.15
Total votes		211,486	100.00
Liberal hold			

=== 2013 ===
2013 Philippine House of Representatives elections
Party	Candidate	Votes	%
UNA	Sol Aragones-Sampelo	92,273	50.58
Liberal	Maria Evita Arago (Incumbent)	81,764	44.82
PDP–Laban	Celia Lopez	8,386	4.60
Total votes		195,772	100.00
UNA gain from Liberal			

=== 2016 ===
2016 Philippine House of Representatives elections
Party	Candidate	Votes	%
UNA	Sol Aragones-Sampelo	154,339	71.12
Liberal	Florante Aquino	40,783	18.79
NPC	Damaso Amante	19,938	9.18
Lakas	Maria Christina Villamor	1,923	0.88
Total votes		216,983	100.00
UNA hold			

=== 2019 ===
2019 Philippine House of Representatives elections
Party	Candidate	Votes	%
Nacionalista	Sol Aragones-Sampelo	214,899	95.76
Independent	Ma. Cristina Villamor	6,078	2.69
Independent	King Mediano	3,508	1.55
Total votes		224,375	100.00
Nacionalista hold			

=== 2022 ===
2022 Philippine House of Representatives elections
Party	Candidate	Votes	%
PDP–Laban	Loreto Amante	197,324	72.76
PROMDI	Angelica Jones Alarva	68,044	25.09
Aksyon	Ma. Cristina Villamor	3,778	1.39
Independent	King Mediano	2,053	0.76
Total votes		271,199	100.00
PDP–Laban gain from Nacionalista			

=== 2025 ===
2025 Philippine House of Representatives election in Laguna 3rd district
Party	Candidate	Votes	%
Lakas	Loreto Amante (Incumbent)	238,140	86.38
RP	Empelight Empemano	28,730	10.42
Independent	Ronnie Masirag	4,697	1.70
Independent	Ocha Mamaril	4,106	1.49
Total votes		275,673	100
Lakas hold			

== See also ==
- Legislative districts of Laguna
