= City College of Calamba =

Public college in Laguna, Philippines

- Dalubhasaan ng Lungsod ng Calamba (Filipino)
- Seal
- Motto: Social Responsibility-National Servitude-Moral Uprightness
- Type: Public higher education institution
- Established: 2006; 20 years ago
- Chairman: Roseller Rizal
- President: Ronald Gonzales
- Location: Calamba, Laguna, Philippines; 14°12′44″N 121°10′03″E
- Campus: Urban
- Website: ccc.edu.ph
- Location in Laguna Location in Luzon Location in the Philippines

City College of Calamba (CCC) is a public college in Calamba, Laguna established in 2006. The institution was founded to provide education to the underprivileged. It is also subsidized by the city government and offers free tuition.

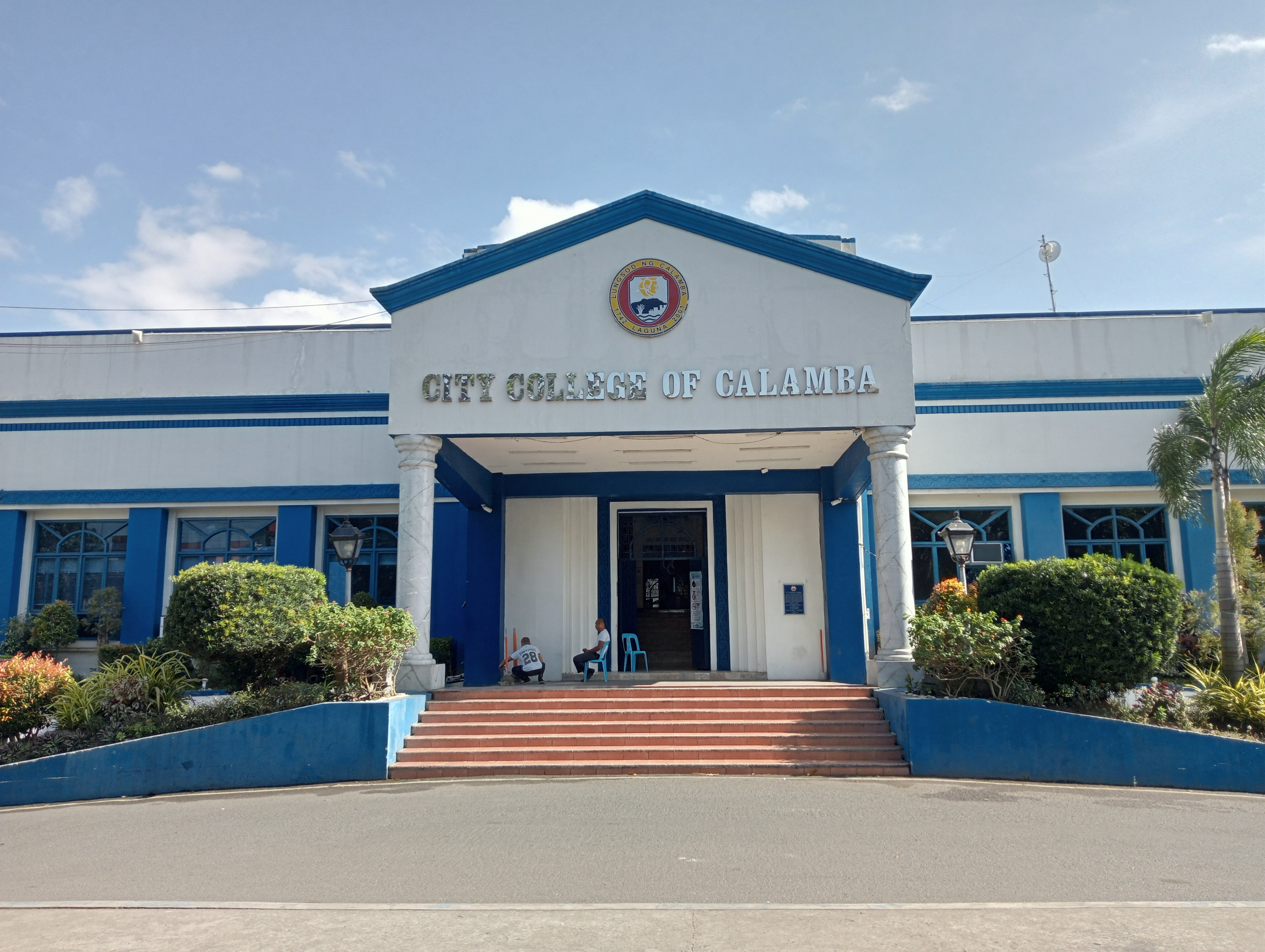
Campus

City College of Calamba has degree programs in the fields of accountancy, computer science, early childhood, primary and secondary education, and psychology.
