= Vincent Soriano =

Filipino politician and educator

The Honourable Vincent Soriano

Mayor of Pakil, Laguna
- In office June 30, 2016 – June 30, 2025
- Vice Mayor: Melody Famillara (2016-2019); Vipops Charles D. Martinez (2019-)
- Preceded by: Vipops Charles D. Martinez

Member of the Laguna Provincial Board from the 4th district
- In office June 30, 2001 – June 30, 2004

Vice Mayor of Pakil, Laguna
- In office 1998–2001

Municipal Councilor of Pakil, Laguna
- In office 1995–1998

Personal details
- Born: Vincent Ludovico Soriano; September 7, 1976 (age 49) Santa Cruz, Laguna, Philippines
- Party: PDP–Laban
- Other political affiliations: Liberal (2004)
- Spouse: Myrna Hernandez
- Education: University of the Philippines Los Banos
- Occupation: Politician, teacher

Vincent Ludovico Soriano (born September 7, 1976) is a Filipino politician and educator who serves as Municipal Mayor of Pakil, Laguna. He was a former Sangguniang Kabataan (SK) Chairman and ex-officio Municipal Councilor, Vice Mayor, and Provincial Board Member of Laguna.

== Early life and career ==
Soriano graduated with a degree in sociology, cum laude, from the University of the Philippines Los Banos in 1996. Later that year, he was selected to represent the Philippines as Youth Ambassador to the 23rd Ship for Southeast Asian and Japanese Youth Program (SSEAYP). As an active youth leader, he was awarded the Most Outstanding Youth of Laguna by Gawad Laguna, Inc. in 1997.

In 2014, he finished his master's degree in Development Management and Governance in the University of the Philippines Los Banos. He is a member of the Upsilon Sigma Phi.

Outside politics, Soriano taught sociology, politics, and governance at the De La Salle-College of St. Benilde from 2010 to 2016.

== Political career ==
In 1995, Soriano was elected Chairman of the Sangguniang Kabataan Municipal Federation, making him an ex-officio member of the municipal council until 1998.

In 1998, he was elected Municipal Vice Mayor of Pakil, Laguna and was the youngest elected Vice Mayor in the country at age 21. In 2001, he was elected Provincial Board Member representing the Fourth District of Laguna. He served as Chief of Staff of Laguna Governor Ramil Hernandez from 2014 to 2015. From 2015 to 2018, he also served as a member of the Laguna Water Board of Directors.

In 2016, he was elected to his first term as Municipal Mayor of Pakil, Laguna. Under his first term, Pakil became the first municipality in the province of Laguna and the whole Calabarzon region to enact a Freedom of Information (FOI) ordinance. He was re-elected Municipal Mayor in 2019 and 2022.
