= Loreto Amante =

Filipino politician (born 1982)

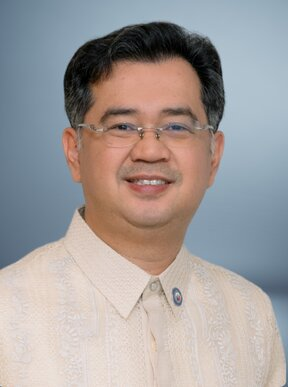
- Official portrait, 2026

Member of Philippine House of Representatives for Laguna's 3rd district
- Incumbent
- Assumed office June 30, 2022
- Preceded by: Sol Aragones
House positions
Chair of the House Special Committee on Southern Tagalog Development
Incumbent
Assumed office May 20, 2026
Preceded by	Ramil Hernandez

Mayor of San Pablo, Laguna
- In office June 30, 2013 – June 30, 2022
- Vice Mayor: Justin Colago (2019–2022); Angelita Yang (2013–2019)
- Preceded by: Vicente Amante
- Succeeded by: Vicente Amante

Personal details
- Born: Loreto Sahagun Amante; September 1, 1982 (age 44) San Pablo, Laguna, Philippines
- Party: PFP (2026–present)
- Other political affiliations: Lakas (2023–2026); PDP–Laban (2022–2023); Nacionalista (2019–2022); UNA (2013–2019)
- Spouse: Claudette Janolino
- Relatives: Vicente Amante (father)
- Education: De La Salle–College of Saint Benilde (AB)
- Nickname: Amben

Loreto "Amben" Sahagun Amante (born September 1, 1982) is a Filipino politician who has served as the representative for the Laguna's 3rd congressional district in the Philippine House of Representatives since 2022. Currently a member of the Partido Federal ng Pilipinas, he previously served as mayor of San Pablo, Laguna from 2013 to 2022.

== Early life and education ==
Loreto Sahagun Amante was born on September 1, 1982, in San Pablo, Laguna. He attended De La Salle–College of Saint Benilde, where he earned a Bachelor of Arts degree in Consular and Diplomatic Affairs.

== Mayor of San Pablo, Laguna (2013–2022) ==
Amante began his political career with his election as mayor of San Pablo, Laguna, in 2013, under the United Nationalist Alliance, succeeding his father, Vicente Amante. He was re-elected twice, in 2016 and 2019, when he joined the Nacionalista Party.

He endorsed Manny Pacquiao's presidential bid in 2022.

== House of Representatives (2022–present) ==
In 2022, Amante ran for Laguna's 3rd congressional district seat under PDP–Laban and defeated actress and incumbent provincial board member Angelica Jones and two other candidates in a landslide victory. He was re-elected in 2025 after joining Lakas–CMD in September 2023.

During the 20th Congress, Amante was elected chairman of the House Special Committee on Southern Tagalog Development on May 20, 2026, replacing fellow Laguna representative Ramil Hernandez.

=== Committee membership ===
==== 20th Congress ====
- Special Committee on Southern Tagalog Development (Chair)
- Committee on Appropriations (Vice Chair)
- Committee on Government Reorganization (Vice Chair)
- Committee on Senior Citizens (Vice Chair)
- Committee on Agriculture and Food
- Committee on Constitutional Amendments
- Committee on Dangerous Drugs
- Committee on Good Government and Public Accountability
- Committee on Health
- Committee on Higher and Technical Education
- Committee on Justice
- Committee on Tourism
- Committee on Youth and Sports Development

== Electoral history ==
Electoral history of Loreto Amante
Year	Office	Party	Votes received				Result
Year	Office	Party	Total	%	P.	Swing	Result
2013	Mayor of San Pablo, Laguna	UNA	59,449	61.06%	1st	—N/a	Won
2016	Mayor of San Pablo, Laguna	UNA	73,561	71.02%	1st	+9.96	Won
2019	Mayor of San Pablo, Laguna	Nacionalista	68,378	65.72%	1st	−5.30	Won
2022	Representative (Laguna–3rd)	PDP–Laban	197,324	72.76%	1st	—N/a	Won
2025	Representative (Laguna–3rd)	Lakas	238,140	86.38%	1st	+13.62	Won

House of Representatives of the Philippines
Preceded by Sol Aragones	Member of Philippine House of Representatives for Laguna's 3rd district 2022–present	Incumbent
Political offices
Preceded by Vicente Amante	Mayor of San Pablo, Laguna; 2013–2022	Succeeded by Vicente Amante
