= Vicente Amante =

Filipino politician

Mayor of San Pablo, Laguna
- In office June 30, 2022 – June 30, 2025
- Vice Mayor: Justin Colago
- Preceded by: Loreto Amante
- Succeeded by: Arcadio Gapangada Jr.
- In office June 30, 2004 – June 30, 2013
- Vice Mayor: Lauro Vidal (2004–07); Frederick Martin Ilagan (2007–10); Angelita Yang (2010–13)
- Preceded by: Florante Aquino
- Succeeded by: Loreto Amante
- In office June 30, 1992 – June 30, 2001
- Vice Mayor: Danton Bueser (1992–98); Leandro Castillo (1998–99); Lauro Vidal (1999–2001)
- Preceded by: Zacarias Ticzon
- Succeeded by: Florante Aquino

Personal details
- Born: Vicente Belen Amante; October 27, 1948 (age 77) San Pablo, Laguna, Philippines
- Party: Nacionalista (2012–present)
- Other political affiliations: Lakas–CMD (1991–2003, 2009-2012); LDP (2003-2006); NPC (2006–2009)
- Spouse(s): Nercy Amante (m. 1970; death 2016) Gem Castillo
- Profession: Politician

Vicente Belen Amante (born October 27, 1948), commonly known as Vic Amante, is a Filipino politician who serves as the mayor of San Pablo, Laguna in the Philippines. He previously served in the same position from 1992 to 2001. He ran for congressman in the 3rd district of Laguna in 2001 but he lost by Danton Bueser and went hiatus in politics in just 3 years. He run again for mayor in 2004 and he won following year in 2007 and 2010 until 2013. He ran again in 2022 and he won until he lost in 2025 election by former 3rd district Board Member and Barangay Councilor Arcadio Gapangada Jr. He is the chairman of the board of trustees of the Pamantasan ng Lungsod ng San Pablo (PLSP).

Political offices
Preceded by Zacarias Ticzon	Mayor of San Pablo City; 1992-2001	Succeeded by Florante Aquino
Preceded by Florante Aquino	Mayor of San Pablo City; 2004-2013	Succeeded by Loreto Amante
Preceded by Loreto Amante	Mayor of San Pablo City; 2022-2025	Succeeded by Arcadio Gapangada Jr.
