= Gregor Gustav Adolf Tobler =

Swiss merchant, coffee planter, and writer in the Spanish Philippines (1834-1875)

- Born: May 15, 1834; Wolfhalden, Switzerland
- Died: September 28, 1875 (aged 41); British Hong Kong
- Other name: Don Gustavo Tobler hijo
- Notable work: Aventuras de Filipinas - Album Humoristico en 30 Hojas
- Spouse: Victoria Lanuza
- Children: Carmen Tobler, Emil Tobler
- Parents: Gustav Adolf Tobler (1802–1876) (father); Anna Barbara Kursteiner (1814–1869) (mother)

Gregor Gustav Adolf Tobler (1834–1875) was a Swiss merchant, artist, and naturalist. He immigrated to the Philippines (Spanish East Indies) and lived in Majayjay, Laguna, for over a decade. He adopted the Hispanic name Don Gustavo Tobler, married a local mestiza woman, published a humorous travel book, and owned a flourishing vast coffee plantation from 1862 until his death in 1875.

== Family ==
Gregor Gustav Adolf Tobler was born on May 15, 1834, in Wolfhalden, Switzerland, to his parents Gustav Adolf Tobler (1802–1876) and Anna Barbara Kursteiner (1814–1869). He was the eldest brother of Emil Tobler. He came from a prominent family of educators and merchants from Appenzell Ausserrhoden (Appenzell Outer Rhodes), Switzerland. His grandfather Johann Georg Gustav Tobler (1769–1843) was a Swiss pedagogue, educational reformist, school founder, and prolific writer. His father, Gustav Adolf Tobler, was also an educator, writer, and artist. Gustav Adolf Sr became the Canton School Director in Trogen for 15 years from 1842 to 1857. During that time, The Trogen Cantonal School (Kantonsschule Trogen) was considered the most influential and effective school system in eastern Switzerland. The school offered business and technical secondary education.

== Life and works ==
Around 1848, Tobler & Co., a business engaged in trading fabrics and other Swiss Appenzeller manufactured products, entered the Philippines through an agent company under Eugster, Labhart & Co. The business operated in Iloilo and later moved to Manila. With an increase in the number of Swiss merchants in the Philippines, the Swiss Honorary Consulate was established in 1862.

Don Gustavo obtained his Wolfhalden passport in 1858 and possibly traveled to the Philippines the same year. He came into the country as an apprentice merchant under Russell & Sturgis (Russell & Co.). The said company was an American firm based in Manila actively trading in China. Years later, Don Gustavo and his German associate set up a joint-venture business named Henkel, Tobler Co., a trading company with dealings in Hong Kong, Japan, and China. His merchant partner, Mr. H. Henken, managed their business operations in Manila, while Tobler handled business in Majayjay.

During his first arrival in Majayjay, the young immigrant was under the watch of Padre Maximo Rico. He stayed in the convent of Saint Gregory, the Great Parish Church of Majayjay, until he could live self-reliantly. The young immigrant met Señorita Victoria Lanuza, who was then residing in Pueblo de Magdalena, Laguna. In 1863, he married Señorita Victoria in Santa Cruz, Manila. Doña Victoria Lanuza (1842–1910) was a Spanish elite mestiza born in Guinobatan, Albay, and came from a well-known family in the Spanish community. The Lanuza's are allied families of the Ortigas and Olbes during the Old Spanish Manila. Their marriage begat two children named Carmen Lanuza (1864–1888) and Emil Lanuza (1870–1880). For unknown reasons, Doña Victoria Lanuza did not carry her husband's last name and maintained her Spanish surname.

== Legacy ==
Through the privilege given by the Spanish authorities, a piece of land on Mount Banahaw was granted for him to cultivate. His land property was located within Barrio Malinao, connecting Olla river to Barrio of Bukal and bounded on all sides by public roads with a combined total land size of 11 hectares. The foothill of Mt. Banahaw was a typical ground forest destined to become a magnificent coffee plantation. Don Gustavo raised the very first coffee tree in the shade of existing trees. He cultivated the land, planting seedlings and harvesting the crops in succession as demand arises. His family mansion was established in Majayjay, near a river, and was always open to travelers. It had a small museum that housed collections and preservation of birds, butterflies, reptiles, parasites, and dried plants.

On September 6, 1875, Don Gustavo Tobler left Manila intending to travel to China. It was not apparent whether his travel was business-related; he got ill while in transit or seeking medical treatment. He contracted a liver disease and died in British Hong Kong on September 28, 1875. His unexpected death at the age of 41 led to the neglect and abandonment of the vast coffee plantation. A typical coffee plantation would have a lifespan of about thirty years. Any untouched trees that survived in his plantation were possibly destroyed by the coffee rust and insect infestation that plagued the country between 1889 and 1891.

In 1874, before his death, he published his book Aventuras de Filipinas – Album Humoristico en 30 Hojas. The book is a comical depiction of the experiences and adventures of foreign travelers on the Philippine Island. It was published in St. Gallen, Switzerland, and lithographed by Johann Martin Seitz. The Filipinas Heritage Library has a digital version of the book available online. The book is considered a rare antique and values around $6,000. Its book cover is considered among the most brilliant in Philippine literature by Filipina historian Dr. May Jurilla

A specimen of his insect collection is preserved at the Senckenberg Natural History Museum in Frankfurt, Germany. His other works and illustrations were collected under the album "Vistas de Ylollo y Negros."
