= Saint Gregory the Great Parish Church (Majayjay) =

Roman Catholic church in Laguna, Philippines

Majayjay Church
- Minor Basilica and Parish of Saint Gregory the Great
- San Gregorio Magno Parish Church
- Basilika Menor at Parokya ni San Gregorio Magno (Filipino); Basílica Menor e Iglesia Parroquial de San Gregorio Magno (Spanish)
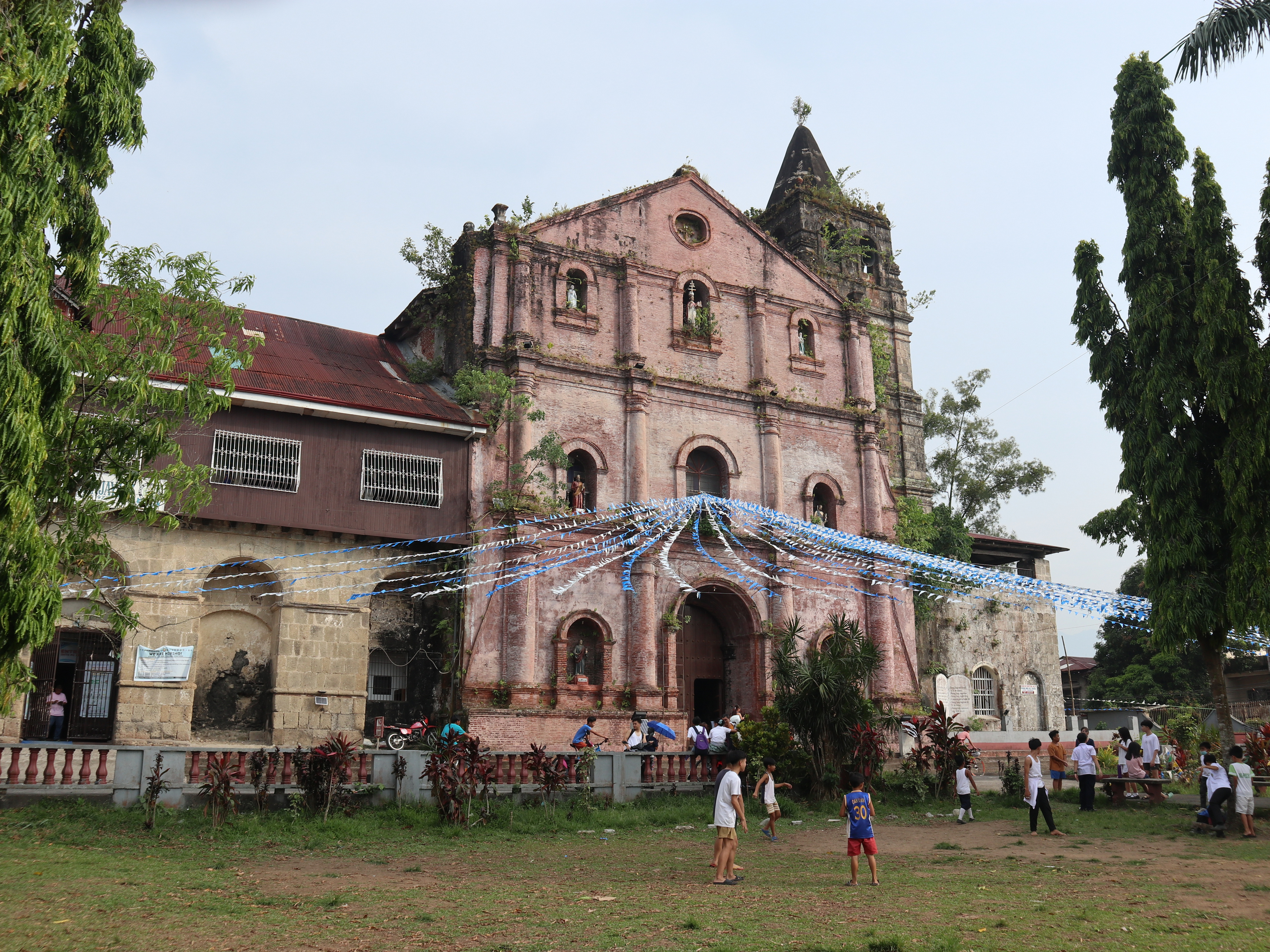
- Church facade in 2023

- Location in Laguna Location in Luzon Location in the Philippines
- 14°08′40″N 121°28′20″E
- Location: Majayjay, Laguna
- Country: Philippines
- Denomination: Roman Catholic

History
- Status: Minor Basilica
- Founded: 1571
- Founder(s): Juan de Plasencia and Diego Oropesa
- Dedication: Pope Gregory I

Architecture
- Functional status: Active
- Heritage designation: National Cultural Treasure
- Designated: 2001
- Architectural type: Church building
- Style: Baroque
- Groundbreaking: 1616
- Completed: 1649

Specifications
- Length: 60 metres (200 ft)
- Width: 17 metres (56 ft)
- Height: 16.5 metres (54 ft)
- Materials: Volcanic tuff, lumber, galvanized iron

Administration
- Province: Manila
- Metropolis: Manila
- Archdiocese: Manila
- Diocese: San Pablo
- Deanery: San Bartolome

Clergy
- Priest: Melchor Barcenas

The Minor Basilica and Parish of Saint Gregory the Great, commonly known as Majayjay Church, is a Minor Basilica and one of the oldest Roman Catholic churches in the Philippines located in the municipality of Majayjay in Laguna. It is under the jurisdiction of the Diocese of San Pablo. The church is recognized by the National Museum as a National Cultural Treasure (Level 1).

== History ==
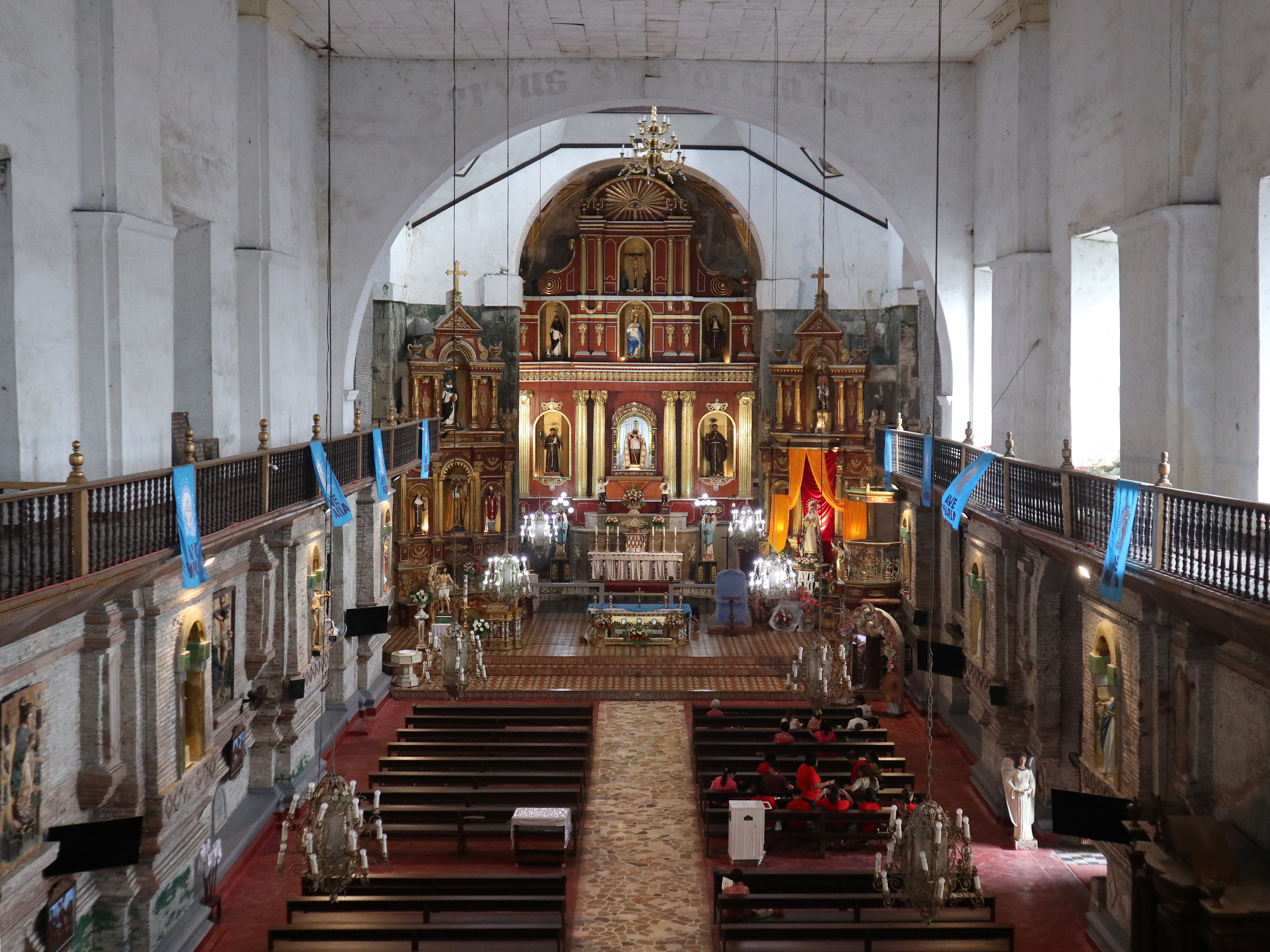
Church interior in 2023

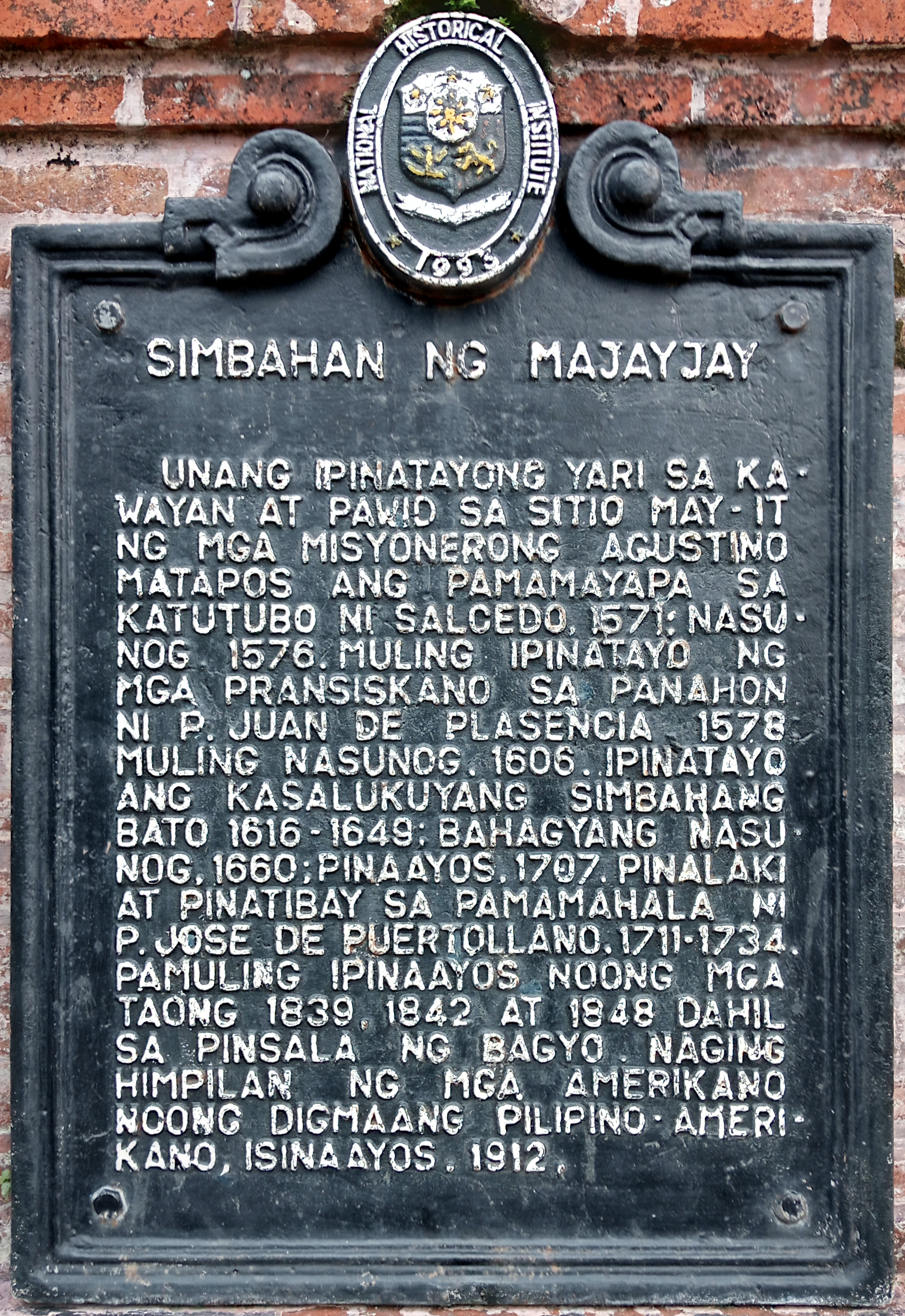
Church NHI historical marker installed in 1993

Majayjay served as the site of early Catholicism in Laguna. The Augustinians first came in 1568. Along with five Augustinian priests and Juan de Salcedo, nephew of Miguel López de Legazpi, they started to evangelize the sceptical townsmen led by Gat Yantok. In 1571, the Franciscans established a mission town with Don Gaspar Osorio, Agustín Osorio, Juan Osorio, Juan de Mendoza, Ventura Mag-olop, Aman Lingasan and Martín Siasip. The first church was constructed by locals in 1575 near the May-it river and was made of nipa and bamboo and was later burned in 1576. In 1578, Franciscans Juan de Plasencia and Diego Oropesa started to evangelize the town. A church, still of nipa and bamboo, was built that same year under the patronage of Saint Gregory the Great. Due to the lack of religious men, the first parish priest of Majajay, Antonio Nombela was only assigned in 1594. Under his pastorship, a long robe worn by wives to the church, called lambón was first used in the Philippines. In 1599, the Superior Gobierno authorized the construction of a stone church. While awaiting its construction, the makeshift church was burned in 1606. Majayjay also served as infirmary for the old religious men until 1606 before it was transferred to Lumban. Construction of the stone church began in 1616 and was completed in 1649 with the help of Maestro de Campo Don Buenaventura de Mendoza. The church was again partially burned in 1660. Rehabilitation started in 1711 and finished in 1730 by 14,000 people on forced labor and a rehabilitation cost of $26,000 by Jose de Puertollano. Instead of rebuilding the church, Puertollano decided to sandwich the ruins between two layers of brick resulting in an unusual wall thickness of 3 metres (9.8 ft). It took 19 years for the people of Majayjay to complete the church which was made of volcanic tuff with red tiles and prime lumber. On completion in 1730, the church became the biggest in the Philippines

A century later, the stone church was destroyed by a typhoon and was repaired in 1839, 1842 and 1848. The roof was replaced with galvanized iron in 1892 under the supervision of Gregorio Platero. During the American occupation, the church served as headquarters of the American army. Due to damage brought about by the wars against the Spanish and Americans, the church was again repaired in 1912.

In 1954, the church was placed under the government's rehabilitation program with the help of the National Conservation Society of the Philippines. In 2001, it was declared as a National Cultural Treasure by the National Museum.

On December 6, 2024, Bishop Marcelino Antonio Maralit petitioned the Holy See for the designation of the church as a Minor Basilica. On January 25, 2025, Pope Francis issued a decree granting the petition. This makes it the first Basilica in the Diocese of San Pablo.

== Features ==
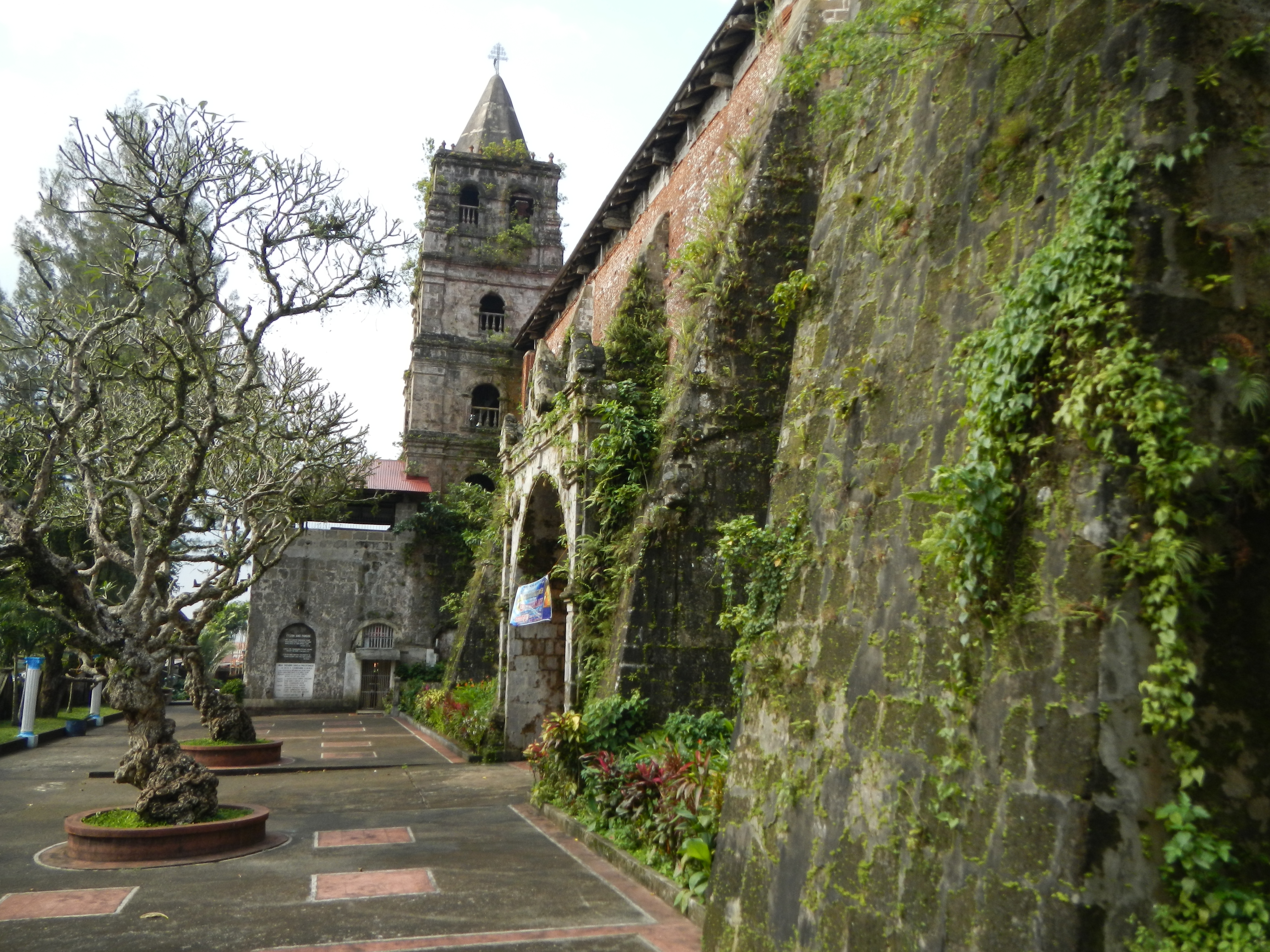
Church bell tower and buttresses

The Romanesque church of Majayjay is 60 metres (200 ft) long, 17 metres (56 ft) wide and 16.5 metres (54 ft) meters high. Its façade has three levels, each level scaled proportionally and topped by a triangular pediment with a circular window. The central nave consists of a huge wooden door of the main portal, choir loft windows and saint's niche. The interior contains a retablo mayor and four other minor retablos with intricate designs. The floor is tiled with azulejo and the walls have been preserved with some alterations. The five-storey square belltower with a conical roof and balustraded windows on each polygonal level is connected to the langit-langitan, a cat-walk above the ceiling which leads to the crossing over the transept. The belfry has arched windows each with a bell trimmed with finials and a large antique bell on top. It also has a large side door on the right side of the church.

Today, the church contains antique images of santos, reliquaries and century-old liturgical objects.

=== Convent ===
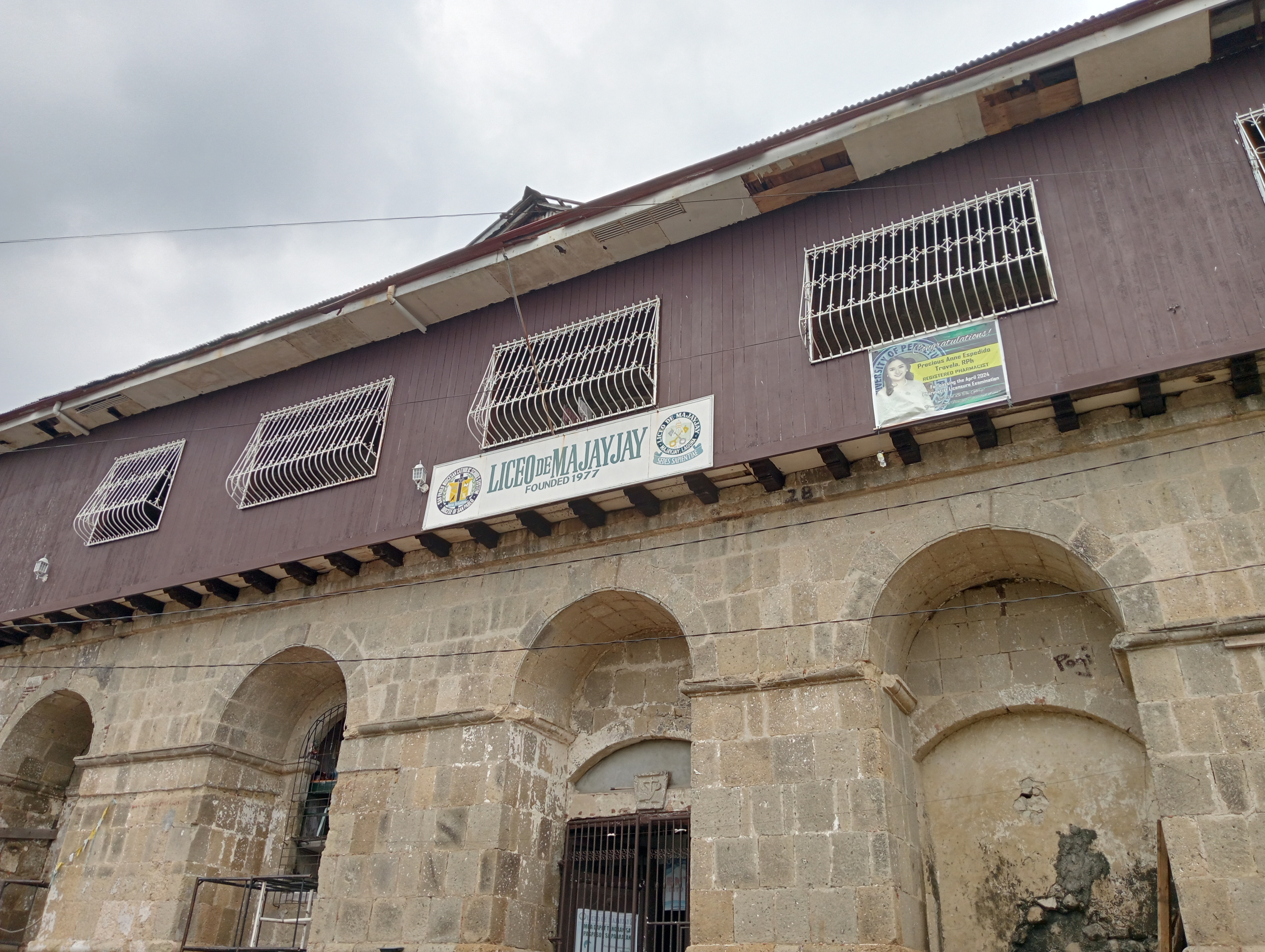
Liceo de Majayjay

The huge convent (also convento) of the church, which provides a good view of Laguna de Bay, is one of the best preserved conventos in the country and is the earliest surviving example of its kind. It houses a small museum of old parish documents and ecclesiastical silver. A small portion of the church was converted into the present-day Liceo de Majayjay, a Catholic school under the supervision of the local parish and the Diocesan Catholic School System of the Roman Catholic Diocese of San Pablo.

== Chapel of Nuestra Señora de la Porteria ==
The chapel of Nuestra Señora de la Porteria (Our Lady of the Gate) also known as the Ermita chapel was originally constructed as a tribunal during the Spanish period. The image of the Nuestra Señora de la Porteria, which was brought to Majayjay by Spanish missionaries in 1759, was enshrined in the former court building in 1760.

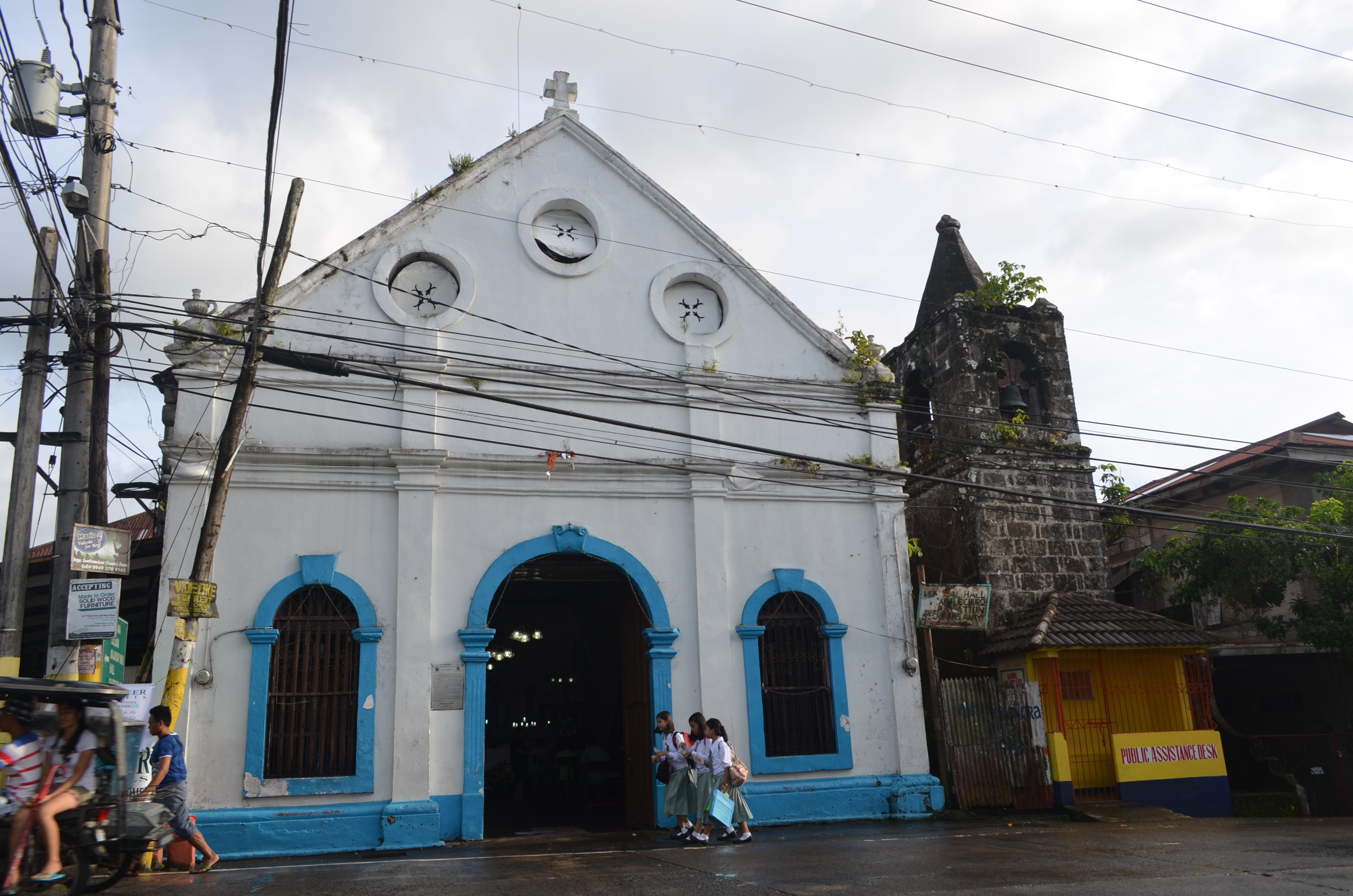
Chapel of Nuestra Señora de la Porteria (Ermita Chapel)

== In popular culture ==
The church was used as a setting for the 1976 Tatlong Taong Walang Diyos and 2003 film Lupe: A Seaman's Wife.

== Bibliography ==
- Huerta, Felix de (1865). Estado geográfico, topográfico, estadístico, histórico-religioso: de la santa y apostólica provincia de S. Gregorio Magno, de religiosos Menores descalzos de la regular y más estrecha observancia de N.S.P.S. Francisco, en las Islas Filipinas: comprende el número de religiosos, conventos, pueblos, situación de estos, años de su fundación, tributos, almas, producciones, industrias, cosas y casos especiales de su administración espiritual, en el archipiélago filipino, desde su fundación en el año de 1577 hasta el de 1865 [Geographical, topographical, statistical, historical and religious state of the holy and apostolic province of S. Gregorio Magno] (in Spanish). Binondo: Imprenta de M. Sanchez y Ca.
