= Juan de Plasencia =

Spanish friar of the Franciscan Order

Juan de Plasencia OFM
- Born: Juan Portocarrero; 1520; Plasencia, Extremadura, Spain
- Died: 1590 (aged 69–70); Lilio, Laguna, Captaincy General of the Philippines
- Known for: Doctrina Cristiana

Miguel Juan de Plasencia (Spanish: ['xwan de pla'senθja]) was a Spanish friar of the Franciscan Order. He was among the first group of Franciscan missionaries who arrived in the Philippines on 2 July 1578.

He spent most of his missionary life in the Philippines, where he founded numerous towns in Luzon and authored several religious and linguistic books, most notably the Doctrina Cristiana (Christian Doctrine), the first book ever printed in the Philippines.

== Early years ==
Juan de Plasencia was born in the early 16th century as Juan Portocarrero in Plasencia, in the region of Extremadura, Spain. He was one of the seven children of Pedro Portocarrero, a captain of a Spanish schooner.

Juan de Plasencia grew up during the period known as the Siglo de Oro, a Golden Age when arts and literature flourished in many parts of Spain, among them his native Extremadura.

It is not well known when or where he first entered the Order of the Franciscans. Some scholars point at the Convento de Villanueva de la Serena, in Plasencia, while others speculate that he might have traveled to Italy and joined a convent there, at a time when a large part of Italy was under Spanish rule. According to researchers, he took the habit as a young man at the Cloister of Saint Francis in Sorrento, Italy.

== Life in the Philippines ==
He is believed to have arrived to the Philippines on 2 July 1578, after a stopover in Mexico. As soon as he arrived, he joined forces with another missionary, Fray Diego de Oropesa, and they both started preaching around Laguna de Bay and Tayabas, Quezon, in Quezon Province, where he founded several towns.

During the following years they are also credited with the foundation of a large number of towns in the provinces of Bulacan, Laguna and Rizal, such as Tayabas, Caliraya, Lucban, Majayjay, Nagcarlan, Lilio (Liliw), Pila, Santa Cruz, Lumban, Pangil, Siniloan, Morong, Antipolo, Taytay, and Meycauayan.

As a friar, Juan de Plasencia lived up to his pledge, leading a lifestyle devoid of any luxury and in constant contact with the people he was trying to convert to Christianity. He was also known to be a defender of the native population, looking after the poor, ill, or neglected, and standing up for their rights on numerous occasions.

He was also very keen on creating primary schools, and requested official sanction for the creation of educational centers where "Filipinos could not only learn Christian doctrine, but also reading and writing, and some arts and crafts, so they would become after, not only good Christians but also useful citizens", an initiative that was approved by Domingo de Salazar, the first Bishop of the See of Manila (1512–1594).

== Written works ==
Juan de Plasencia wrote a number of books designed primarily to promote the understanding of both the Spanish language among the natives, and the local languages among the missionaries, to facilitate the task of spreading Christianity. He acknowledged at an early stage the need of mastering the language of the natives in order to facilitate evangelization, and in a letter to the King of Spain, dated 18 June 1585, he mentioned some of his works to that effect:

"In the language more common in these Islands, I have written some works like the "Arte de la lengua tagala" and "Declaracion de toda la doctrina Cristiana," and now I am writing the "Vocabulario." These are very necessary for all the ministers if they would only be printed. It would be particularly favorable if Your Majesty would send me a "cedula" so they could be sent for printing in Mexico at the expense of His Real Hacienda. It would be of great use for these souls."

He is the author of what is believed to be the first book printed in the Philippines, the Doctrina Cristiana, that was not only printed in Spanish, but also in Tagalog, in both Latin script and the commonly used Baybayin script of the natives of the time, and it even had a version in Hokkien Chinese.

Other works attributed to him are the "Relacion de las Costumbres de Los Tagalos" (1589), that not only helped understand and preserve many of the traditional ways of the local population, but also provided the first form of Civil Code, used by local governors to administer justice.

A mystical work which he entitled "La Santina", was an Opus number on prayer and contemplation entirely done in the Tagalog language so the natives who did not know Spanish could also engage in the spiritual exercises of their teachers.

== Death ==
Juan de Plasencia died in Liliw, Laguna in 1590. He was buried at the town's church.
