= Saint John the Baptist Parish Church (Liliw) =

Roman Catholic church in Laguna, Philippines

Liliw Church
- Saint John the Baptist Parish Church
- Simbahan ng Parokya ng San Juan Bautista (Filipino)
- Church façade in 2026

- Location in Laguna Location in Luzon Location in the Philippines
- 14°07′47″N 121°26′09″E
- Location: Liliw, Laguna
- Country: Philippines
- Denomination: Roman Catholic

History
- Status: Parish church
- Founded: 1578
- Founder: Venerable Juan de Plasencia
- Dedication: St. John the Baptist

Architecture
- Functional status: Active
- Architectural type: Church building
- Style: Baroque
- Groundbreaking: 1643
- Completed: 1646

Specifications
- Materials: Adobe, clay, bricks

Administration
- Province: Manila
- Metropolis: Manila
- Archdiocese: Manila
- Diocese: San Pablo
- Deanery: Bartholomew the Apostle

Clergy
- Vicar: none
- Priest: Rev. Fr. Emil Laraño

Saint John the Baptist Parish Church, commonly known as Liliw Church or Lilio Church, is one of the Roman Catholic churches in Liliw, Laguna, Philippines. It is under the jurisdiction of the Diocese of San Pablo. Its feast is celebrated every August 29 known as the Martyrdom of St. John the Baptist. The church is known for its red bricked façade and baroque style architecture.

== History ==
Church PHC historical marker installed in 1939

Liliw was established as a reduccion by Franciscan priests Juan de Plasencia and Diego Oropesa in 1578. It was annexed as a visita of Nagcarlan until it became an independent parish with Miguel de San Lucas as first parish priest in 1605 by the Franciscan missionaries. The first church was built in wood in 1620. A stronger stone church was built from 1643 to 1646 and was partially destroyed during the 1880 Luzon earthquake. It was reconstructed in 1885 and was partially burned on April 6, 1898.

== Architecture ==
The church, which is designed in baroque style, is adorned with red bricks.

=== Façade ===
The most prominent and notable part of the church is the façade is made of striking red bricks and adobe. On top of the wooden door entrance is a white sculpted image of the Baptism of Jesus by St. John the Baptist. It also contains stained glass images along with red bricked columns.

=== Retablos ===
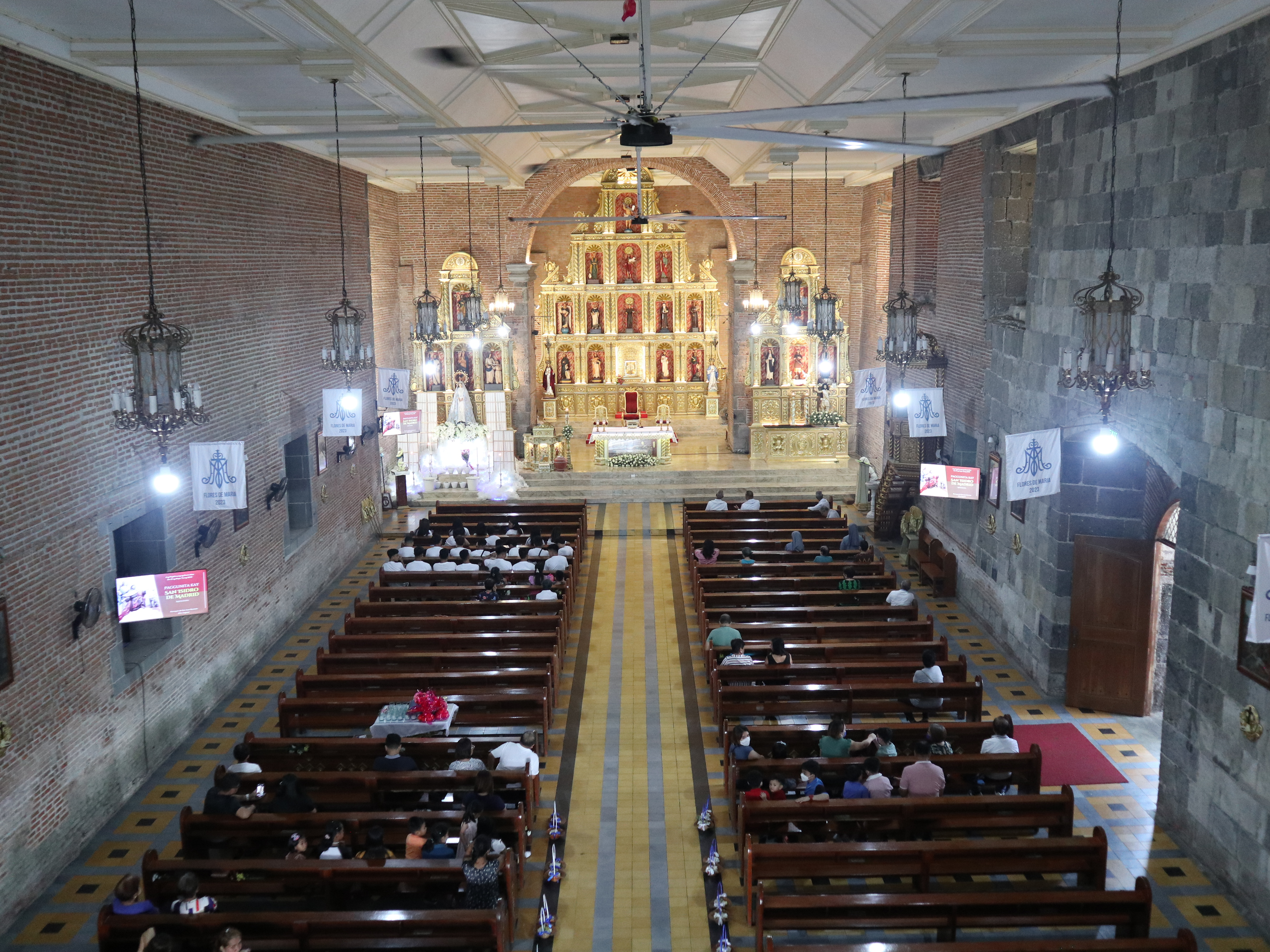
Church interior in 2023

The church has three retablos or altars finished in gold leaf. The retablo mayor (main altar) at the center contains thirteen niches across four levels housing statues of saints. At the center of the lowest level contains the tabernacle. The two minor retablos on each side houses four niches of saints. Originally, these two minor retablos were dedicated in honor of the town's second patron, San Buenaventura and San Antonio de Padua. On the first minor retablo at the left side are Saint Joseph at the top; Saint Joachim at the right sided bottom; Immaculate Conception at the middle bottom; and Saint Anne at the left sided bottom. The statue of Saint Lorenzo Ruiz is situated at the top of the minor retablo; Saint Therese of Lisieux at the left sided bottom; Saint Isidore the Laborer at the middle bottom; and Saint John Vianney at the right sided bottom. It was restored by following the description of a visiting friar through the efforts of Director Emmanuel Borlaza, Concepcion Brosas and the people of Liliw.

=== Capilla de San Buenaventura ===
From the church's entresuelo entrance, a small passageway to the left leads to a small chapel named in honor of the Seraphic Doctor, San Buenaventura through the efforts of Philip Atienza. At the center of the chapel is an image of San Buenaventura enclosed in a retablo with narra wood in the patio grounds as its material made by a Paete carver, Peter Paraiso. A first class relic was also housed in the chapel. In 1664, the image of San Buenaventura wept and sweated blood, with Padre Juan Pastor and 120 witnesses. On the right side of the church's entrance is the adoration chapel of the church. It was originally the baptisterio of the church. The original marble baptismal font was intact and kept inside the parish museum.

=== Church patio ===
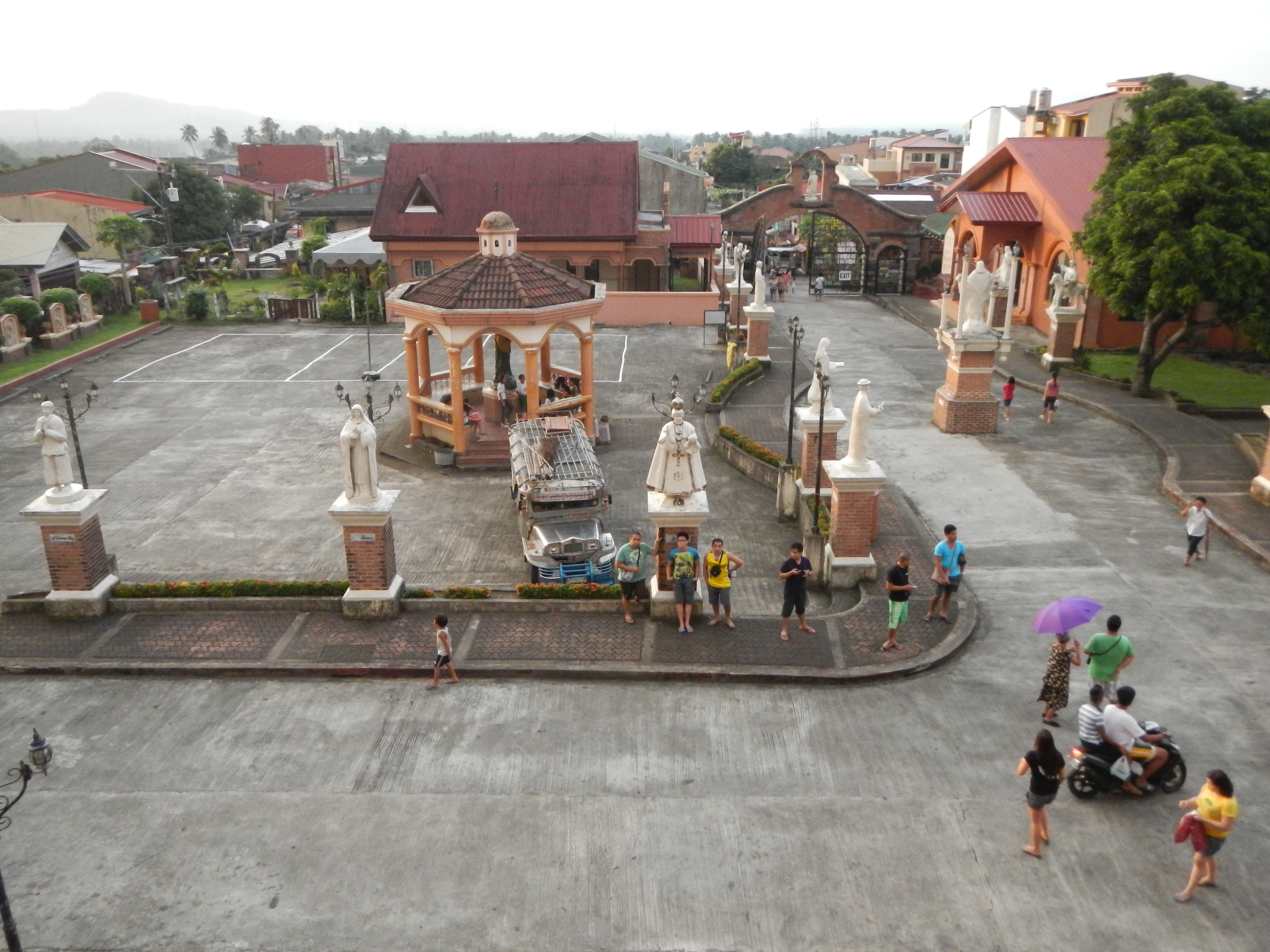
Church patio in 2013

The grounds outside the church have been developed to promote Christian teachings for pilgrims. At the middle of the patio is a white statue of the Sacred Heart of Jesus. On both sides are several elevated white statues of different saints patron of each barangay in the town. The church patio was named Patio de Sagrada Familia.

== Bibliography ==
- Huerta, Felix de (1865). Estado geográfico, topográfico, estadístico, histórico-religioso. Binondo: Imprenta de M. Sanchez y Ca.
