= Liliw =

Municipality in Laguna, Philippines

- Municipality
- Municipality of Liliw
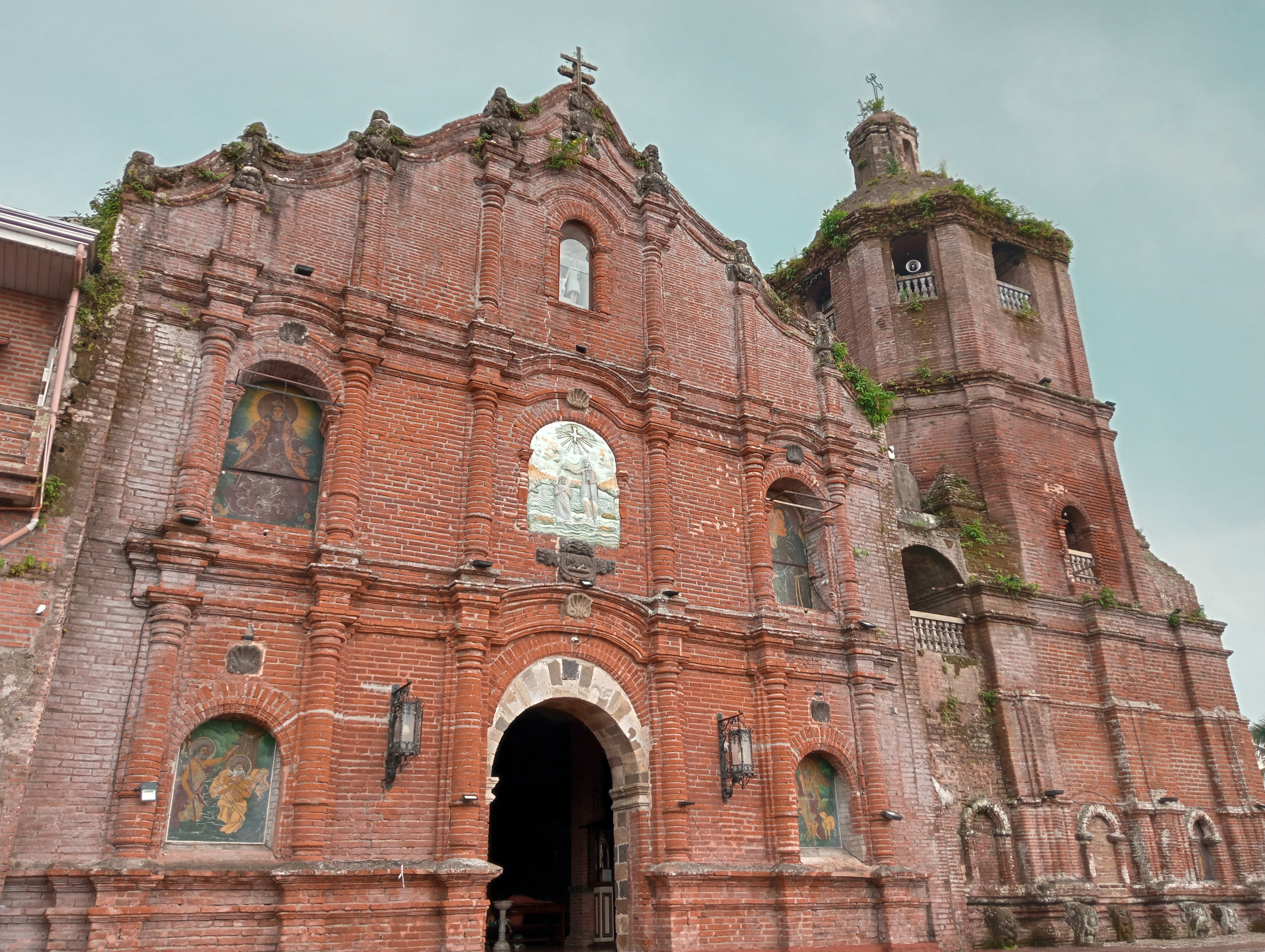
- Saint John the Baptist Parish Church Gat Tayaw Park Gat Tayaw Street

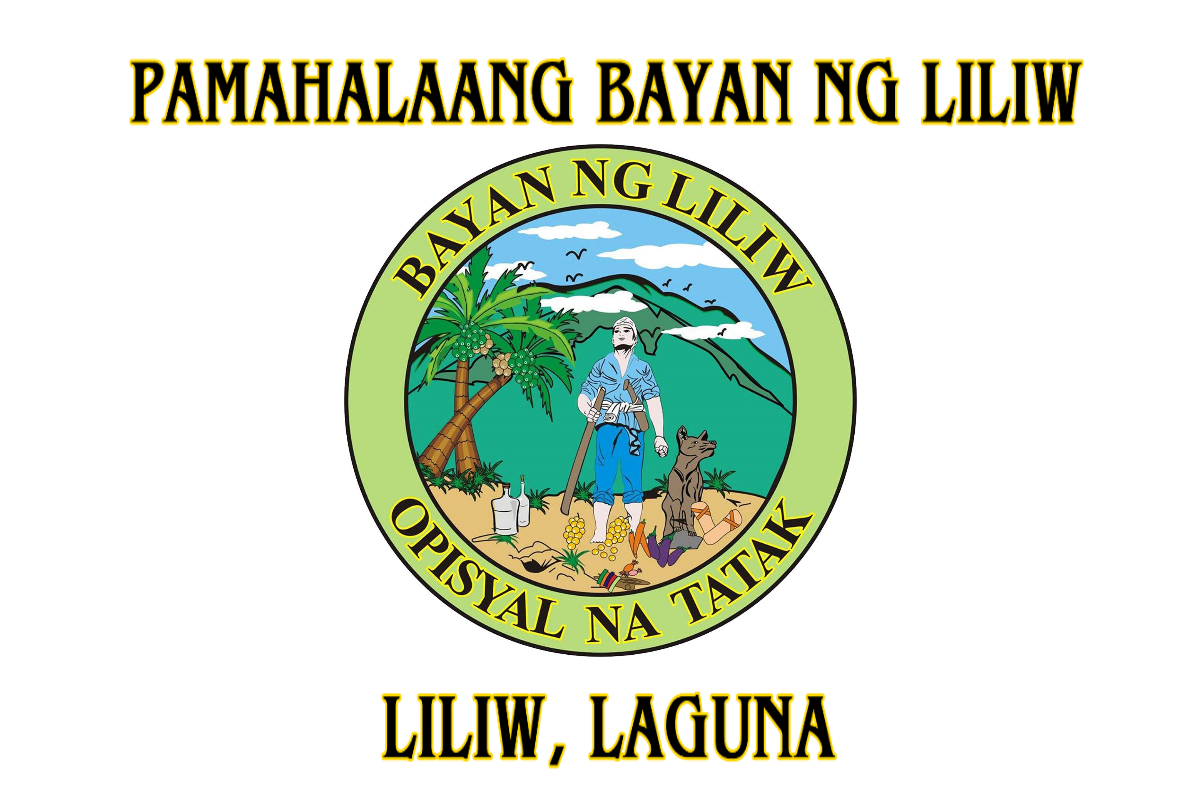
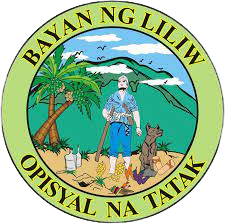
- Flag Seal
- Nickname: Flip-flops Capital of the Philippines
- Motto(s): "Baleng Ganda, Baleng Saya"
- Map of Laguna with Liliw highlighted
- Interactive map of Liliw
- Location within the Philippines
- Coordinates: 14°07′48″N 121°26′10″E
- Country: Philippines
- Region: Calabarzon
- Province: Laguna
- District: 3rd district
- Founded: August 29, 1571
- Barangays: 33 (see Barangays)

Government
  - Type: Sangguniang Bayan
  - Mayor: Ildefonso D. Monleon
  - Vice Mayor: Arnold A. Montesines
  - Representative: Loreto Amante
  - Municipal Council: Members: Joey C. Panaglima; Jeffrie P. Trillana; Maria Ayessa N. Ticzon; Arnulfo A. Lugada; James Cyrus D. Coligado; Deus A. Borlaza; Jobert A. Novenario; Lyca A. Leyma-Luna
  - Electorate: 25,797 voters (2025)

Area
  - Total: 39.10 km^{2} (15.10 sq mi)
- Elevation: 256 m (840 ft)
- Highest elevation: 2,173 m (7,129 ft)
- Lowest elevation: 13 m (43 ft)

Population (2024 census)
  - Total: 39,976
  - Density: 1,022/km^{2} (2,648/sq mi)
  - Households: 10,706

Economy
  - Income class: 3rd municipal income class
  - Poverty incidence: 8.79% (2023)
  - Revenue: ₱ 170.5 million (2024)
  - Assets: ₱ 401.2 million (2024)
  - Expenditure: ₱ 79.83 million (2024)
  - Liabilities: ₱ 90.83 million (2024)

Service provider
  - Electricity: Manila Electric Company (Meralco)
- Time zone: UTC+8 (PST)
- ZIP code: 4004
- PSGC: 0403410000
- IDD : area code: +63 (0)49
- Native languages: Tagalog
- Website: www.liliwlaguna.gov.ph

Liliw, officially the Municipality of Liliw (Tagalog: Bayan ng Liliw), is a municipality in the province of Laguna, Philippines. According to the 2024 census, it has a population of 39,976 people.

It is known for its cold water spring resorts, native homemade sweets and a sizeable shoe industry that rivals that of Marikina. The town is also known for its baroque church and its Liliw-style houses.

== History ==
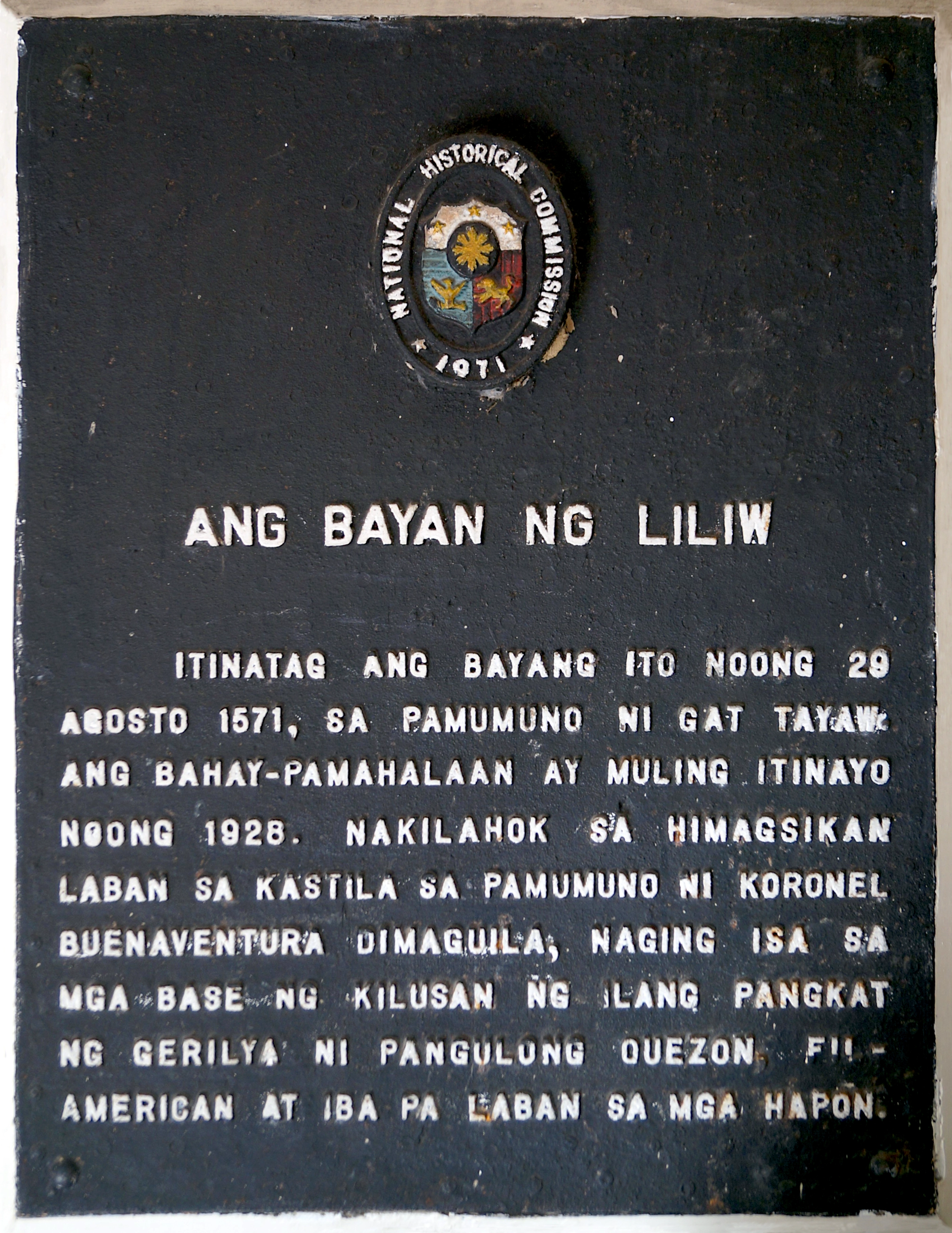
National historical marker installed in 1971 at the municipal hall

Founded in 1571 by Gat Tayaw, the small town of Liliw is nestled at the foot of Mount Banahaw, 17 kilometers (11 mi) away from Santa Cruz, Laguna's capital.

According to local tradition,Liliw derived its name from a bird. It is said that Gat Tayaw and his followers erected a bamboo pole and agreed to name the settlement after the first bird to alight on it within four days. A crow initially landed on the pole, but as it was considered a bad omen, the group relocated farther south and set up another pole. A more auspicious bird later perched on it and sang “liw, liw, liw,” from which the town’s name was derived.

This account is supported by the Tagalog dictionary compiled by Fr. Noceda and Fr. San Lucar, which includes the entry “lilio,” described as a type of bird from which the town in Laguna, then under Franciscan administration, takes its name.

The spelling of the town's name from Lilio was changed on June 11, 1965, when the municipal council passed Resolution No. 38-S-65, which declared "Liliw" as the official name and spelling of the town. This was to avoid confusion in pronouncing and spelling the town name.

== Geography ==
Liliw has a total land area of 3,910 hectares (9,700 acres). It borders Santa Cruz to the northwest, Magdalena to the northeast, Majayjay to the east, Nagcarlan to the west and Dolores in Quezon Province to the south. It is 56 kilometers (35 mi) from Santa Cruz and 101 kilometers (63 mi) from Manila.

It is one of the highland towns forming the southern extremity of Laguna. It is situated at the foot of Mount Banahaw.

=== Barangays ===
Liliw is politically subdivided into 33 barangays, as indicated below. Each barangay consists of puroks and some have sitios.

- Bagong Anyo (Poblacion)
- Bayate
- Bongkol
- Bubukal
- Cabuyew
- Calumpang
- San Isidro
- Culoy
- Dagatan
- Daniw
- Dita
- Ibabang Palina
- Ibabang San Roque
- Ibabang Sungi
- Ibabang Taykin
- Ilayang Palina
- Ilayang San Roque
- Ilayang Sungi
- Ilayang Taykin
- Kanlurang Bukal
- Laguan
- Luquin
- Malabo-Kalantukan
- Masikap (Poblacion)
- Maslun (Poblacion)
- Mojon
- Novaliches
- Oples
- Pag-asa (Poblacion)
- Palayan
- Rizal (Poblacion)
- San Isidro
- Silangang Bukal
- Tuy-Baanan

=== Climate ===
Climate data for Liliw, Laguna
Month	Jan	Feb	Mar	Apr	May	Jun	Jul	Aug	Sep	Oct	Nov	Dec	Year
Mean daily maximum °C (°F)	25 (77)	27 (81)	28 (82)	30 (86)	30 (86)	29 (84)	28 (82)	28 (82)	27 (81)	27 (81)	27 (81)	25 (77)	28 (82)
Mean daily minimum °C (°F)	19 (66)	18 (64)	19 (66)	21 (70)	22 (72)	23 (73)	22 (72)	22 (72)	22 (72)	21 (70)	21 (70)	20 (68)	21 (70)
Average precipitation mm (inches)	52 (2.0)	35 (1.4)	27 (1.1)	27 (1.1)	82 (3.2)	124 (4.9)	163 (6.4)	144 (5.7)	145 (5.7)	141 (5.6)	100 (3.9)	102 (4.0)	1,142 (45)
Average rainy days	12.0	8.1	8.8	9.7	17.9	22.6	26.2	24.5	24.6	22.0	16.7	14.9	208
Source: Meteoblue

== Demographics ==
Population census of Liliw
Year	Pop.	±% p.a.
1903	4,669	—
1918	6,306	+2.02%
1939	7,588	+0.89%
1948	7,977	+0.56%
1960	11,064	+2.76%
1970	14,638	+2.84%
1975	15,907	+1.68%
1980	17,436	+1.85%
1990	21,911	+2.31%
1995	24,434	+2.06%
2000	27,537	+2.60%
2007	32,727	+2.41%
2010	33,851	+1.24%
2015	36,582	+1.49%
2020	39,491	+1.62%
2024	39,976	+0.29%
Source: Philippine Statistics Authority

In the 2024 census, the population of Liliw was 39,976 people, with a density of 1,000 inhabitants per square kilometer or 2,600 inhabitants per square mile.

== Economy ==
Poverty incidence of Liliw (%)

Source: Philippine Statistics Authority

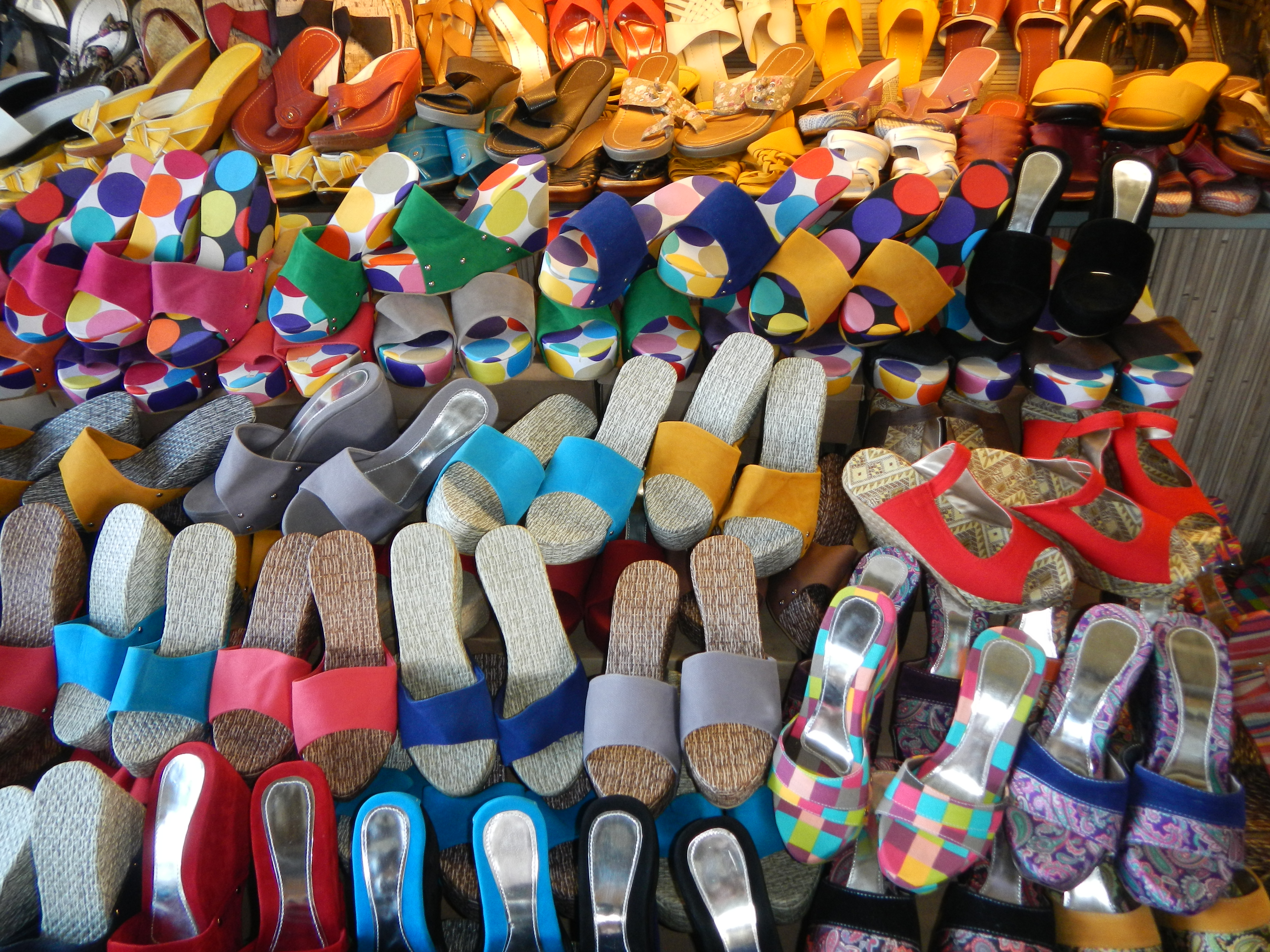
Slippers of Liliw

The town's main attraction is its growing footwear industry. It started in 1931 when Casiano Pisueña became interested in making slippers. His first prototype was made from coconut husk and rubber from tire interiors. He soon became successful, and many residents of Liliw followed suit. At present, there are about 50 footwear stores in Liliw. The regular slippers are still the most popular, but many stores now sell shoes, handbags and other leather goods. Most stores still carry the three-for-P100 slippers. The annual Tsinelas Festival is celebrated every end of April.

== Government ==
The local government is currently undertaking measures to conserve its cultural heritage sites and has proposed enacting legislation that would mandate the usage of Liliw-style architecture as the only means of construction and reconstruction in the town. If the ordinance passes, Liliw will have a greater chance of becoming a heritage town and further support from the National Commission for Culture and the Arts.

== Transportation ==
Tricycles and jeepneys are popular modes of transportation in Liliw. Buses are available to Santa Cruz, Calamba and Metro Manila.

== Religion ==
The town's main Roman Catholic church is the Saint John the Baptist Parish Church, whose current structure was built during the 19th century. It is also the burial place of Spanish missionary Juan de Plasencia.

== Education ==
The Liliw Schools District Office governs all educational institutions within the municipality. It oversees the management and operations of all private and public, from primary to secondary schools.

=== Primary and elementary schools ===
- Calumpang Elementary School
- Daniw Elementary School
- Francisco S. Brosas Memorial Elementary School
- Liliw Central Elementary School
- Maranatha Christian Academy
- Mojon Elementary School
- Novaliches Elementary School
- Pag-asa Elementary School
- Sanctuario de San Antonio Children Learning Center
- School of Saint John Bosco
- Taykin Elementary School

=== Secondary schools ===
- Liliw National High School
- Liliw Senior High School
- School of Saint John Bosco (High school)

== Gallery ==
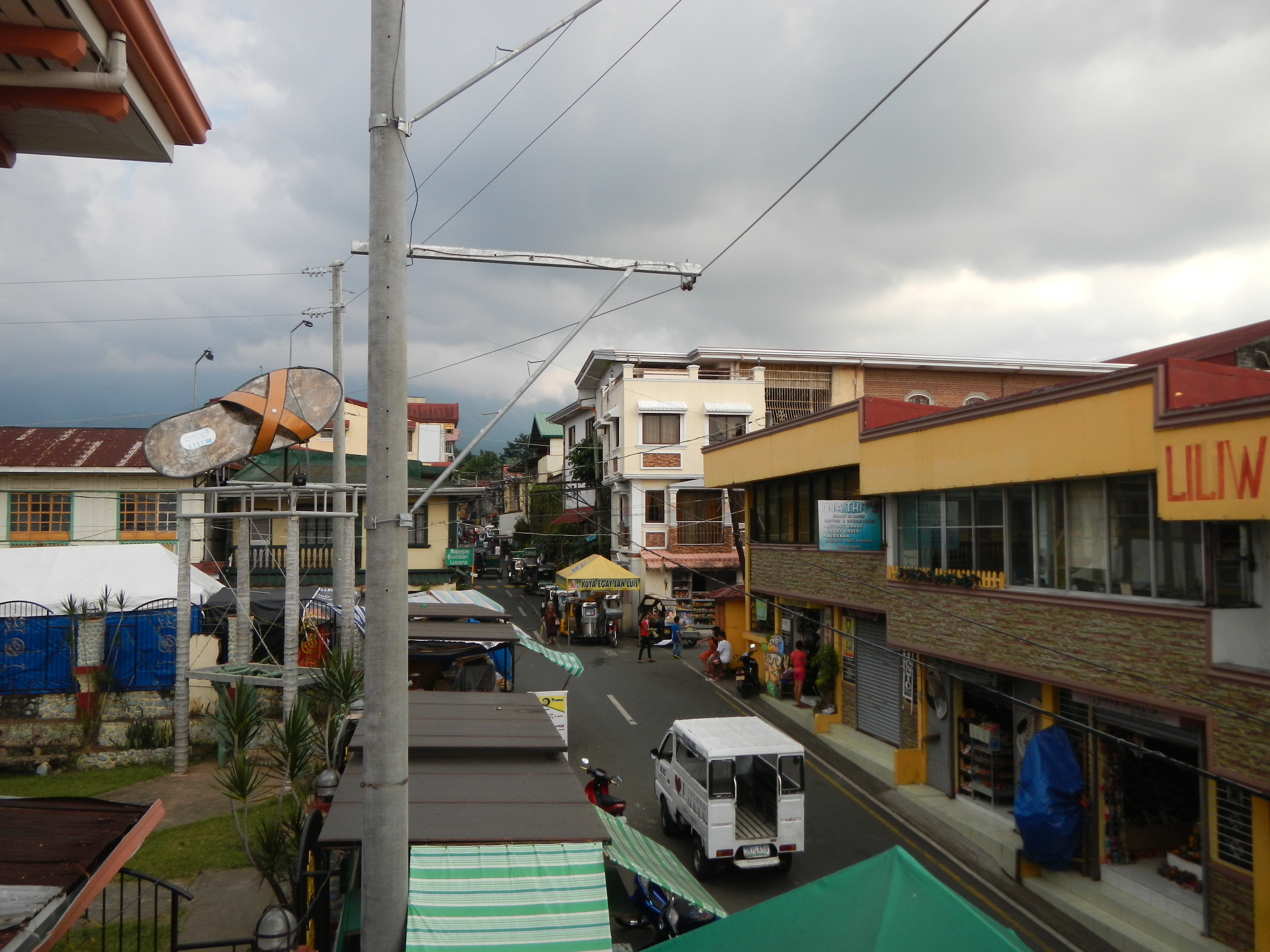
Poblacion

Municipal Hall

Saint John the Baptist Parish Church

Casa Nobleza
