= Majayjay =

Municipality in Laguna, Philippines

Majayjay Mahayhay Mayhay
- Municipality
- Municipality of Majayjay
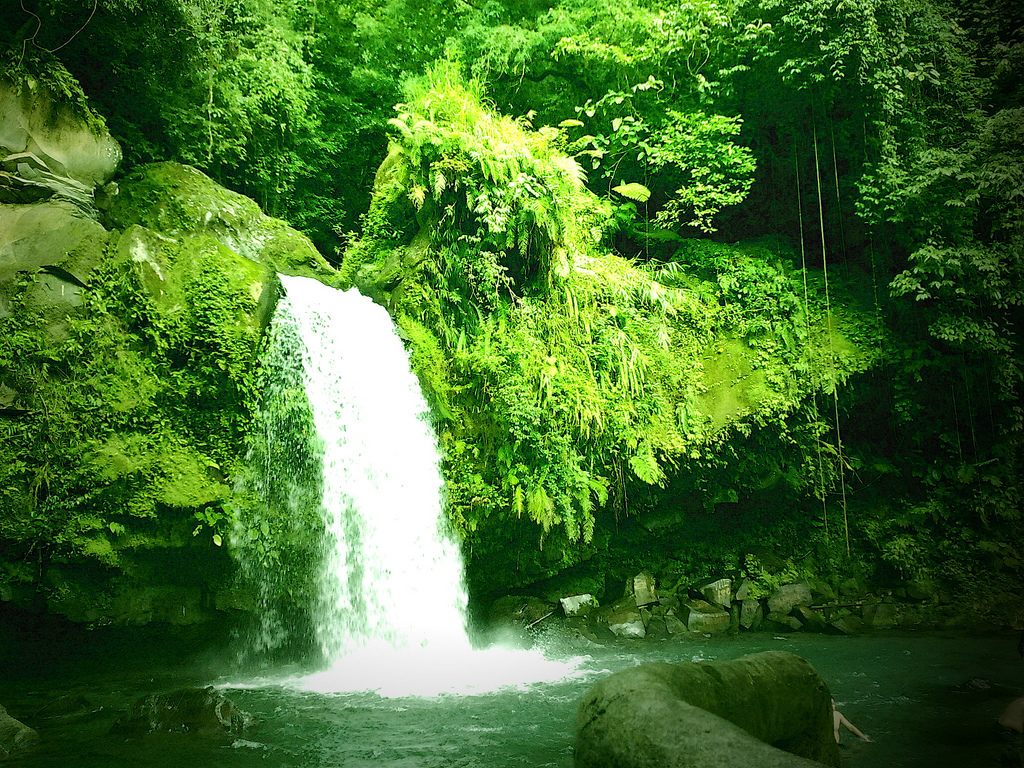
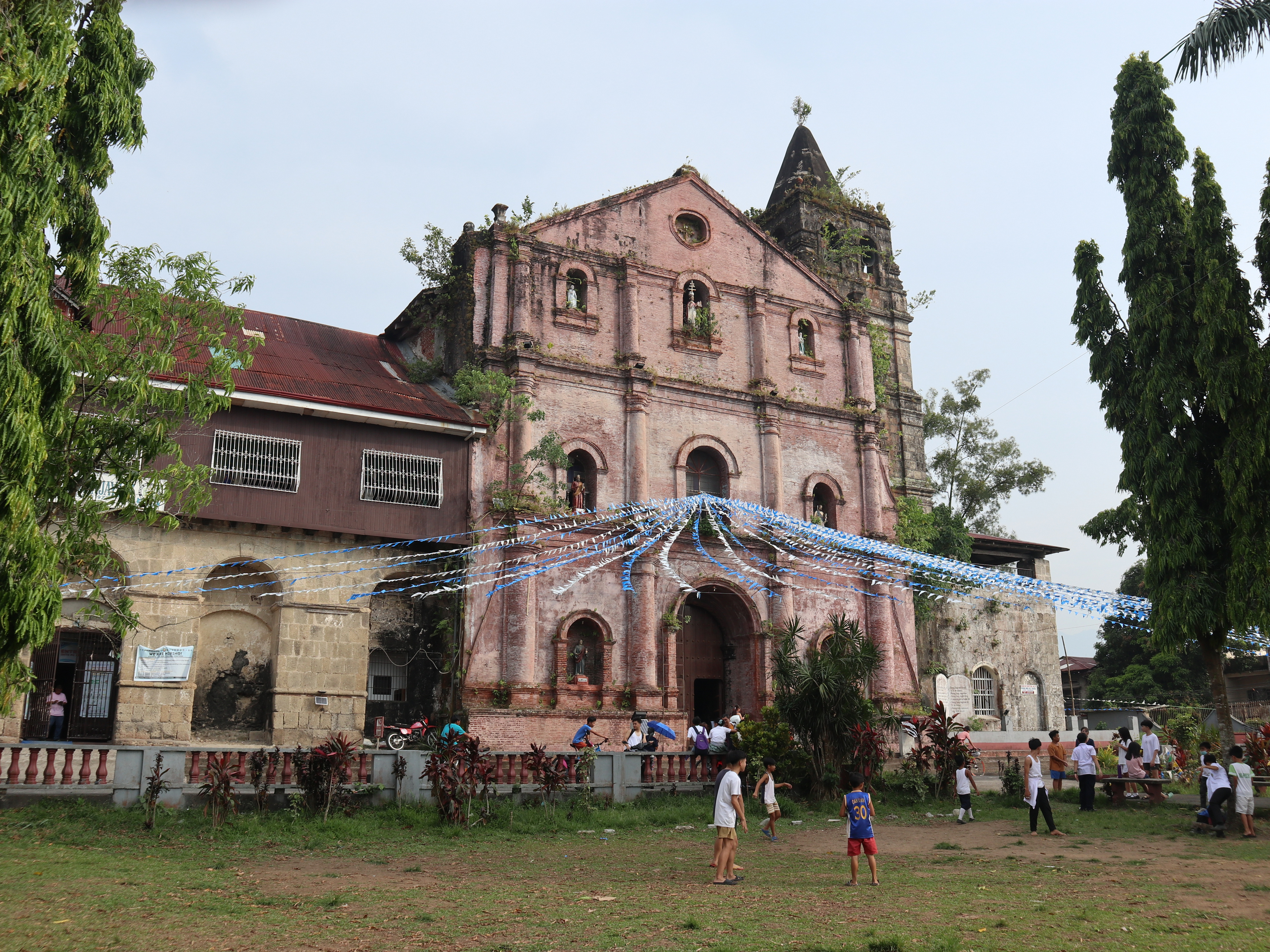
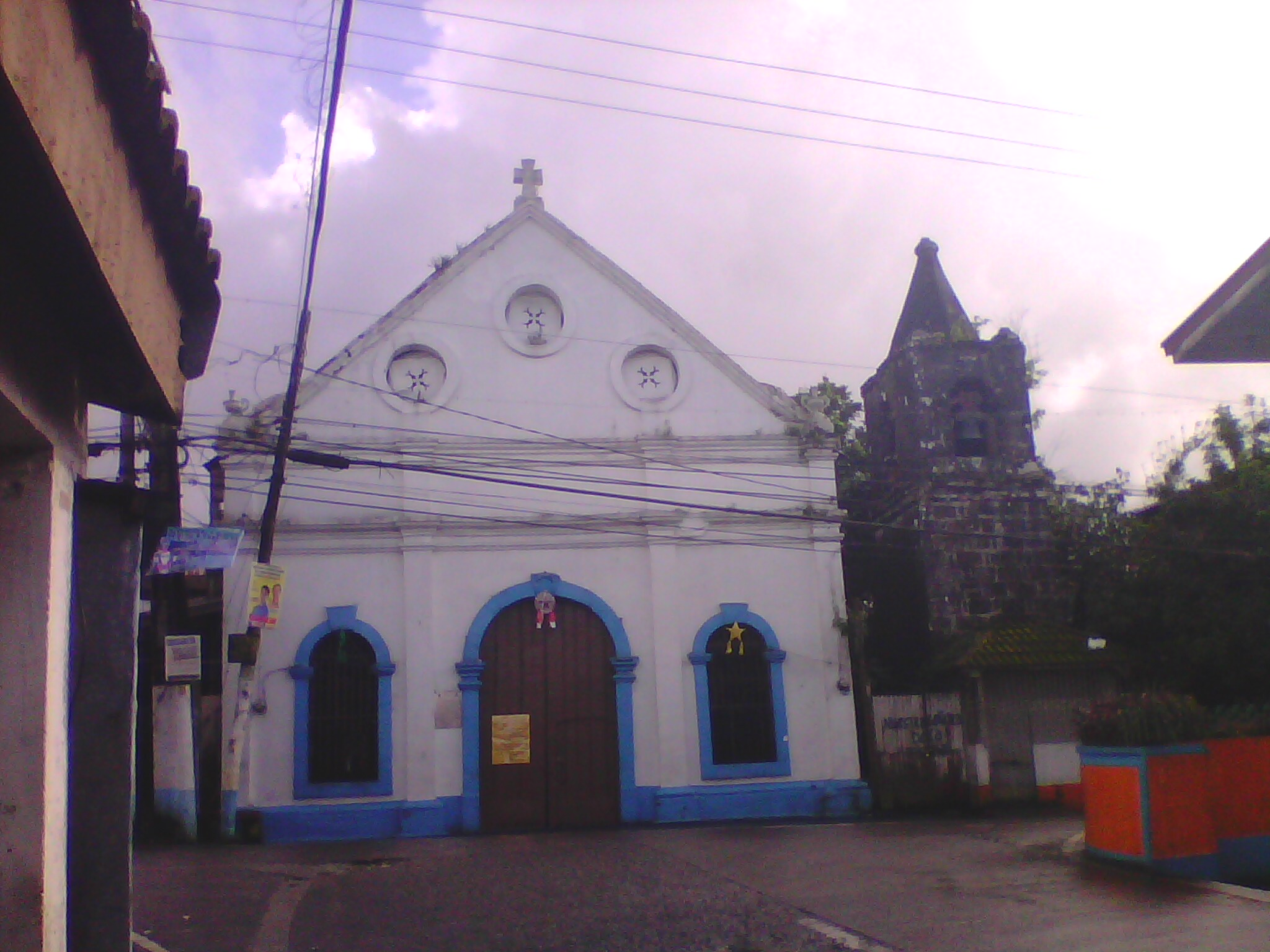
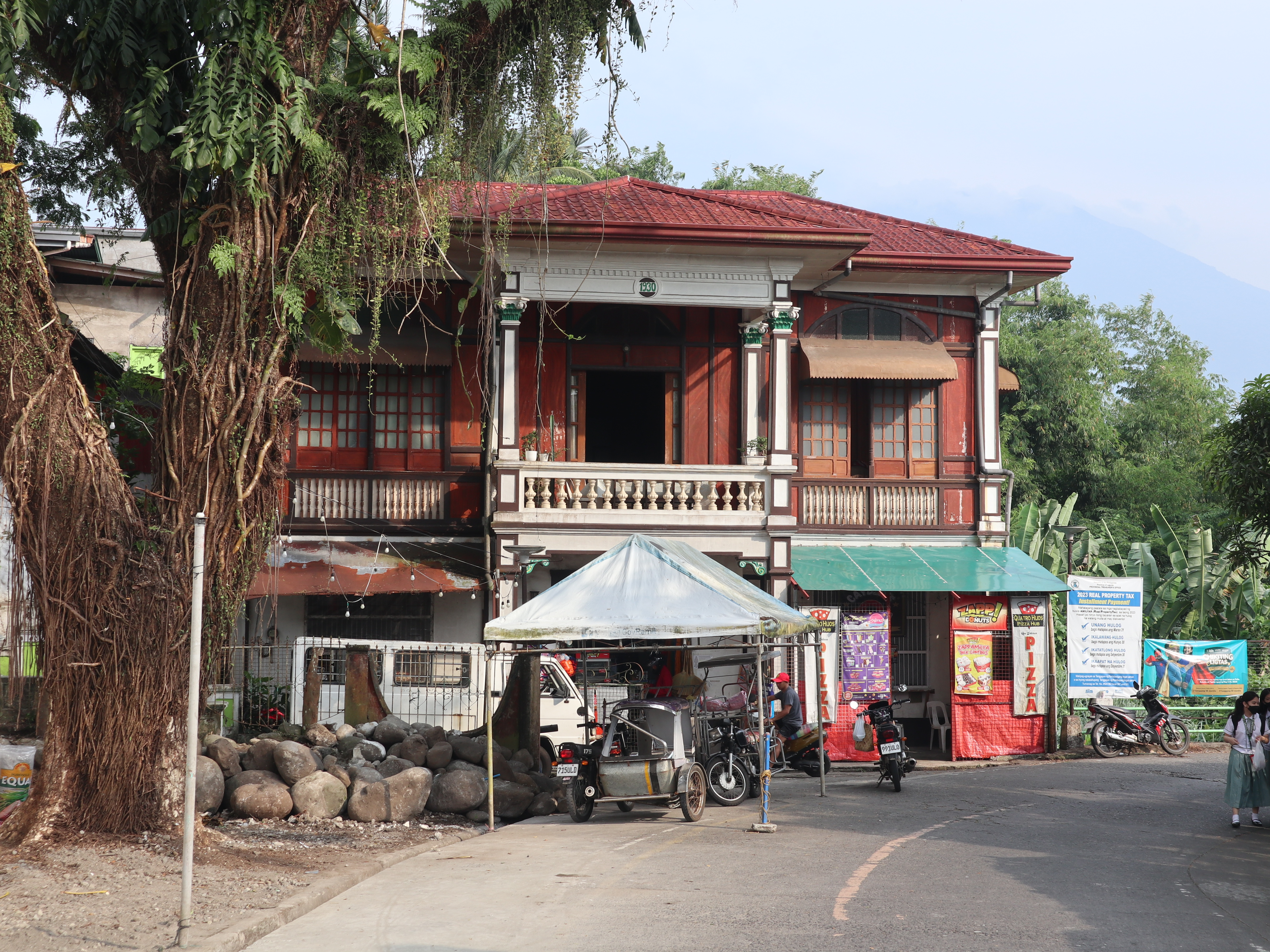
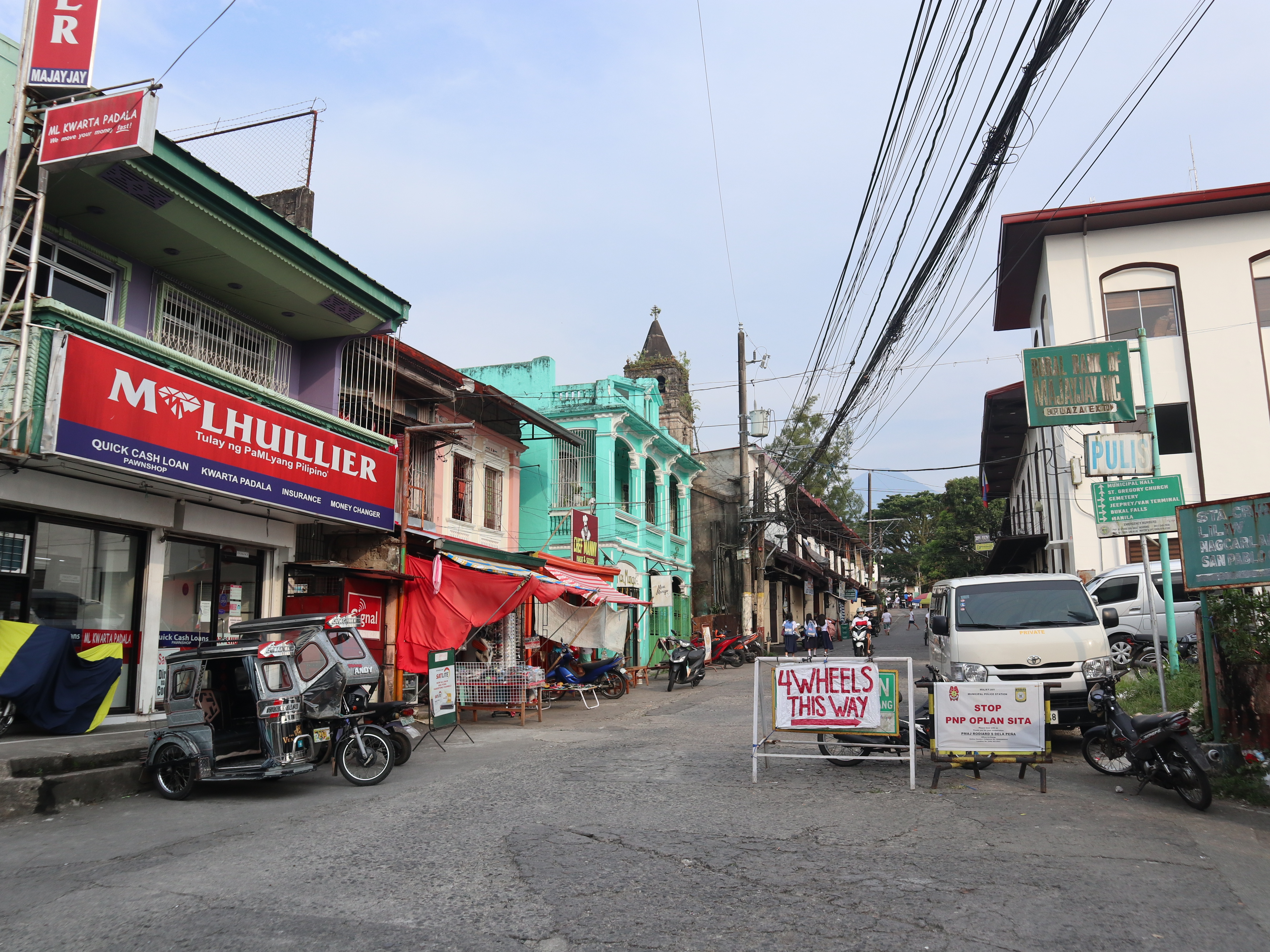
- Clockwise from the top: Taytay Falls, Minor Basilica and Parish of Saint Gregory the Great, Town Proper, Ancestral House, Chapel of Nuestra Señora de la Portería (Ermita)

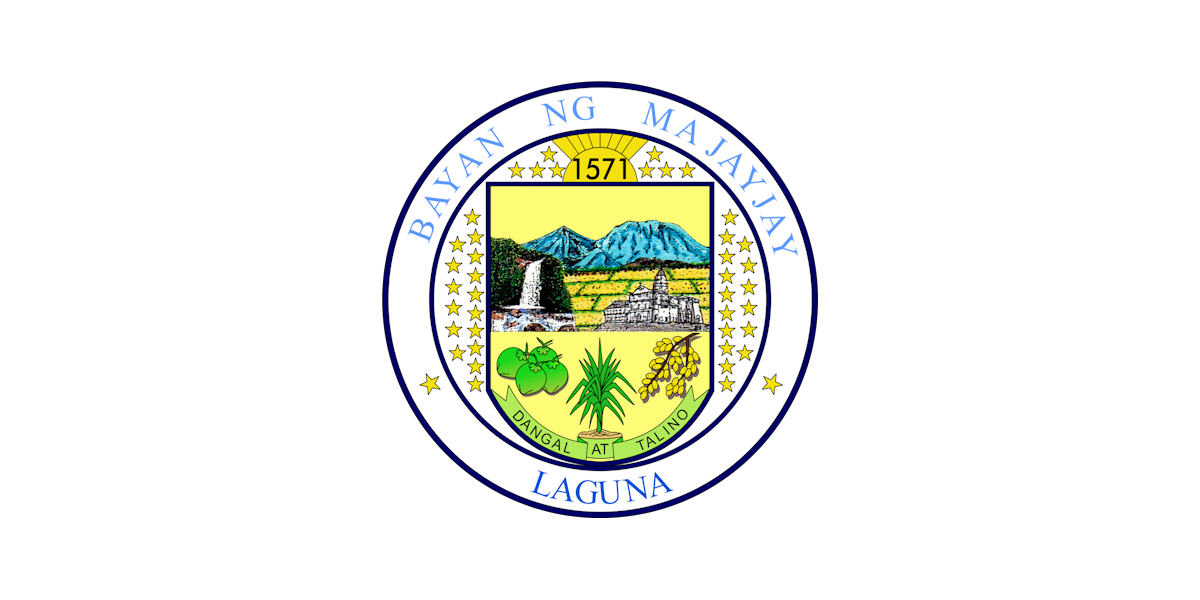
- Flag Seal
- Nicknames: Mahayhay, Mayhay
- Motto: Fly High Majayjay!
- Anthem: Himno ng Majayjay
- Map of Laguna with Majayjay highlighted
- Interactive map of Majayjay
- Location within the Philippines
- Coordinates: 14°08′47″N 121°28′22″E
- Country: Philippines
- Region: Calabarzon
- Province: Laguna
- District: 4th district
- Founded: October 2, 1571
- Barangays: 40 (see Barangays)

Government
  - Type: Sangguniang Bayan
  - Mayor: Romeo P. Amorado
  - Vice Mayor: Juan Ariel A. Argañosa Jr.
  - Representative: Benjamin C. Agarao Jr.
  - Municipal Council: Members: Felix U. Arnuco; Edison S. Reyes; Gabriel A. Mentilla; Ma. Esperanza Z. Bravante; Ma. Fe B. Cabonce; Elfredo A. Bicomong; Dandred O. Eriga; Juancho M. Andaya
  - Electorate: 21,004 voters (2025)

Area
  - Total: 69.58 km^{2} (26.86 sq mi)
- Elevation: 500 m (1,600 ft)
- Highest elevation: 2,173 m (7,129 ft)
- Lowest elevation: 27 m (89 ft)

Population (2024 census)
  - Total: 28,504
  - Density: 409.7/km^{2} (1,061/sq mi)
  - Households: 7,026

Economy
  - Income class: 3rd municipal income class
  - Poverty incidence: 15.53% (2023)
  - Revenue: ₱ 157.3 million (2024)
  - Assets: ₱ 330.5 million (2024)
  - Expenditure: ₱ 63.68 million (2024)
  - Liabilities: ₱ 63.66 million (2024)

Service provider
  - Electricity: Manila Electric Company (Meralco)
- Time zone: UTC+8 (PST)
- ZIP code: 4005, 4006 (Botocan)
- PSGC: 0403416000
- IDD : area code: +63 (0)49
- Native languages: Tagalog

Majayjay (Tagalog: [mɐhaɪ̯ˈhaɪ̯]), officially the Municipality of Majayjay (Tagalog: Bayan ng Majayjay), is a municipality in southeastern Laguna bordering the town of Lucban, Quezon. According to the 2024 census, it has a population of 28,504 people.

== History ==
=== Luzonian town ===
Since time immemorial, Majayjay had been a Luzonian town of Tagalog citizens. It was founded at the foot of the mountain, which gave it an abundant supply of fresh spring water. Four rivers flowed through the town: Initian, Oobi, Olla, and Balanac (from the falls of Botocan) where all the rivers meet. Botocan Falls and the town's scenery were uniquely famous, attracting wealthy citizens from other towns to become guests at Majayjay. By 1571, Majayjay was one of the most populated towns around Laguna de Bay and near the capital of the Kingdom of Luzon in Manila.

The road to Majayjay was considered to be tough. Guests often had to be ferried from Manila through the Pasig River to Laguna de Bay. Land travel was through the intermunicipal highway and then by being transported in either palanquins or hammocks on the way up to the town.

In 1571, Spanish warriors with Cebuano Visayan reinforcements moved towards the town from Liliw after having sacked Nagcarlan. Upon reaching the river Olla while going through the intermunicipal highway, they stopped and retraced their steps back upon the sight of Majayjay town guards. They went through the main road at Panglan instead. They attacked in the dark before dawn with guns and drums. The citizens fled from the attack as though fleeing pillage, leaving no one but a man named Liraw and a pregnant woman nearing labor whom the Spaniards captured. The town was then held by warriors of the Kingdom of the Spains and the Indies.

=== Spanish rule ===
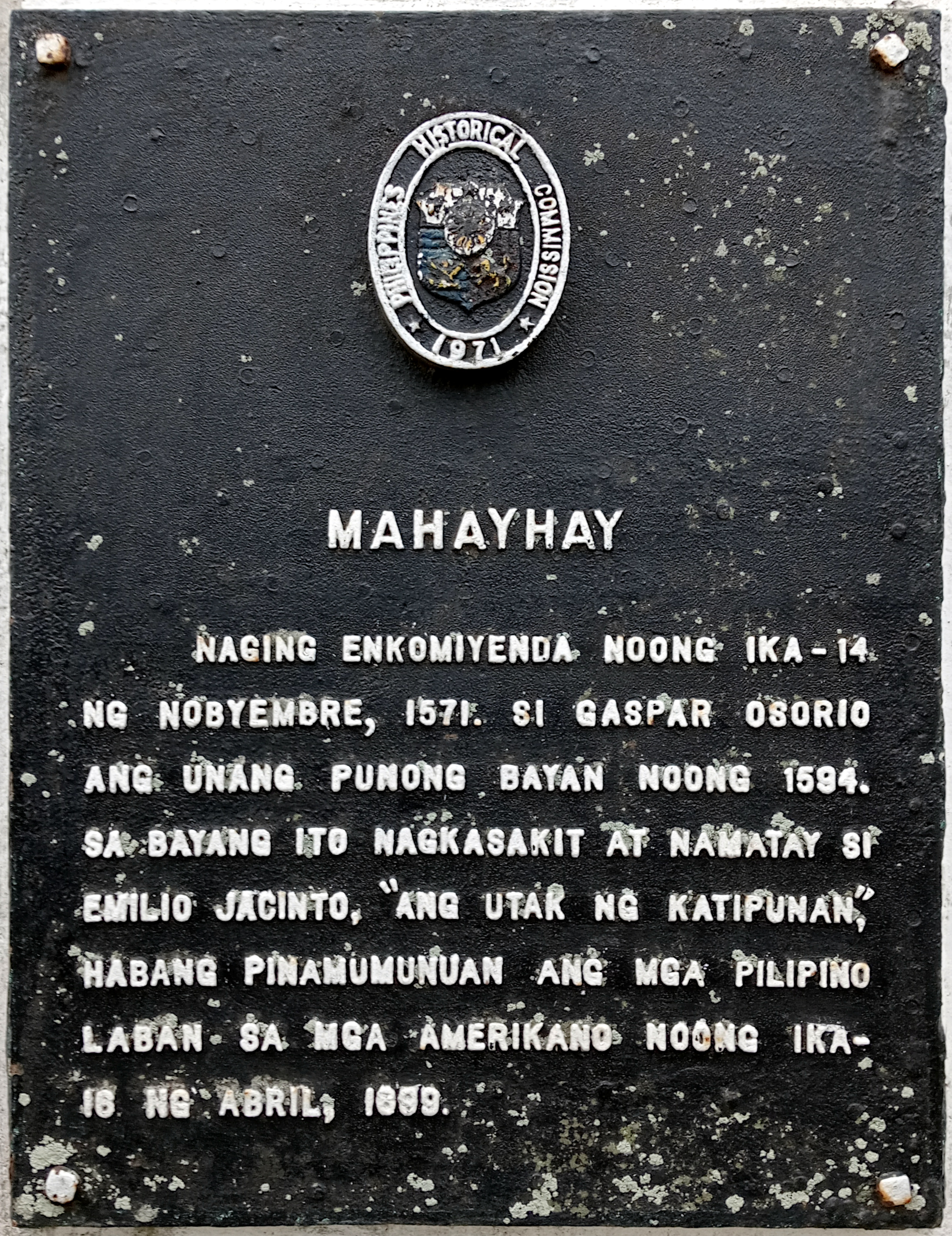
National historical marker installed in 1971

The town's popularity grew during Spanish rule. Botocan Falls went on to lead European travellers, besides wealthy Filipinos, to frequently visit the town. Land travel also started to be aided by horses.

After the conversion of the citizens of Majayjay, the Spanish priests ordered the construction of a provisional church near the May-it River, but it was destroyed by a fire in 1578. A new church made of bamboo and cogon thatch was built; however, another fire destroyed it again. A stone church was then built, which was also burned down. Despite the fires, the image of their patron saint, San Gregorio Papa Magno, survived.

Through the efforts of the Spanish priest Padre José de Puertollano, contributions enforced by parishioners, and forced labor of Filipinos, a new church was built in 1730, with construction taking 19 years.

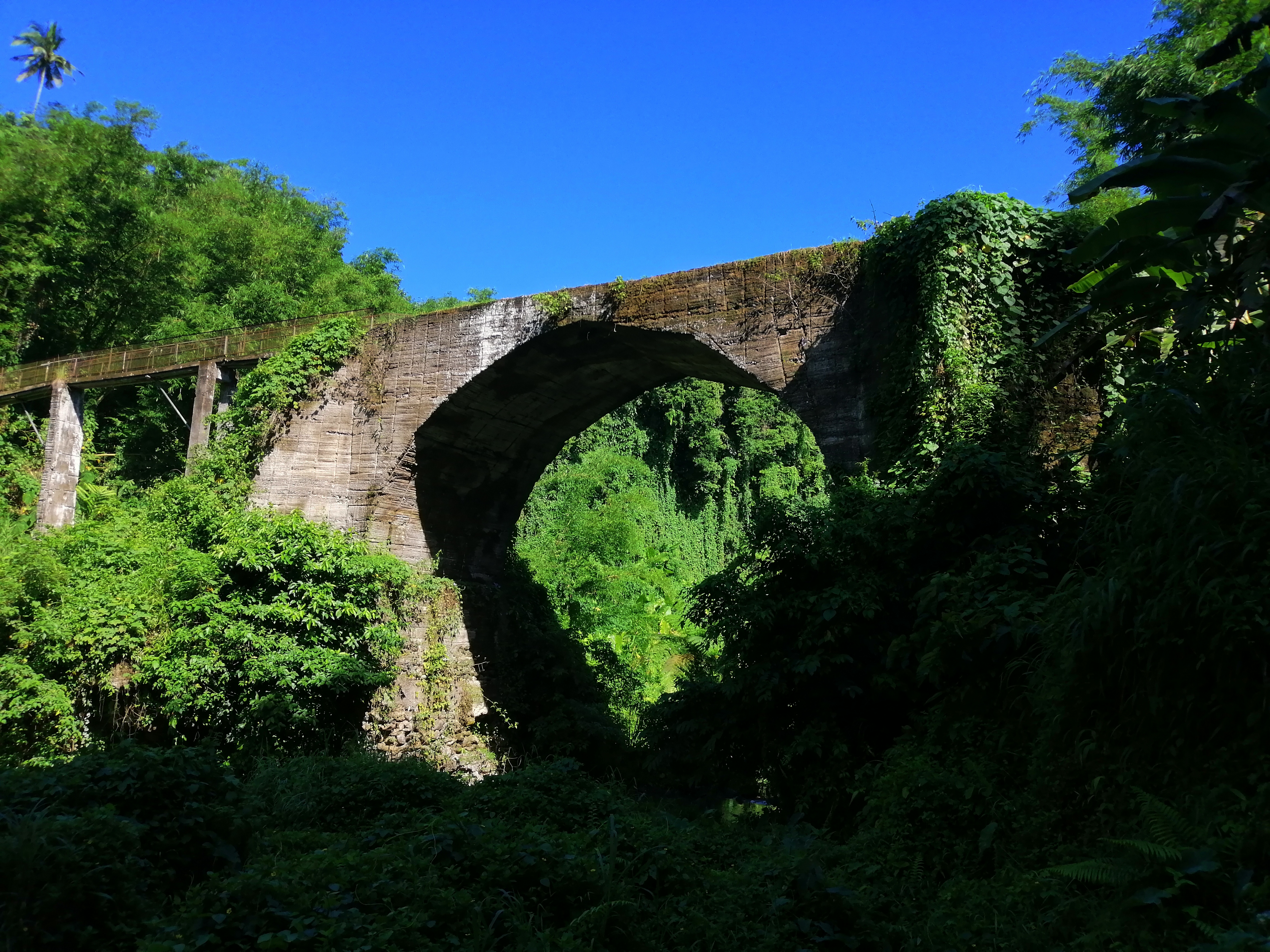
The old Puente de Capricho, an unfinished bridge built in the 1850s

== Geography ==
Majayjay is situated in southeastern Laguna. It nestles at the foot of Mt. Banahaw, and due to its higher altitude, the town is a popular summer vacation destination in the Philippines. It was once branded as the "Summer Capital of the Philippines" 300–400 years ago during the Spanish era, when most of the prominent names in the Spanish colonial Philippines visited the area. Other sights along the streets include remnants of Spanish-inspired houses that still stand at periodic key locations, mostly in the town square. Affluent families still maintain their ancestral houses.

Majayjay is situated at the base of Mount Banahaw, approximately 300 meters (980 ft) above sea level. It is 62 kilometers (39 mi) from Santa Cruz, 107 kilometers (66 mi) from Manila and 12 kilometers (7.5 mi) from Lucban, Quezon, which it borders to the southeast. Other bordering towns include Magdalena to the northwest, Luisiana to the northeast and Liliw to the west.

=== Climate ===
Majayjay is classified as Am (tropical monsoon climate) in the Köppen–Geiger climate classification. There is significant rainfall in most months of the year, with annual rainfall averaging 2,571 mm, and the precipitation difference between the driest and wettest months is 332 mm. The short dry season has little effect on the overall climate. The temperature here averages 25.8 °C, and average temperatures vary by 3.2 °C over the course of the year. The warmest month of the year is May, with an average temperature of 27.4 °C. January has the lowest average temperature of the year, which is 24.2 °C.

Climate data for Majayjay, Laguna
Month	Jan	Feb	Mar	Apr	May	Jun	Jul	Aug	Sep	Oct	Nov	Dec	Year
Mean daily maximum °C (°F)	25 (77)	26 (79)	28 (82)	30 (86)	30 (86)	29 (84)	28 (82)	27 (81)	27 (81)	27 (81)	26 (79)	25 (77)	27 (81)
Mean daily minimum °C (°F)	19 (66)	19 (66)	19 (66)	20 (68)	22 (72)	23 (73)	22 (72)	22 (72)	22 (72)	21 (70)	21 (70)	20 (68)	21 (70)
Average precipitation mm (inches)	52 (2.0)	35 (1.4)	27 (1.1)	27 (1.1)	82 (3.2)	124 (4.9)	163 (6.4)	144 (5.7)	145 (5.7)	141 (5.6)	100 (3.9)	102 (4.0)	1,142 (45)
Average rainy days	12.0	8.1	8.8	9.7	17.9	22.6	26.2	24.5	24.6	22.0	16.7	14.9	208
Source: Meteoblue

=== Barangays ===
Majayjay is politically subdivided into 40 barangays, the smallest administrative division in the Philippines, as listed in the table below. Each barangay consists of puroks, or unofficial divisions within a barangay, and some barangays also have sitios, which are also unofficial divisions within a barangay.

Barangay Name	Barangay Chairman	Philippine Standard Geographic Codes Code	Urban/Rural	Population (2020 Census)
Amonoy	Marcelina M. Condino	043416001	Rural	150
Bakia	Digna A. Arce	043416002	Rural	512
Balanac	Digna R. Breganza	043416004	Rural	51
Balayong	Jeffrey John F. Esquillo	043416005	Rural	73
Banilad	Ricarte O. Solison	043416007	Rural	204
Banti	Carlito M. Breganza	043416008	Rural	82
Bitaoy	Efren G. Bojeador	043416010	Rural	196
Botocan	Manolo L. Arasa	043416011	Rural	931
Bukal	Magno Juaren P. Brosas	043416003	Rural	745
Burgos	Genaro A. Villaraza	043416012	Rural	147
Burol	Ariel M. Argañosa	043416013	Rural	43
Coralao	Mauro V. Bravante	043416014	Rural	495
Gagalot	Concepcion V. Borines	043416015	Rural	923
Ibabang Banga	Rosana C. Marquez	043416016	Rural	835
Ibabang Bayucain	Orlando S. Patron	043416017	Rural	172
Ilayang Banga	Nestor E. Villarmil	043416018	Rural	1,187
Ilayang Bayucain	Alan G. Expression	043416019	Rural	84
Isabang	Mylyn R. Comendador	043416020	Rural	150
Malinao	Beny P. Trovela	043416021	Rural	752
May-It	Crispin F. Rivera	043416022	Rural	159
Munting Kawayan	Librada D. Arapan	043416023	Rural	744
Olla	Renelito Dave M. Villar	043416025	Rural	1,009
Oobi	Margarito P. Gripo	043416024	Rural	730
Origuel (Poblacion)	Quennie Grace N. Macam	043416026	Urban	1,446
Panalaban	Francisca G. Mirano	043416027	Rural	67
Pangil	Jeffrey E. Zornosa	043416029	Rural	817
Panglan	Eugenio A. Arcellana	043416028	Rural	441
Piit	Marianito T. Rondilla	043416030	Rural	700
Pook	Joan A. Ordonez	043416031	Rural	121
Rizal	Juan V. Borines	043416032	Rural	301
San Francisco (Poblacion)	Juliana E. Oates	043416033	Urban	2,899
San Isidro	Joel S. Bomuel	043416034	Rural	613
San Miguel (Poblacion)	Jennifer B. Cantado	043416035	Urban	4,132
San Roque	Ritche B. Garcia	043416036	Rural	110
Santa Catalina (Poblacion)	Rodrigo A. Gonzaga Jr.	043416037	Urban	2,042
Suba	Aser R. Gonzaga	043416038	Rural	2,099
Talortor	Felicisimo V. Salazar	043416041	Rural	1,105
Tanawan	Celso R. Rubiales	043416039	Rural	85
Taytay	Gregorio A. Mirano	043416040	Rural	415
Villa Nogales	Mario Arnildo M. Sobreviñas	043416042	Rural	126

== Demographics ==
Population census of Majayjay
Year	Pop.	±% p.a.
1903	5,800	—
1918	6,410	+0.67%
1939	7,543	+0.78%
1948	7,753	+0.31%
1960	9,906	+2.06%
1970	12,316	+2.20%
1975	13,182	+1.37%
1980	13,699	+0.77%
1990	15,875	+1.49%
1995	18,989	+3.41%
2000	22,159	+3.36%
2007	23,681	+0.92%
2010	26,547	+4.25%
2015	27,792	+0.88%
2020	27,893	+0.08%
2024	28,504	+0.52%
Source: Philippine Statistics Authority

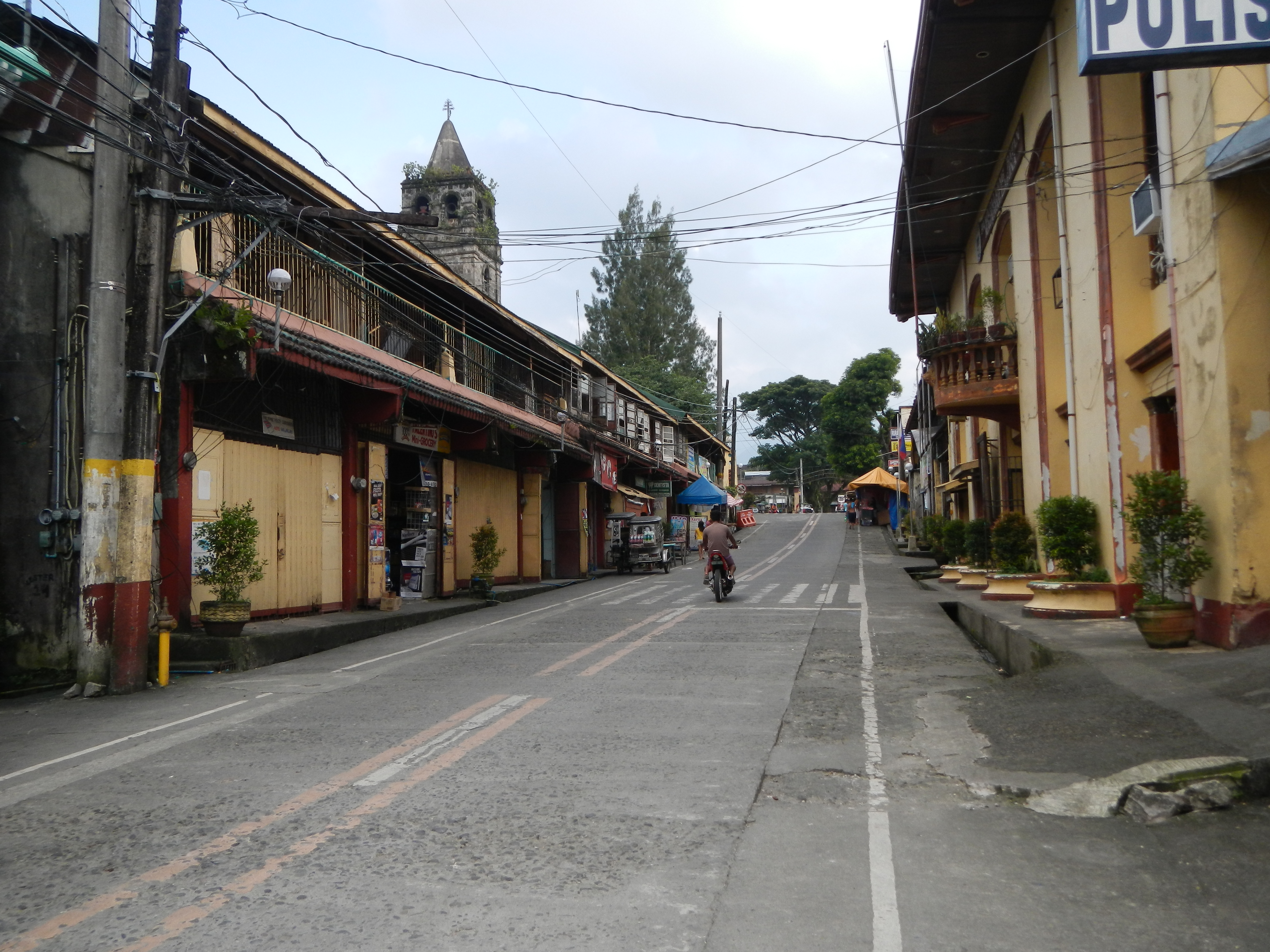
Poblacion with town hall on right, public market on left, and St. Gregory church in the background

In the 2024 census, the population of Majayjay was 28,504 people, with a density of 410 inhabitants per square kilometer or 1,100 inhabitants per square mile.

== Economy ==
Poverty incidence of Majayjay (%)

Source: Philippine Statistics Authority

The town boasts a line of shanties of budding small enterprises, mostly selling indigenous farm crops, along its main road.

== Tourism ==
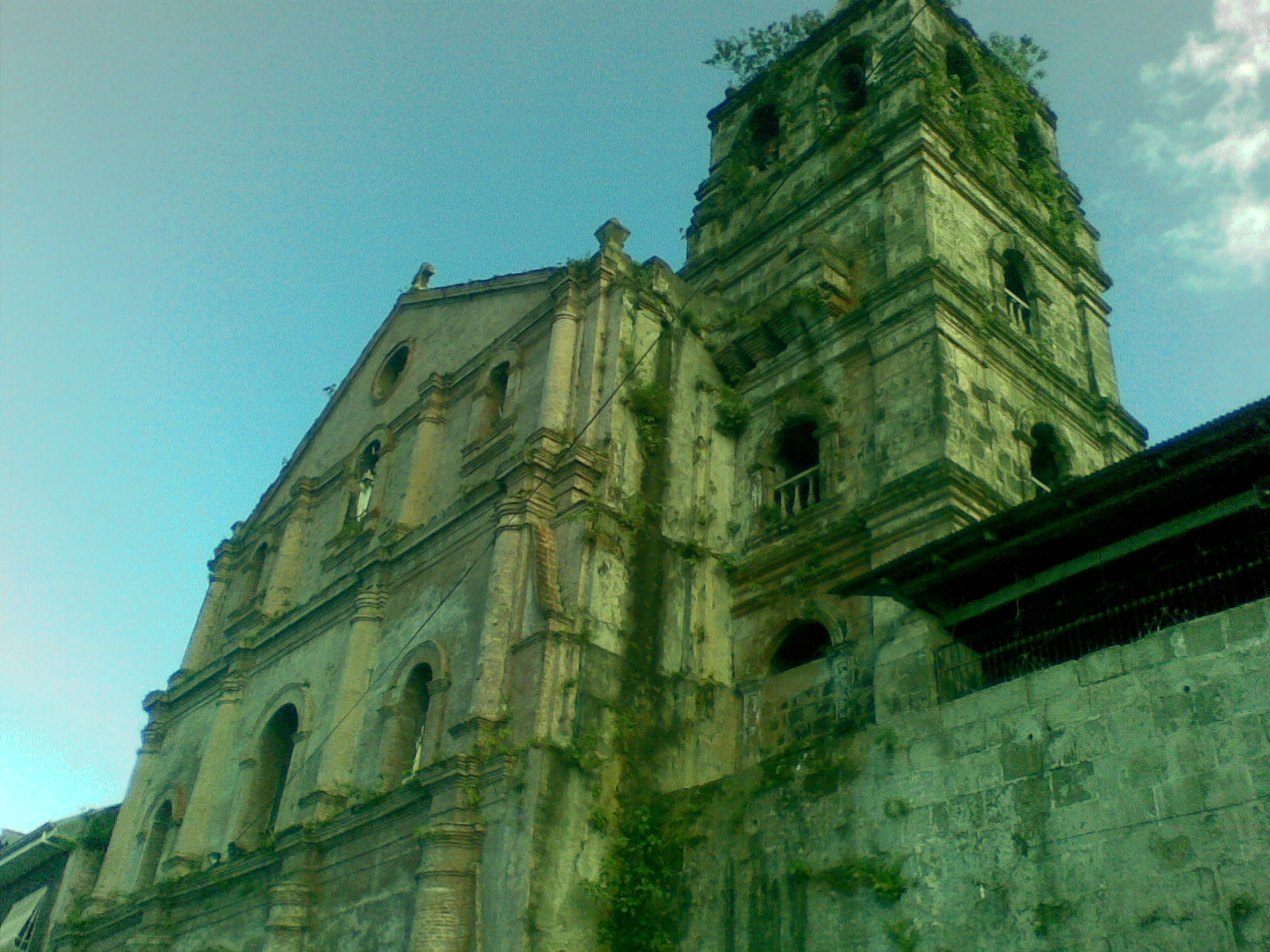
St. Gregory the Great Parish Church

- Minor Basilica and Parish of Saint Gregory the Great: Majayjay is home to one of the oldest Roman Catholic churches in the Philippines, the Minor Basilica and Parish of Saint Gregory the Great. It was built in 1575 through forced labor by the town folks. Inside the church are antique statues of saints brought by the Spaniards during the early era of propagating Christianity. The church underwent fire incidents in 1576, 1606, and 1660, but was subsequently reconstructed and rehabilitated. A view of Laguna de Bay can be seen from the church roof. On January 25, 2025, Pope Francis designated it as a minor basilica, after a petition letter from the Bishop of San Pablo, Marcelino Antonio Maralit, on December 6, 2024; it is the first in the said diocese to be designated as such.

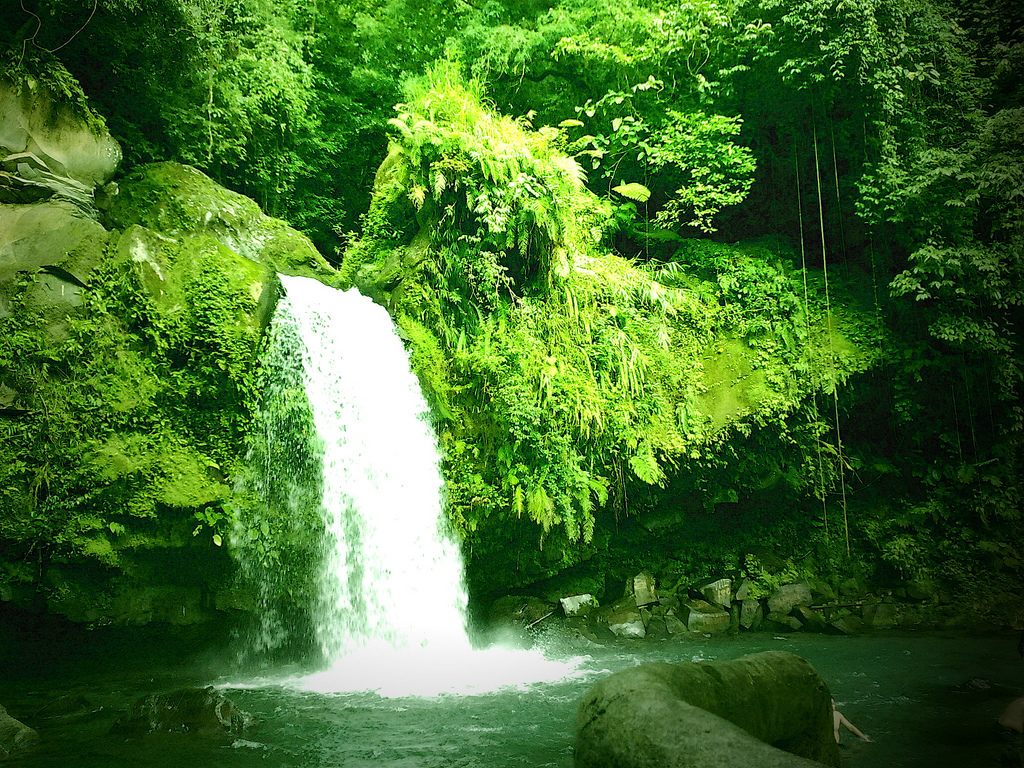
Taytay Falls

- Taytay Falls: Also known as Majayjay Falls or even Imelda Falls because ex-First Lady Imelda Marcos financed the promotion of tourism in this place. It is a two-story high fall located in a forested area.
- Puente de Capriccio: In José Rizal's El Filibusterismo, he mentioned an old Spanish stone bridge built in 1851. It was a one-arch bridge since it was not finished. Early natives built a bamboo footbridge to connect the opposite sides to make it accessible. Puente de Capriccio was initiated by Spanish Franciscan priest Victoriano del Moral. The priest was cruel and autocratic; anyone who did not labor in the construction would be later punished by whipping the buttocks. The workers were reportedly not paid a single centavo. Because of his cruelty, the workers campaigned against him; thus, the bridge's construction never resumed after 1851. The bridge still stands firm today, crossing the Olla River. It is called Tulay ng Pige (Bridge of Buttocks) by residents. The bridge now symbolizes the defiance of Filipino workers against the oppressive Spanish colonialists during the colonial period.
- Mount Banahaw: Majayjay is located at the foot of this mountain. In the early Spanish era, Mount Banahaw was called Monte de Majayjay, because it was the only way to travel to the mountain. Many European elites visited the town for Mount Banahaw.
- Bukal Falls: Popular among most tourists as the Enchanted Falls.
- Botocan Hydroelectric Power Plant and Dam: It is the first hydroelectric power plant constructed in the Philippines in the 20th century (1930). It is now owned by the CBK Power Company Limited.
- Ermita Church: Then, a tribunal. This holy place houses the image of Nuestra Señora de la Portería.
- Our Lady of the Gate Grotto: Situated along the Olla riverbank is a sacred place where masses are held at times. It is a small tourist destination for religious excursionists.

== Culture ==
=== Festivals ===
Majayjay Day is celebrated every year on October 2 as part of the celebration of the town's founding anniversary. It features off-farm and agricultural products produced primarily from the town's 40 barangays. In 2016, this day was revamped as the AniLinang Festival, with the first such festival under this name held on October 2 that year as an initiative of the local government to promote the town's laid-back and peaceful way of life reflected in its agricultural produce and indigenous cuisines.

SaGreMa Festival (from the syllabic abbreviation of San Gregorio Magno Majayjay) is a parochial festivity celebrated on September 3, the day when Saint Gregory, the town's patron saint, became a pope, and March 12, the day he died. In the festival, Majayjayeños honor the saint for the fortunes of their town.

== Transportation ==
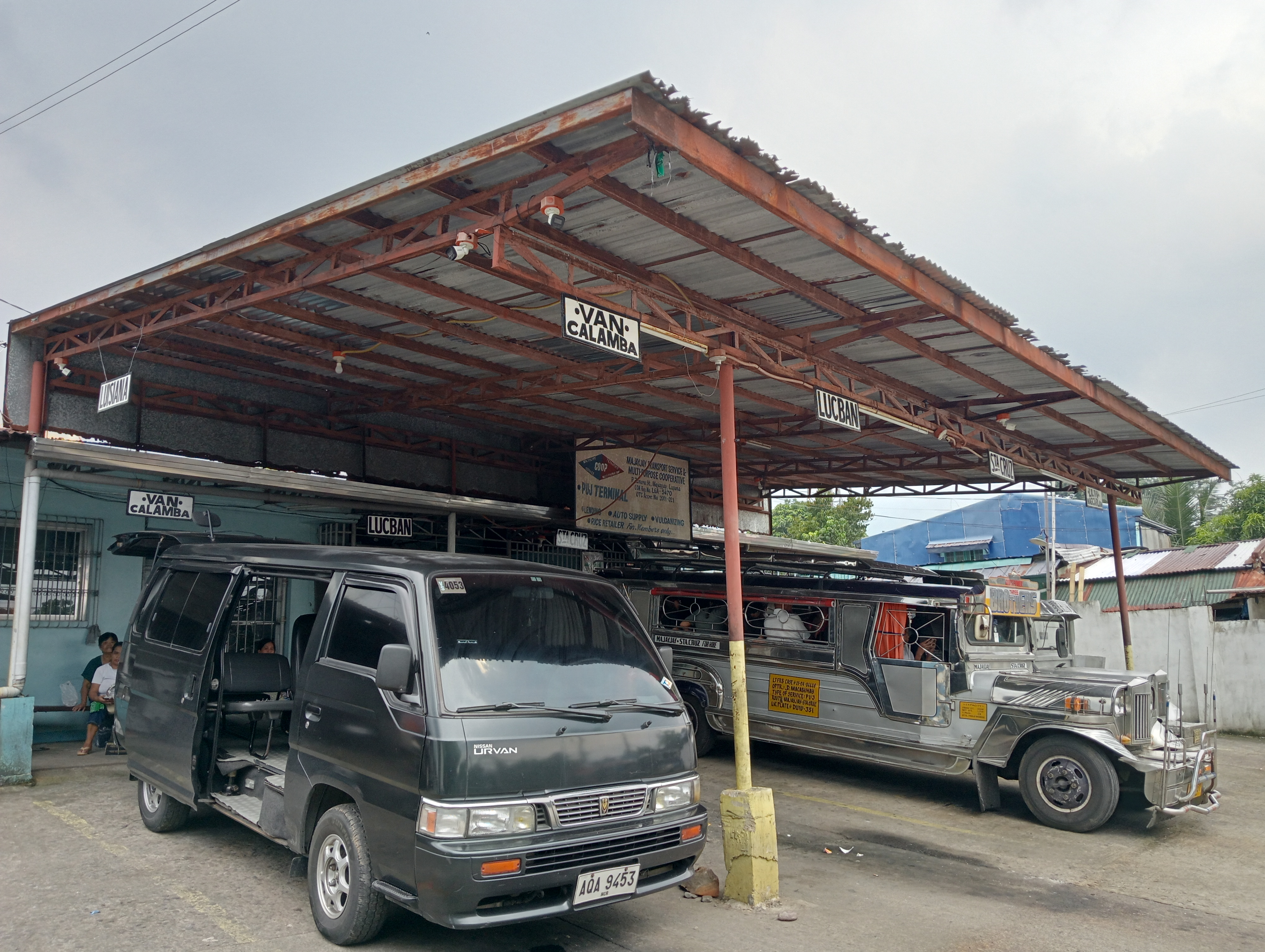
Majayjay Transport Terminal

The town can be accessed by four entry points: Magdalena-Majayjay Road to the north, Liliw-Majayjay Road to the west, Luisiana-Majayjay Road to the east, and Lucban-Majayjay Road to the south. Public utility vehicles, such as local jeepneys and tricycles, are modes of public transportation in the municipality.

- UV Express

=== Jeepney Routes ===
- San Pablo
- Liliw
- Rizal
- Nagcarlan
- Magdalena
- Luisiana
- Santa Cruz (via Nagcarlan, Laguna)
- Lucban

== Infrastructure ==
=== Communication ===
The town of Majayjay has different communication lines, including PLDT, and cellular communications such as Globe, Smart, and DITO.

== Education ==
The Majayjay Schools District Office, led by PSDS Dr. Ginalyn B. Freo, governs all educational institutions within the municipality. It oversees the management and operations of all private and public, from primary to secondary schools.

Primary and elementary school statistics (As of 2025)
School Name	School Head / Teacher-in-Charge	No. Of School Personnel
Bakia-Botocan Elementary School	Rizza-Lyn S. Rada	10
Bukal Elementary School	Jingle A. Moneda	12
Gagalot-Taytay Elementary School	Marie B. Sotalbo	12
Gagalot-Taytay ES Annex	Ramilo M. Aquino	10
Gold Rich Learning School Inc.	Adelaida B. Polecina	5
Liceo De Majayjay	N/A	N/A
Majayjay Elementary School	Dr. Edelita L. Artillero	55
Sta. Catalina Elementary School	Primo C. Royo	24
Suba Elementary School	Angelita U. Suerte	20
Suba ES - Munting Kawayan Annex	Angelita M. Vinas	10

Secondary Schools
School Name	School Head / Teacher-in-Charge	No. Of School Personnel
Liceo De Majayjay	N/A	N/A
Sta. Catalina Intergrated National High School	Laurita P, Arca, PhD.	79
Sta. Catalina National High School Bakia-Botocan Ext.	Marian Z. Arsolacia	8
Suba National High School	Ellenor T. Lat	20
Suba National High School Gagalot Annex	Alberto B. Emata, PhD	8

== Government ==
Majayjay Municipal Hall

=== Elected officials ===
Majayjay Municipal Officials (2025–2028)
Name	Party	Term of office	
Name	Party	Start	End
Municipal Mayor
Romeo P. Amorado	Lakas–CMD	30 June 2025	30 June 2028
Municipal Vice Mayor
Juan Ariel A. Argañosa Jr.	Lakas–CMD	30 June 2025	30 June 2028
Member of the Municipal Council
Felix U. Arnuco	Lakas–CMD	30 June 2025	30 June 2028
Edison S. Reyes	AKAY	30 June 2025	30 June 2028
Gabriel A. Mentilla	NUP	30 June 2025	30 June 2028
Ma. Esperanza Z. Bravante	Lakas–CMD	30 June 2025	30 June 2028
Ma. Fe B. Cabonce	Lakas–CMD	30 June 2025	30 June 2028
Elfredo A. Bicomong	Lakas–CMD	30 June 2025	30 June 2028
Dandred O. Eriga	Lakas–CMD	30 June 2025	30 June 2028
Jauncho M. Andaya	Lakas–CMD	30 June 2025	30 June 2028
ABC Federation President
Margarito P. Gripo	Nonpartisan (Oobi)	15 December 2023	
SK Federation President
Brian E. Fresco	Nonpartisan (Oobi)	14 November 2023	

== Notable people ==
- Gustavo Tobler (1834-1875), merchant and coffee planter from Switzerland
