= Nagcarlan Church =

Roman Catholic church in Laguna, Philippines

- Saint Bartholomew the Apostle Parish Church
- Parokya ni San Bartolome Apostol (Filipino)
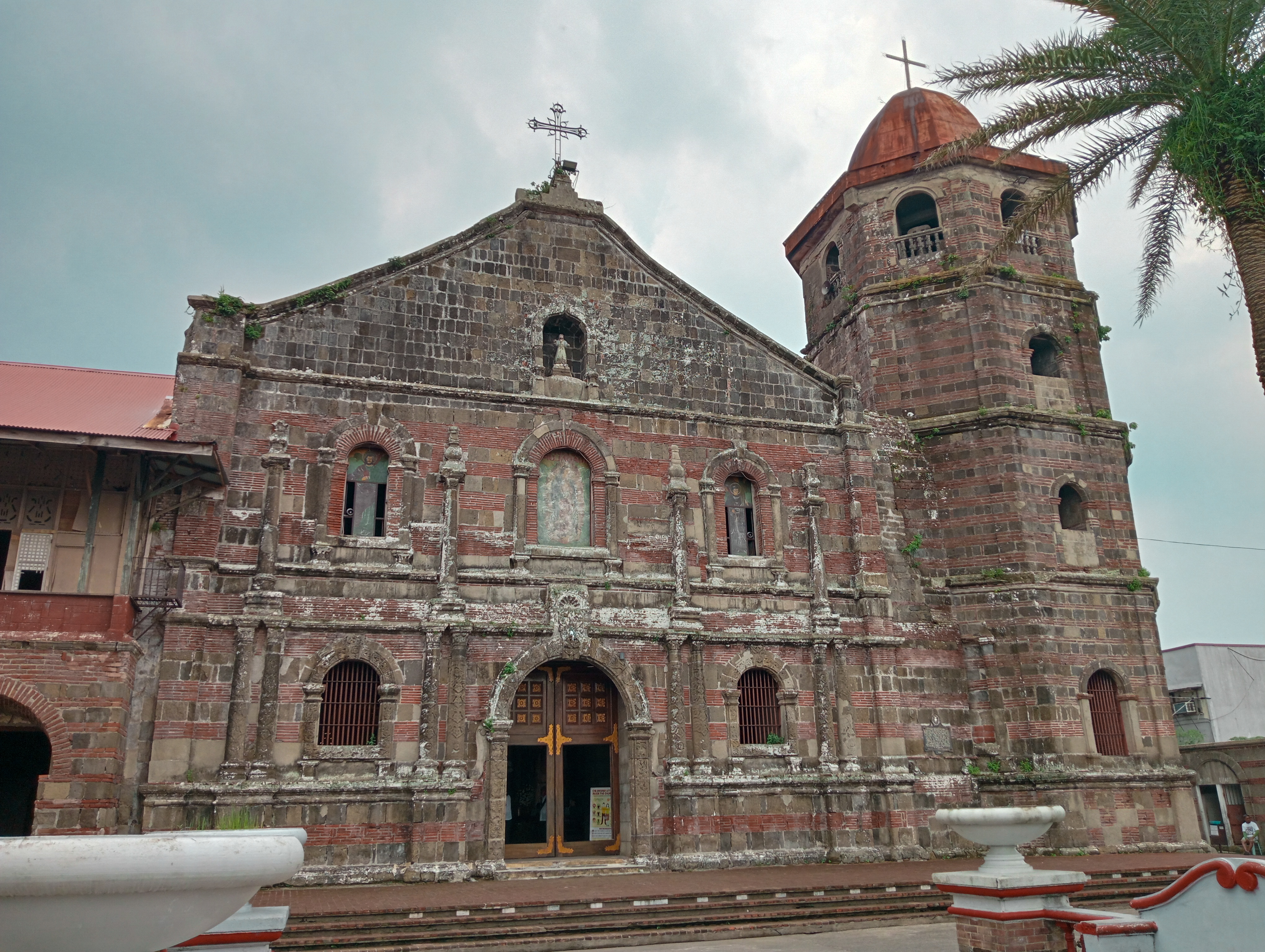
- Church facade in 2024

- Location in Laguna Location in Luzon Location in the Philippines
- 14°08′11″N 121°25′03″E
- Location: Nagcarlan, Laguna
- Country: Philippines
- Denomination: Roman Catholic

History
- Status: Parish church
- Dedication: Saint Bartholomew
- Dedicated: 1583

Architecture
- Functional status: Active
- Architectural type: Church building
- Style: Baroque

Specifications
- Materials: Volcanic tuff, brick and other native material

Administration
- Province: Manila
- Metropolis: Manila
- Archdiocese: Manila
- Diocese: San Pablo
- Deanery: San Bartolome

Clergy
- Priest: Eduardo Arupo

San Bartolome Apostol Parish Church, also known as Saint Bartholomew the Apostle Parish Church, is a Roman Catholic church in Nagcarlan, Laguna, Philippines. Its titular saint is Bartholomew and its feast day is celebrated every August 24. The church is under the jurisdiction of the Diocese of San Pablo.

== History ==
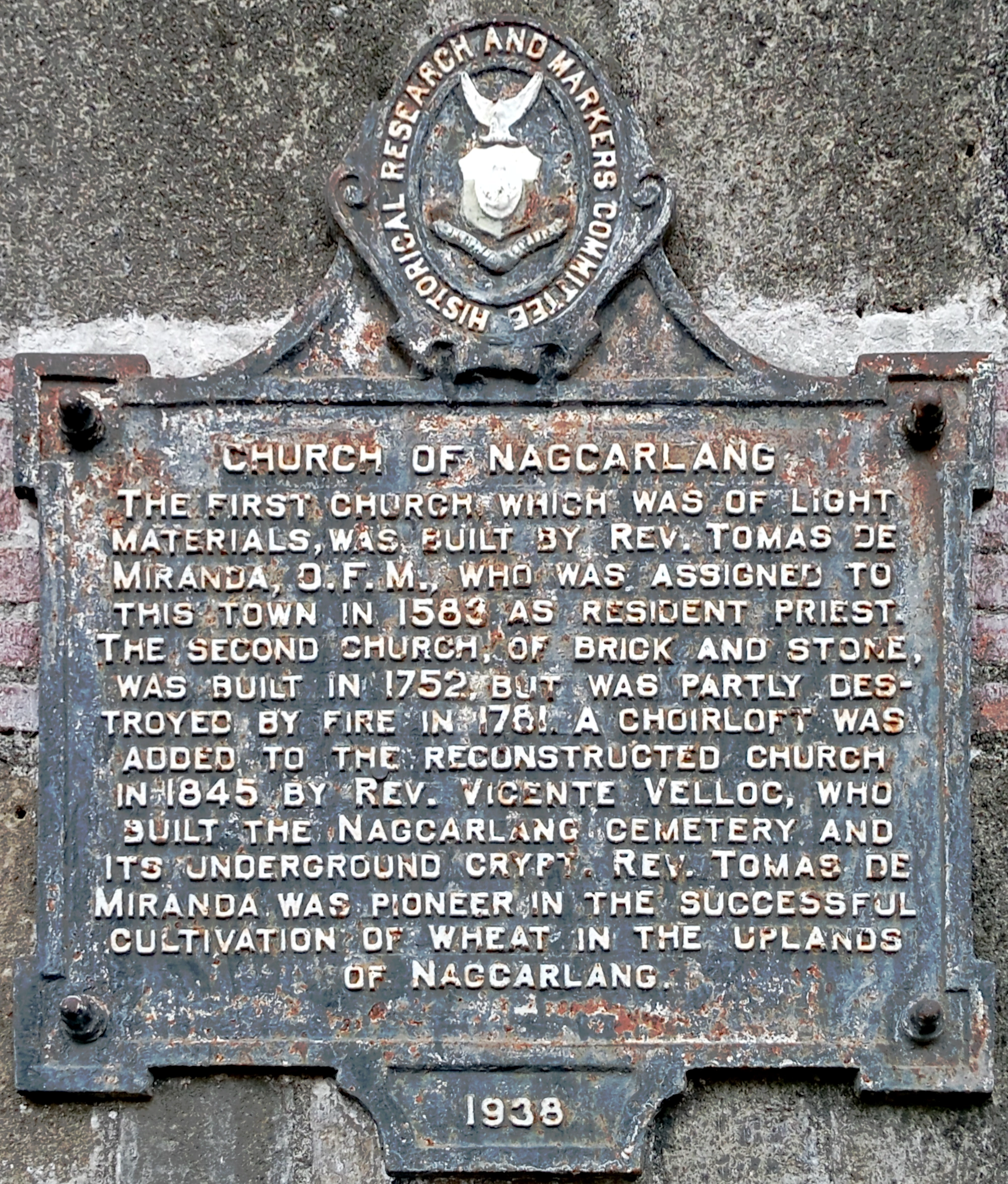
Church HRMC historical marker installed in 1938

Nagcarlan was first colonized in 1571 by Juan de Salcedo, grandson of Miguel López de Legazpi. It was founded by Franciscan priests Juan de Plasencia and Diego Oropesa in 1578. The church of Nagcarlan was first built from light materials such as nipa and wood in 1583 under the chaplaincy of its first priest, Tomas de Miranda who also pioneered the cultivation of wheat in the country. The church was dedicated to Saint Bartholomew. During Cristobal Torres' term, a second church made of stone and bricks was built in 1752. The multicolored stones and bricks of the church were offered by the people during its construction.

The church was partially destroyed by fire in 1781. Immediate repair and reconstruction was done under the term of Anatacio de Argobejo and later by Fernando de la Puebla, who built the four-storey stone and brick bell tower. Further reconstruction using adobe and renovation (including elaborately designed tiles) in 1845 and addition of the choir loft on three strong arches was done under the supervision of Vicente Velloc. The Nagcarlan Underground Cemetery was built also in 1845 and the church rectory in 1850 under Velloc. In the 1990s, Monsignor Jose Barrion led a huge restoration project for the church. In 2016, part of the church's facade collapsed.

== Architecture ==
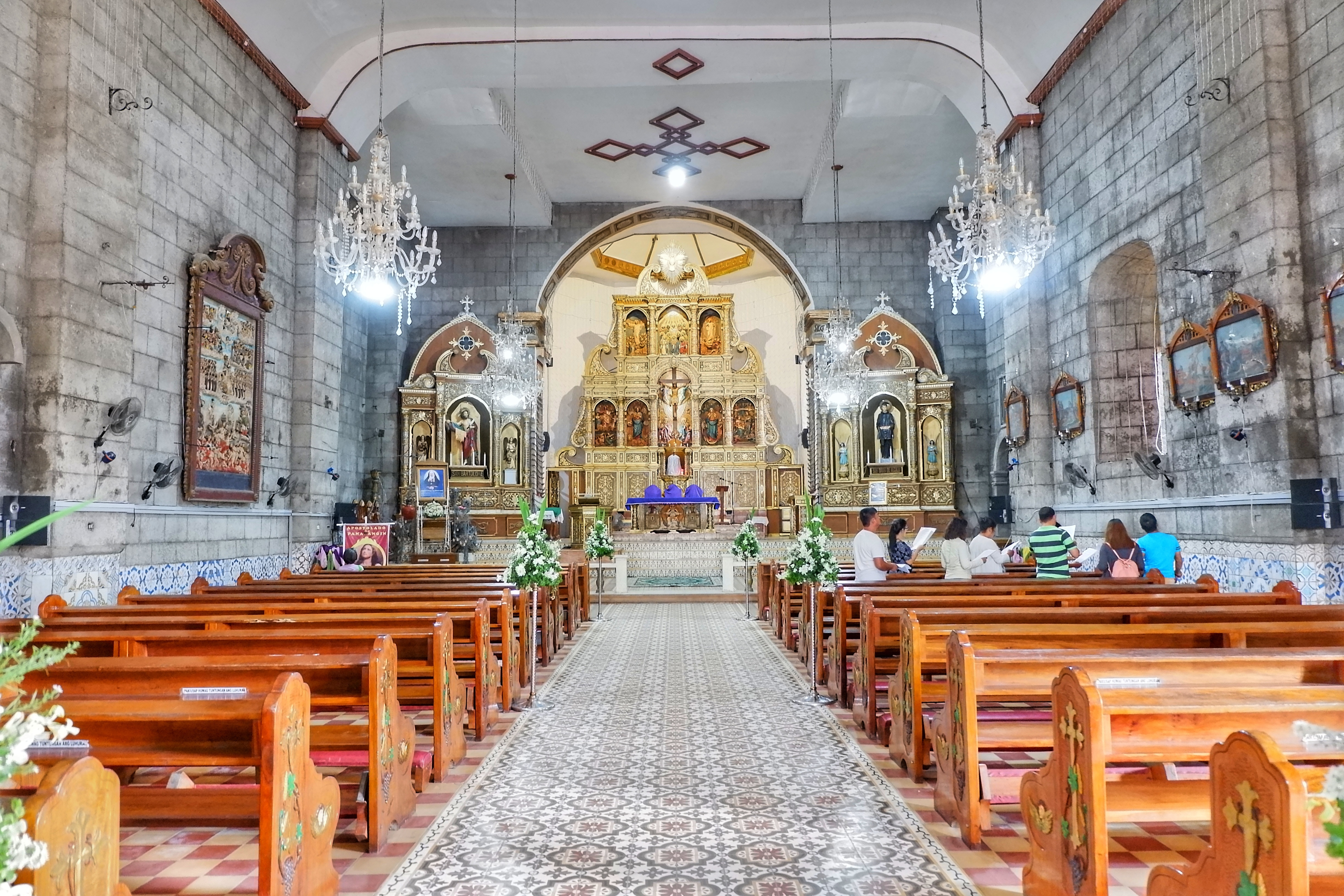
Church interior in 2018

The tiered-wall Nagcarlan church generally falls under the Baroque style. The design of the facade has a semicircular arched main entrance along with semicircular windows and tall pedestals and columns which are also present in the church's side entrance. The octagonal, four-storey volcanic tuff stone and brick bell tower has seven bells with the Franciscan coat of arms (crossed arms of Christ and St. Francis of Assisi) the tower used to have Muslim-inspired crenelations (defensive battlements) before it had its current baroque, bell-shaped roof.

== In popular culture ==
The church was featured in the 1974 movie "Kampanerang Kuba" starring Vilma Santos and its teleserye remake, an ABS-CBN television series starring Anne Curtis in 2005.

== See also ==
- Nagcarlan Underground Cemetery

== Bibliography ==
- Huerta, Felix de (1865). Estado geográfico, topográfico, estadístico, histórico-religioso. Binondo: Imprenta de M. Sanchez y Ca.
- Historical Markers: Regions I-IV and CAR (in Filipino). Manila: National Historical Institute (Philippines). 1993. p. 76. ISBN 9715380611.
