= Alice Doria-Gamilla =

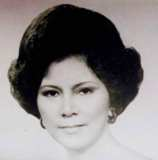

Background information
- Born: September 20, 1931 (age 93)

Alice Doria-Gamilla (born 20 September 1931) is a composer whose works include the 1960 song "A Million Thanks to You," which was later covered by Pilita Corrales in the first Philippine recording to sell a million copies. It became the signature song of Pilita's musical television show An Evening with Pilita and was later recorded by Bobbi Martin of the Jackie Gleason Show in the United States under Coral Records. The song was recorded in seven languages.

Born in Nagcarlan, Laguna, Philippines, Doria-Gamilla could play the piano by ear at the age of three and began formal instruction when she was six. She was raised in an atmosphere of music teaching by her mother (Socorro Plantilla Cuento), father (Santos Montañano Doria) and elder sister (Consuelo Cuento Doria).

She completed Elementary Teacher's Certificate at the National University. She first worked as a critic teacher for two years at the Elementary Department of National University. She became the pianist of the Division City schools of Manila, and a demonstrator and choral conductor of teachers and children's group.

As a new discovered composer in 1964, she was featured as a pianist playing her own compositions in The Television Filipinesque Show in Channel 3 sponsored by Northern Motors in coordination with Music Promotion Foundation of the Philippines. Another song she composed was "Sa Lahat ng Oras".

She received a Bachelor of Science in education, Magna Cum Laude, at the National University, Manila, in 1965. She continued her music studies at the University of Santo Tomas and majored in piano under Professor Bernardino Custodio. She further studied composition under Professor Felipe Padilla de Leon.

She has composed more than 300 published and unpublished, recorded and unrecorded songs. She appeared in various concerts for socio-civic organizations, radio and television shows both in the Philippines and in the U.S. Doria-Gamilla received numerous awards and citations in the musical arts sector including the "Gintong Ina" award for the musical arts sector in 1982. She was a member of the board of trustees of the Filipino Society of Composers, Authors and Publishers FILSCAP for many years.

== Awards and honors ==
- Best Drama Television Series Citation (as author-composer of the dramatic story "A Million Thanks to You" 1964
- Featured as one of the four (4) selected women composers at the Tinig ng Kababaihan concert, 1975
- Certificate of Appreciation, University of the Philippines College of Music, 1975
