= National University (Philippines) =

Private university in Manila, Philippines

- Pamantasang Pambansa, Pamantasang Nasyonal (Filipino)
- Former names: Colegio Filipino (1900–1905); Colegio Mercantil (1905–1916); National Academy (1916–1921)
- Motto: Education that works
- Type: Non-stock, Non-profit; Private nonsectarian higher education institution
- Established: August 1, 1900
- Founder: Mariano F. Jhocson Sr.
- Academic affiliations: PACUCOA; PACU; ASAIHL; IAU
- Chairman: Hans T. Sy, Sr.
- President: Renato Carlos H. Ermita, Jr.
- Students: c. 10,000 (A.Y. 2021-22)
- Location: 551 M.F. Jhocson Street, Sampaloc, Manila, Philippines; 14°36′15″N 120°59′39″E
- Campus: Main Campus NU Manila (Sampaloc, Manila) Satellite Campuses; NU Nazareth School (Manila City); NU Laguna (Calamba City, Laguna); NU Fairview (Quezon City); NU Mendiola (Manila City); NU MOA (Pasay City); NU Baliwag (Baliuag City, Bulacan); NU Dasmariñas (Dasmariñas City, Cavite); NU Lipa (Lipa City, Batangas); NU Clark (Angeles City); NU Asia Pacific College (Makati City); NU East Ortigas (Pasig City); NU Bacolod (Bacolod City; NU Cebu (Cebu City))
- Alma mater song: Adieu Alma Mater!
- Colors: Blue and Gold
- Nickname: NU Bulldogs
- Sporting affiliations: UAAP
- Mascot: Bulldog
- Website: www.national-u.edu.ph
- Location in Manila Location in Metro Manila Location in Luzon Location in the Philippines

National University (Filipino: Pamantasang Pambansa) commonly known as NU or "ENYU", colloquially National U, is a private non–sectarian university located in Sampaloc, Manila, Philippines. The founder of the university, Mariano F. Jhocson Sr., established the institution on August 1, 1900, as Colegio Filipino along Palma Street, Quiapo, Manila. It is considered as the first private nonsectarian and coeducational institution in the Philippines and the first university in the country to use English as its medium of instruction instead of Spanish.

From its main campus in Sampaloc, the university has been expanding with secondary campuses: NU Nazareth School, NU Laguna (Sports Academy), NU Fairview, NU Mall of Asia, NU Baliwag, NU Dasmariñas, NU Lipa, NU Clark, and NU Bacolod, among others. Additionally, the institution leased a part of the lot and buildings of the former College of the Holy Spirit Manila in Mendiola, Manila and will be known as the NU Manila College of Business and Accountancy, Mendiola.

Approved by the Department of Public Instruction on June 17, 1921, it changed to its present name upon receiving university status. Senator Camilo Osías, two-time Senate President of the Philippines, served as the first University President (1921-1936). The current university president is Renato Carlos H. Ermita, Jr. (2008–present) and its current majority owner is the SM Group.

Logotype of National University

NU is one of the pioneer members of National Collegiate Athletic Association- Philippines (NCAA) and the University Athletic Association of the Philippines (UAAP), and also a pioneer member of the Philippine Association of Colleges and Universities (PACU). Its international affiliations and memberships include the Association of Southeast Asian Institutions of Higher Learning (ASAHIL) and the International Association of Universities (IAU).

== History ==
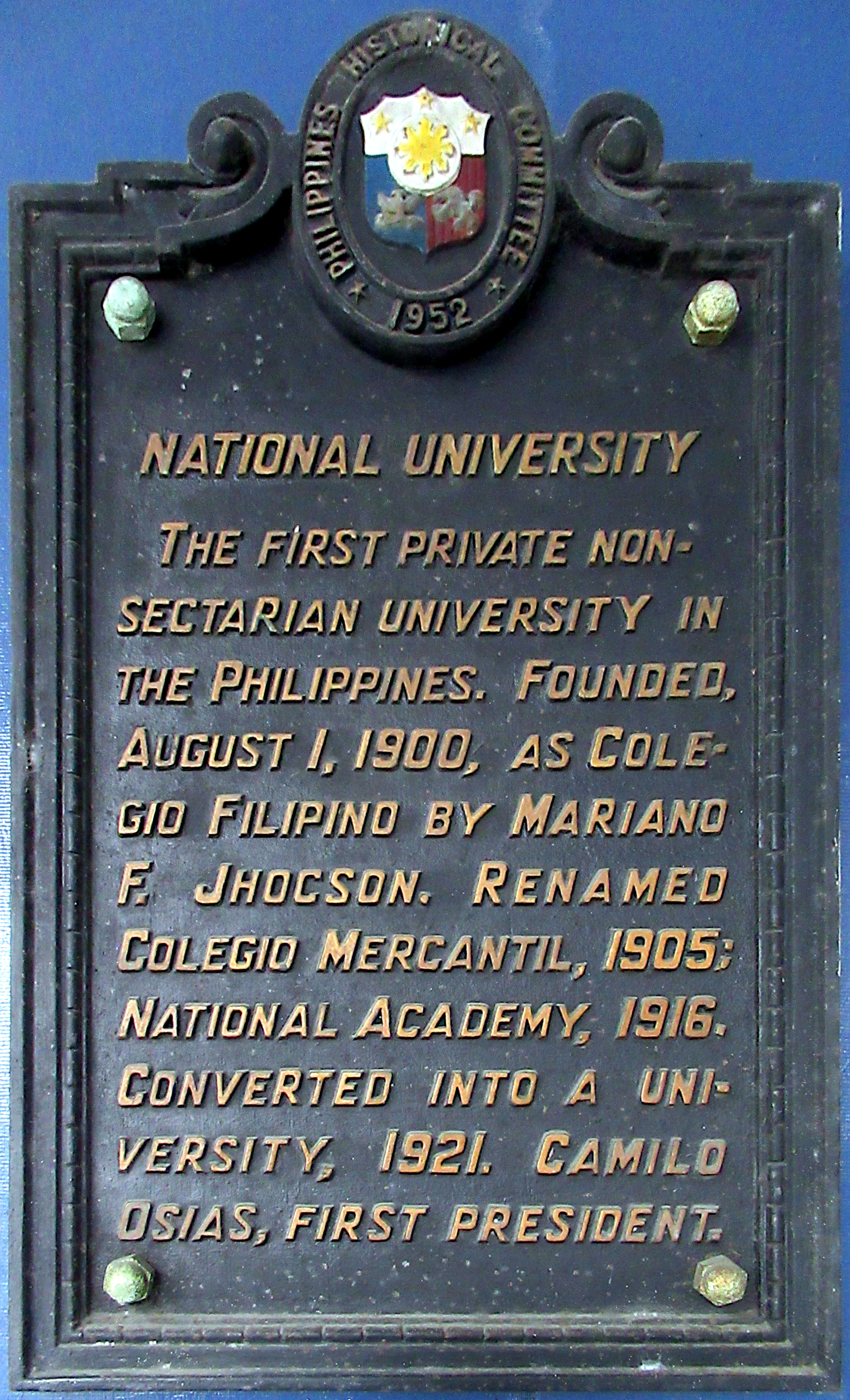
Historical marker installed by the Philippines Historical Committee in 1952

National University's school seal from 2010 to 2017

Mariano F. Jhocson Sr. founded Colegio Filipino on August 1, 1900, at the Jhocson Residence on Palma Street, Quiapo, Manila. Only a handful of students enrolled in the fledgling school for both elementary and secondary levels. Mariano Sr. served as the college director, instructor, and janitor. He began business courses in bookkeeping and accounting. This prompted a name change as it became known as Colegio Mercantil, awarding the diploma of Perito Mercantil. A short time later, Jhocson Sr. collaborated with lawyers Simeón C. Lacson and Ricardo Lacson and established the Philippine Law School. From Colegio Mercantil, the Board of Trustees changed the name of the institution to National Academy in 1916 and continuous growth led to the introduction of liberal arts courses.

After 21 years of service in the field of education, the Board of Trustees applied for university status to the Department of Public Instruction. Thus, the school became known as National University on June 17, 1921. That same day, Senator Camilo Osías, a Filipino educator, was made the first president of the university. The Colleges of Education and Commerce were opened in the same year, with the Colleges of Pharmacy and Dentistry following in 1922. The College of Engineering, initially offering Civil Engineering opened in 1925, and the Normal School in 1930. Sanitary Engineering was offered in 1930. Bachelor's degrees in Chemical, Electrical, Industrial, Mechanical Engineering and Architecture and Arts were opened. Master in Sanitary Engineering was also organized. Computer Science was opened in 1990, Marine Engineering, Computer Engineering and Electronics and Communications Engineering in 1994. College of Nursing was offered in 2004, Hotel and Restaurant Management in 2008 and Information Technology in 2009.

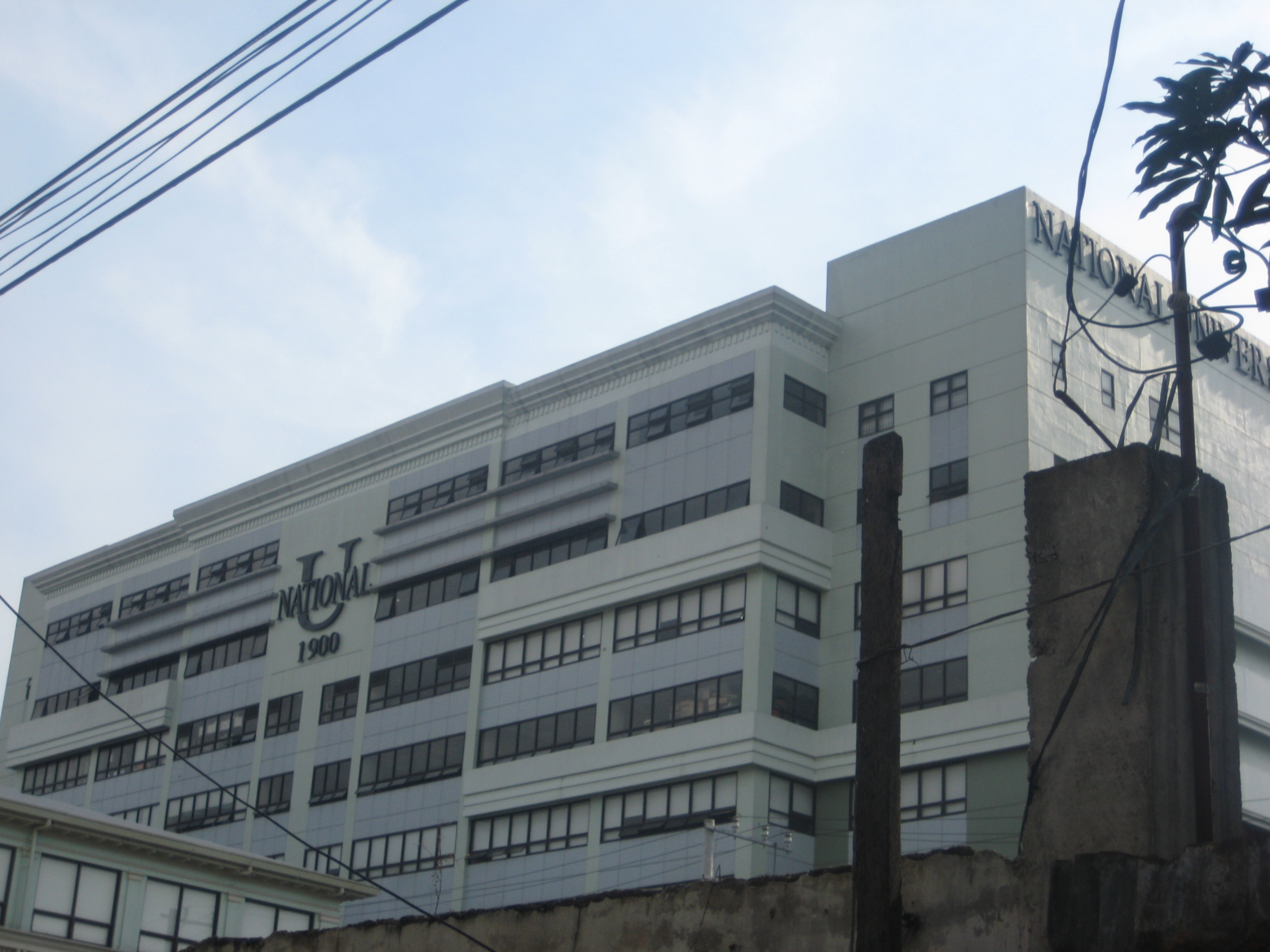
NU Manila facade

A fire broke out on January 1, 1998, and razed four buildings of the university: the old Main Building, Law and Commerce Building, Elementary Building, and Graduate School Building. The university was able to re-open its doors after three weeks of restoration work and used Mariano Jhocson Memorial Building. The College of Dentistry Building (renamed Camilo Osias Hall), built in the 1920s, thus became the oldest extant building of the NU campus.

In 2008, SM Investments acquired majority ownership of National University.

A new logo for National University was unveiled on October 17, 2017. The new brand features the school's colors and a shield inspired by the old university logo.

As the institution grows so as their demand for a bigger campus increases which led to the birth NU Main Building Expansion. The expansion is built to cater approximately 10,000 students in the coming years. The expansion will be a 12-storey building which is physically connected to the existing 8-storey Mariano Jhocson Memorial building. The whole development will have a gross floor area of approximately 40,000sm. Additional facilities will be an indoor swimming pool, indoor futsal, basketball court, Physical Education center, and fitness room.

== University emblem ==
Blue and gold

The University Logo The logo for the National University (NU) of the Philippines features a shield with the school's colors, gold and blue. The university officially unveiled the current version of the logo on October 17, 2017. The National University (NU) logo was designed by José Joya, a National Artist for Visual Arts in the Philippines.

Flag of National University
- Adopted: October 17, 2017
- Design: This flag design is a horizontal triband (specifically a fess) with a central charge. At the center is the logo or seal of National University
- Designed by: Unknown

=== The University Flag ===
This flag design is a horizontal triband (specifically a fess) with a central charge. At the center is the logo or seal of National University unveiled on October 17, 2017. This flag was also used beside it.

The University Colors The official colors of National University (NU) are Navy Blue and Gold.

The University Mascot The mascot of National University (NU) is the Bulldog.

== Academics ==
National University Manila offers twenty-four undergraduate degrees in its eight colleges. It also offers basic education via the NU Nazareth School. National University's basic education unit and Nazareth School merged in 2013. During the 2020–2021 school year, NU Nazareth had a student population of 13,729.

== Campuses ==
=== Laguna campus ===
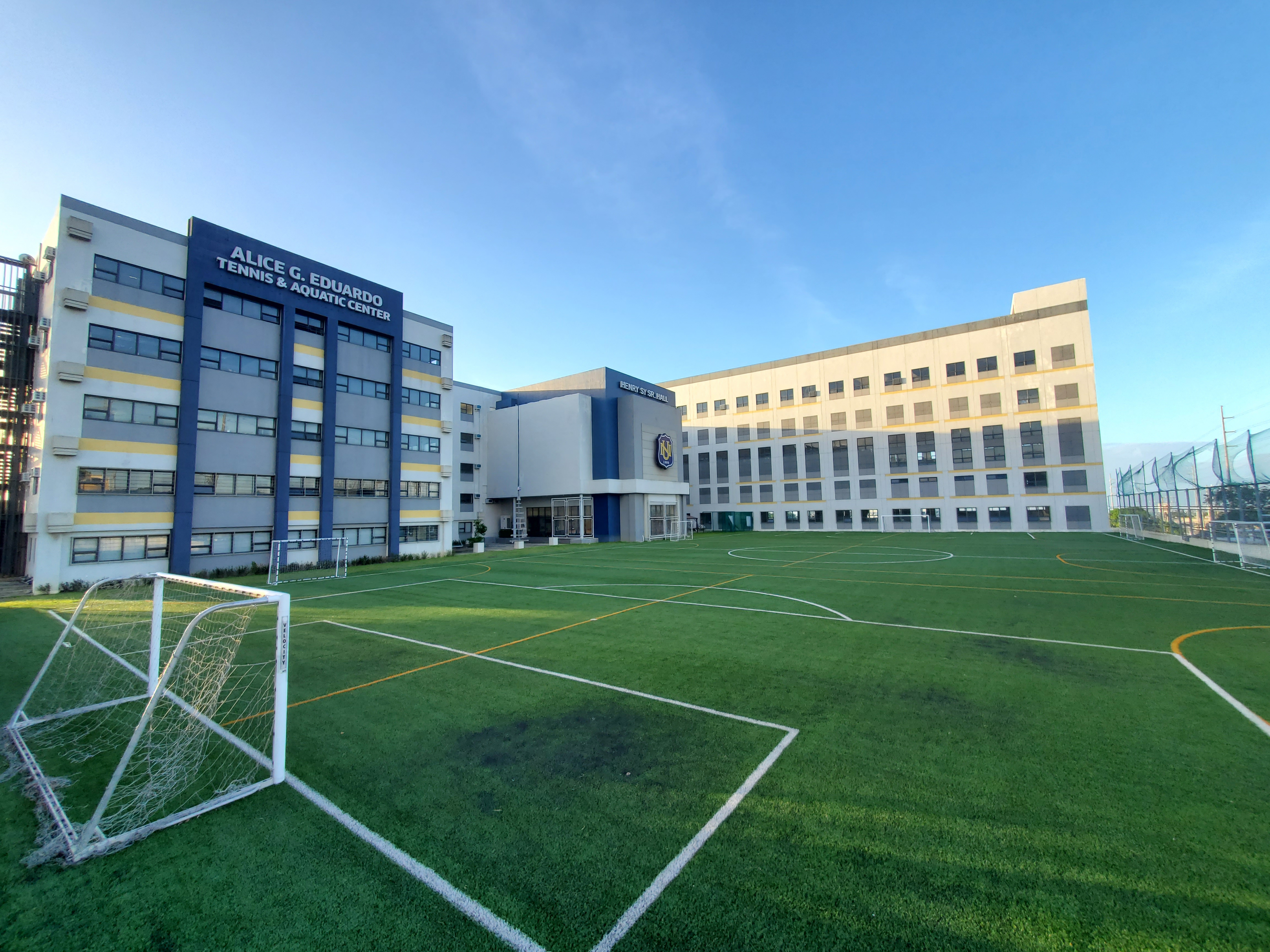
NU Laguna

National University has a satellite campus in Calamba, Laguna. The abandoned site of St. James College of Calamba was purchased by NU and it is now occupied by National University as a satellite campus. It is the first NU campus outside Metro Manila. The university opened its doors to students in the 2018–2019 school year.

=== Bacolod campus ===
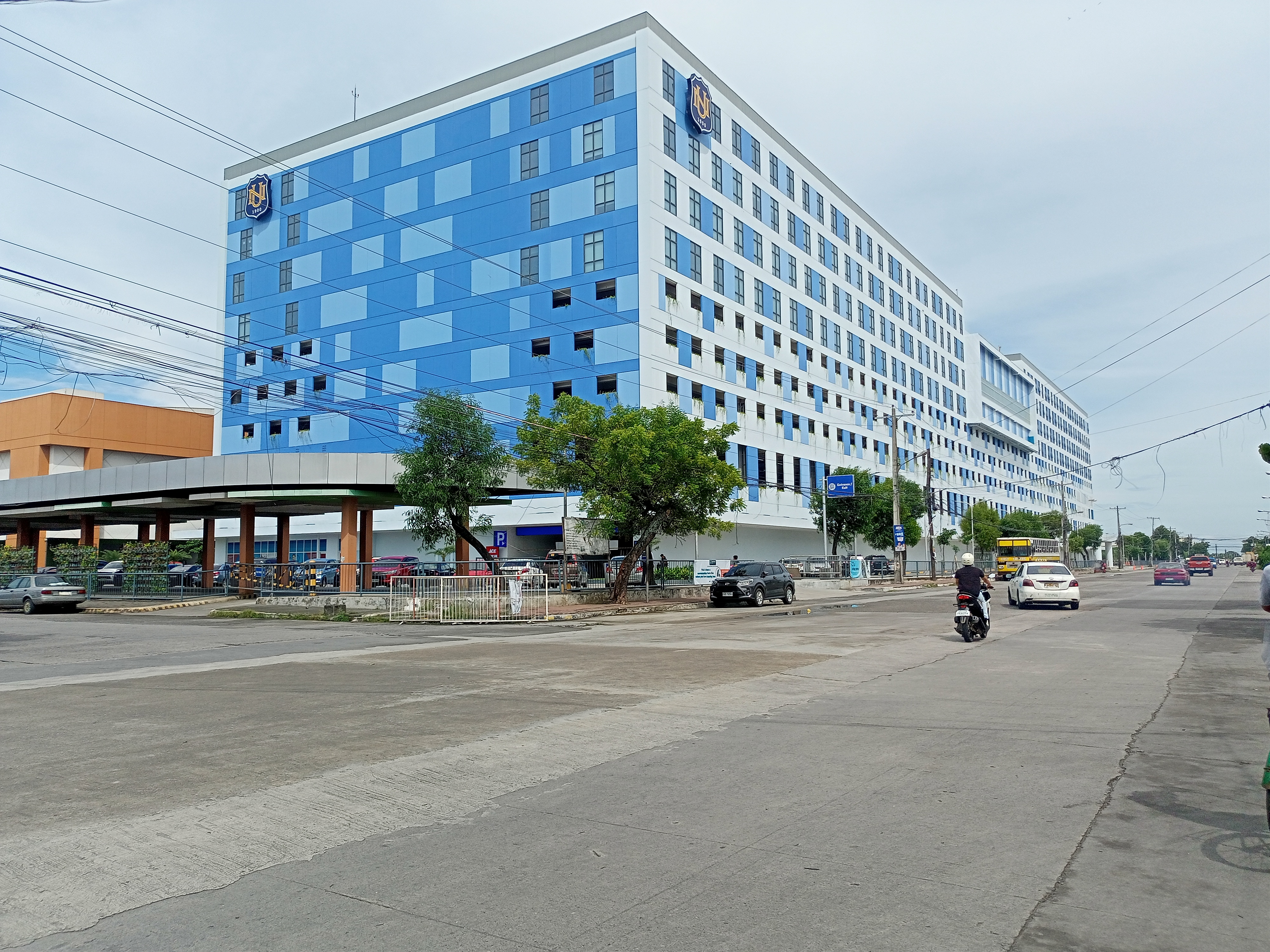
National University Bacolod

The National University Bacolod (NU Bacolod or NUB) in Bacolod City is the school's first satelitte campus in the Visayas-Mindanao region and also the first one outside Luzon. It is the 11th overall campus of the university. It is located beside SM City Bacolod at Bishop Antonio Y. Fortich Avenue, Reclamation Area, Barangay 12 and its first operations started from school year 2024 to 2025. It offers Senior High School and college courses. Senior High School programs include: Accountancy, Business, and Management (ABM), Science, Technology, Engineering, and Mathematics (STEM), and Humanities and Social Sciences (HUMSS). Its college programs include Bachelor of Science in Accountancy, Bachelor of Science in Computer Science, Bachelor of Science in Psychology, Bachelor of Science in Tourism Management, Bachelor of Science in Architecture, Bachelor of Science in Civil Engineering, Bachelor of Science in Management Accounting, Bachelor of Science in Medical Technology, and Bachelor of Science in Political Science.

=== Lipa campus ===
The National University Lipa (NU Lipa or NULP) in Lipa City, Batangas is the school's first campus in the Batangas province, and the third on Region IV-A. Its six-floor campus building is situated behind SM City Lipa in Ayala Highway, Lipa City. Their operations started on school year 2022-2023 with more than 900 students. It offers the Senior High School curriculum, with academic tracks/strands. In addition, they also offer college undergraduate and extension graduate programs.

NU Campuses around the Philippines
NU Campuses around Metro Manila

=== List of campuses ===
National University
Campus	Academics	Location	Opened	Designation
NU Manila	List: College of Allied Health; College of Architecture, Planning and Sustainable Built Environment; College of Computing & Information Technologies; College of Education, Arts & Sciences; College of Engineering; College of Tourism & Hospitality Management	Sampaloc, City of Manila	1900	Main Campus
NU Mendiola	List: College of Business and Accountancy	Mendiola	2024	NU Manila Annex
NU Nazareth School	List: Preschool; Grade school; Junior High School; Senior High School	Sampaloc, City of Manila	1900	Basic Education
NU MOA	List: Senior High School; College of Accountancy & Management; College of Allied Health; College of Architecture; College of Computing & Information Technologies; College of Dentistry; College of Education, Arts & Sciences; School of Optometry	Pasay City	2019	Allied Health Campus (Manila Extension)
NU Laguna & INSPIRE Sports Academy	List: Senior High School; College of Business & Accountancy; College of Computing & Information Technologies; College of Education, Arts & Sciences; College of Engineering & Architecture; Graduate School	Calamba City, Laguna	2019	First overall satellite campus
NU Fairview	List: Senior High School; College of Architecture; College of Arts & Sciences; College of Business & Accountancy; College of Engineering & Technology; College of Tourism & Hospitality Management	Quezon City	2019	
NU Baliwag	List: Senior High School; College of Business & Accountancy; College of Computing & Information Technologies; College of Education, Arts & Sciences; College of Engineering & Technology	Baliuag City, Bulacan	2019	
NU Dasmariñas	List: Senior High School; College of Architecture; College of Business & Accountancy; College of Computing & Information Technologies; College of Education, Arts & Sciences; College of Engineering	Dasmariñas City, Cavite	2021	
NU Lipa	List: Senior High School; College of Accountancy, Business & Management; College of Allied Health; College of Architecture, Computing & Engineering; College of Education, Arts & Sciences; Graduate School	Lipa City, Batangas	2022	
NU Clark	List: Senior High School; College of Architecture, Engineering & Technology; College of Business & Accountancy; College of Computing & Information Technologies; College of Education, Arts & Sciences; College of Tourism & Hospitality Management	Mabalacat City, Pampanga	2023	
NU Bacolod	List: Senior High School; School of Accountancy, Business, and Management (SABM); School of Education, Arts & Sciences (SEAS); School of Engineering, Computing, and Architecture (SECA)	Bacolod City	July 2024	First satellite campus outside Luzon
NU East Ortigas	List: Senior High School; College of Engineering & Technology; College of Education, Arts & Sciences; College of Tourism & Hospitality Management	Pasig City	2024	
NU Cebu	to be determined	Cebu City	2025	
NU Las Piñas	to be determined	Las Piñas City	2025	adjacent to SM Southmall
NU Davao	to be determined	Davao City	2026	One of the first satellite campuses in Mindanao
NU Alabang	to be determined	Muntinlupa City	to be determined in 2026	
NU Iloilo	to be determined	Iloilo City	to be determined in 2027	
NU Legazpi	to be determined	Legazpi City, Albay	to be determined in 2027	
NU Urdaneta	to be determined	Urdaneta City, Pangasinan	to be determined	
Asia Pacific College	List: Senior High School; School of Computing & Information Technology; School of Engineering; School of Management; School of Multimedia & Arts; Graduate School	Makati	1991	NU Makati

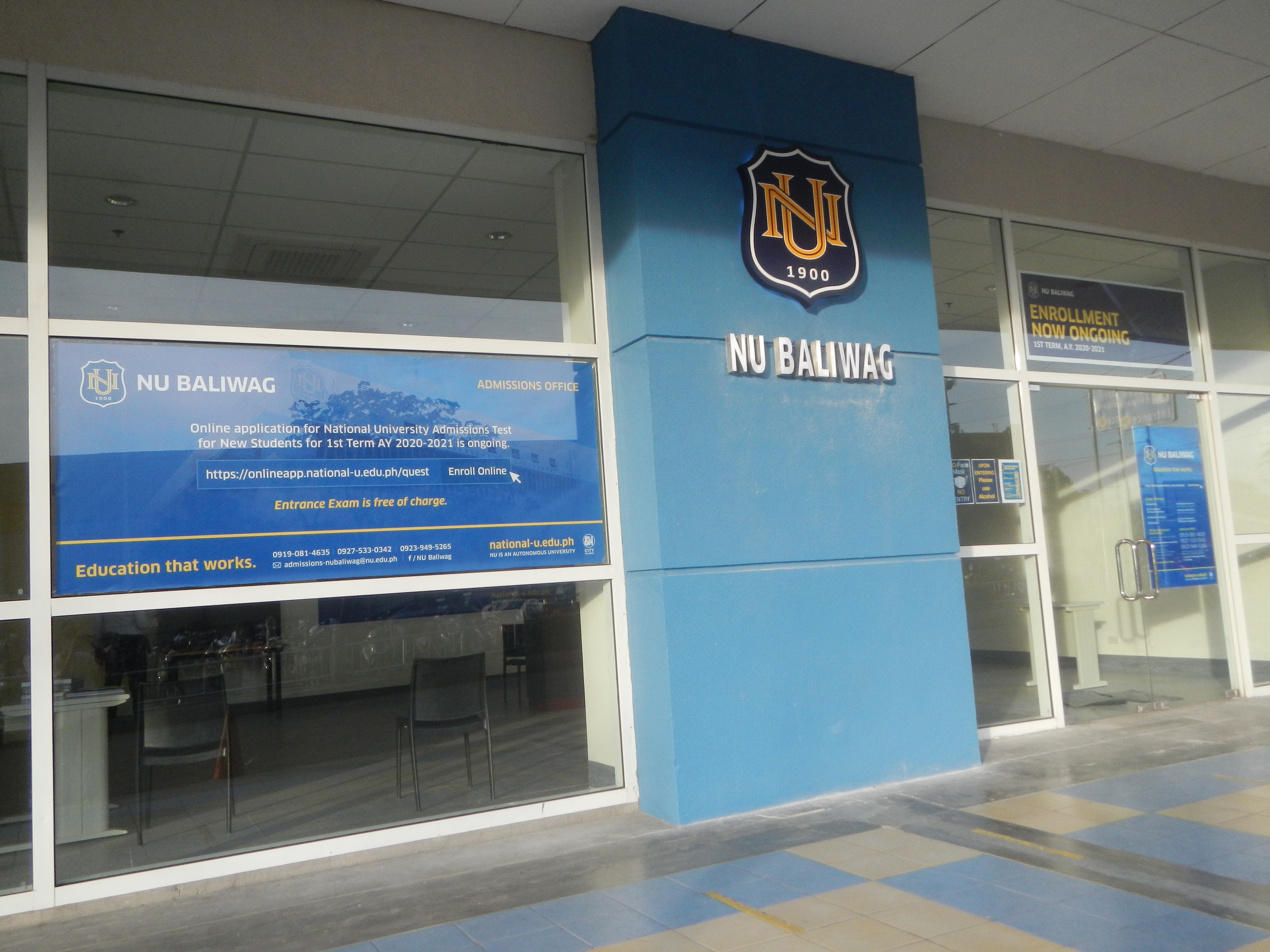
NU Baliwag

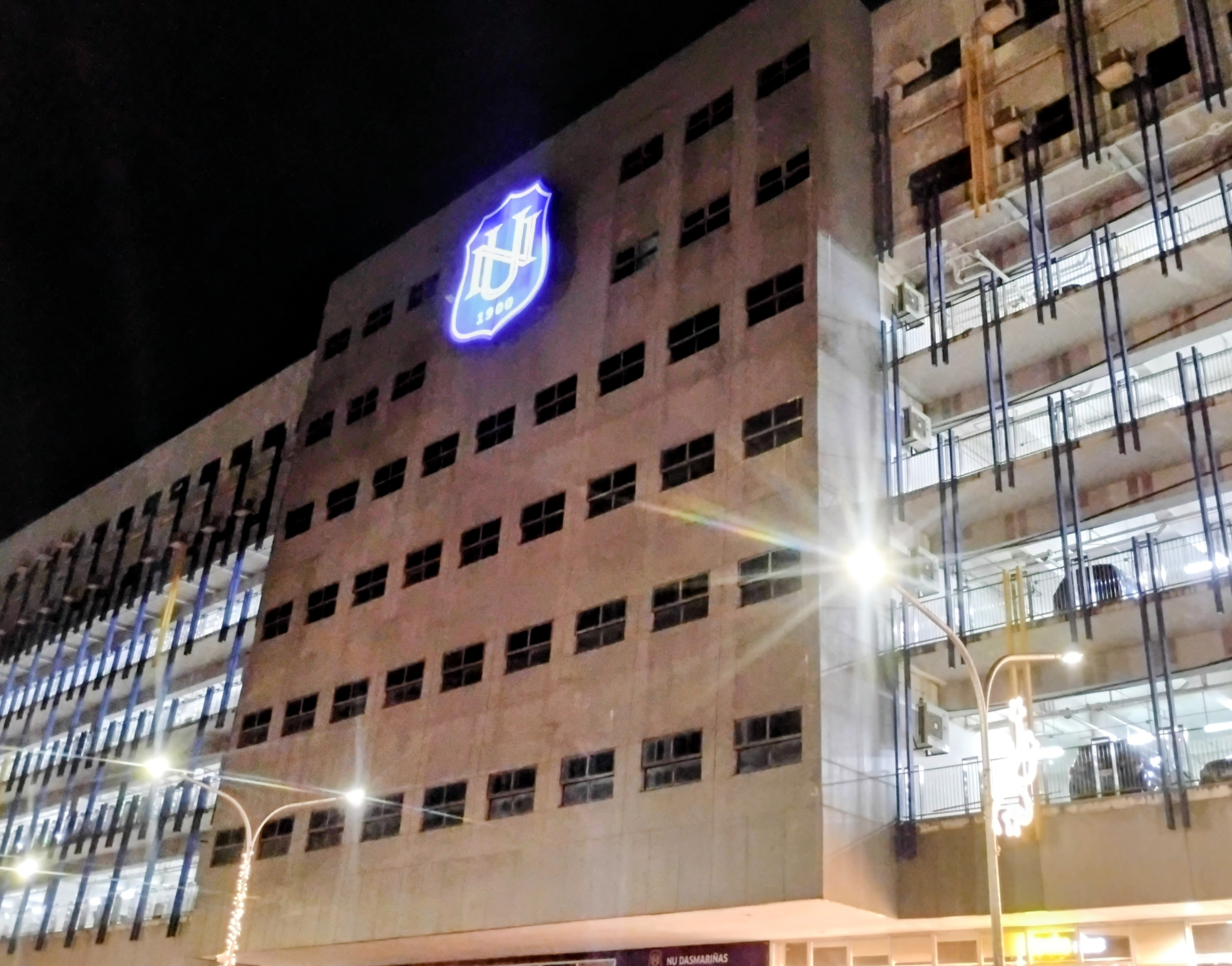
NU Dasmariñas

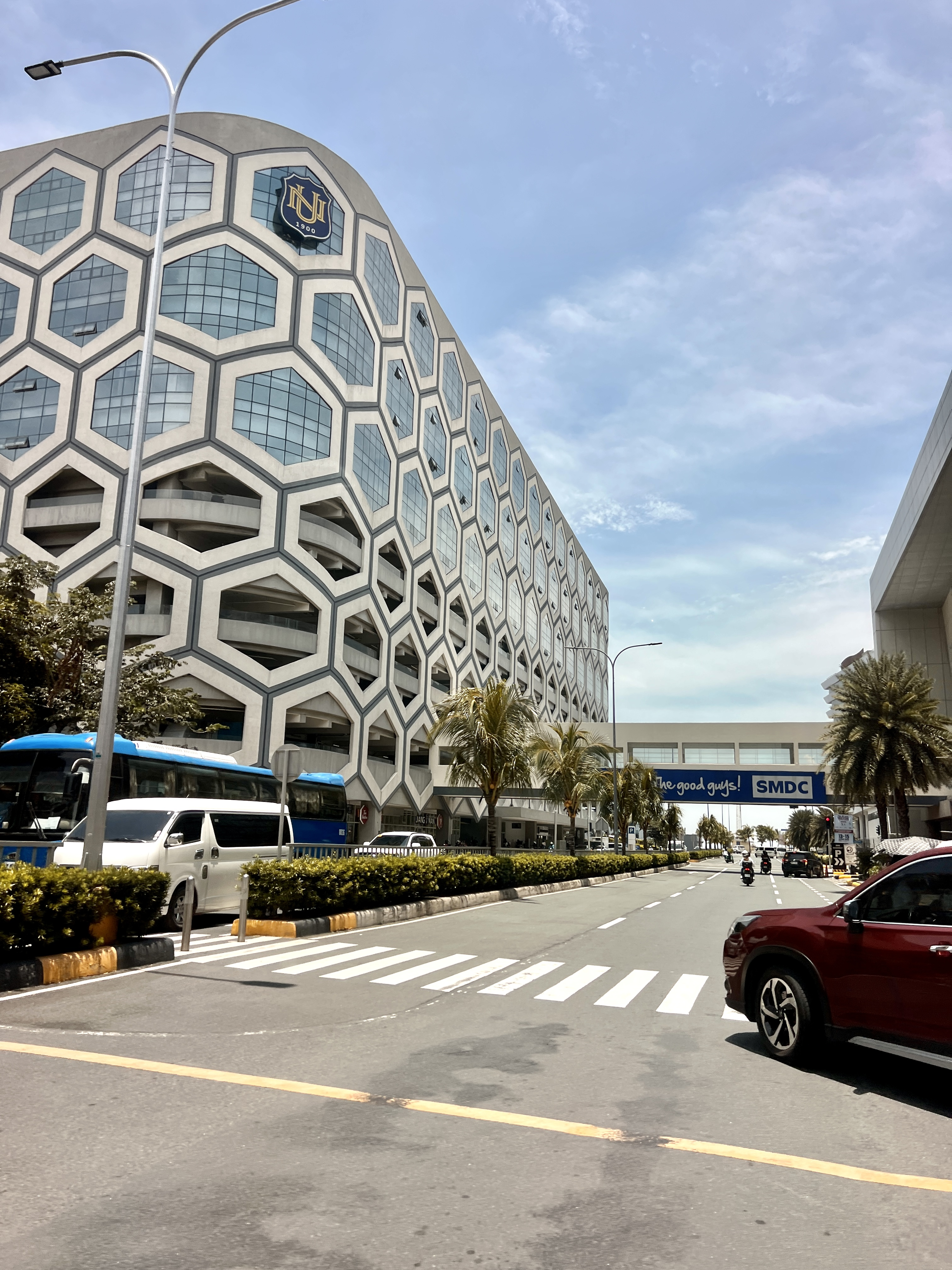
NU Mall of Asia

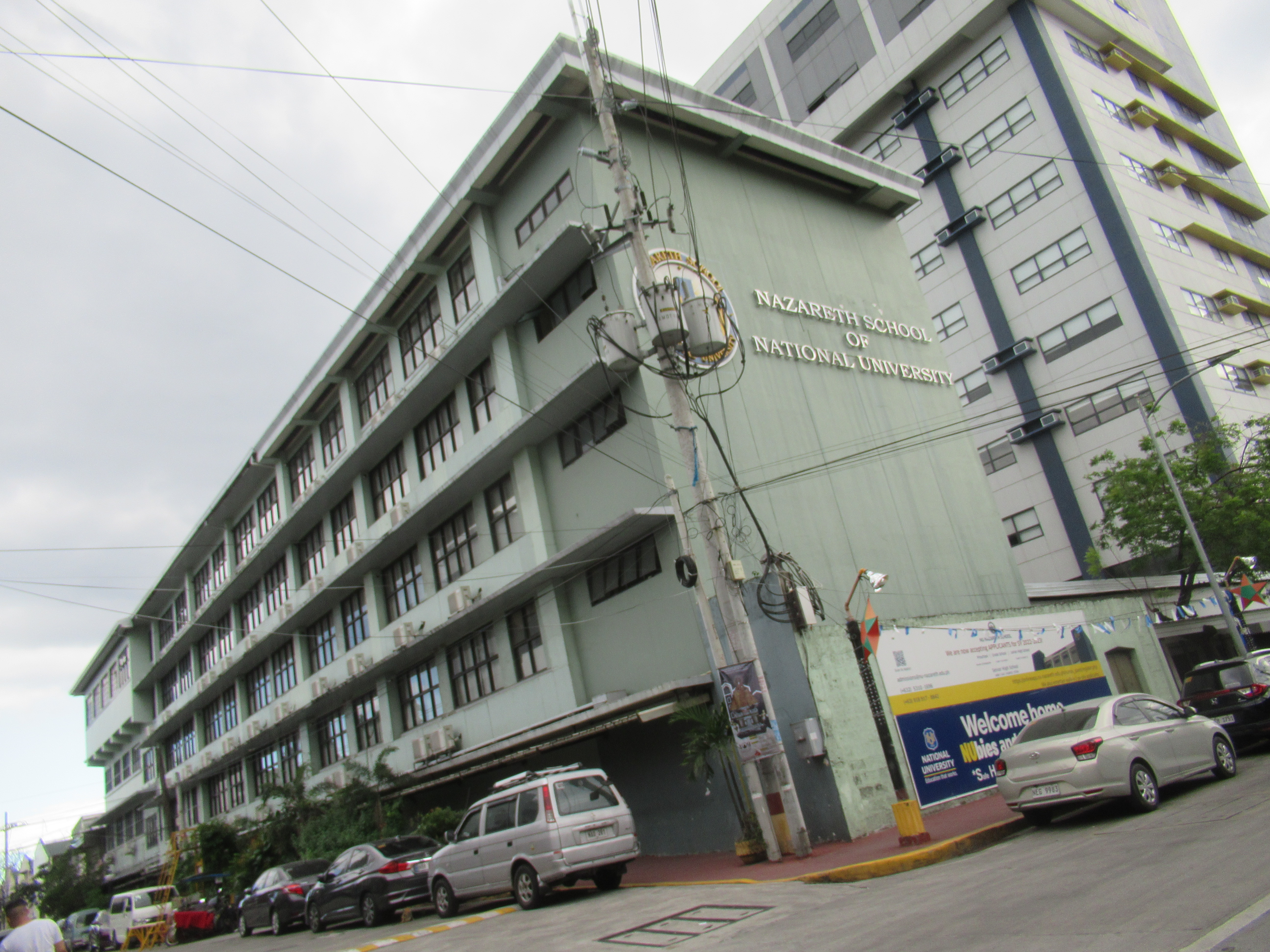
NU Nazareth School

== Accreditations and affiliations ==
National University is an accredited member of various National and International Organizations:

- Association of Southeast Asian Institutions of Higher Learning (ASAIHL)
- International Association of Universities (IAU)
- Philippine Association of Colleges and Universities (PACU)
- Philippine Association of Colleges and Universities Commission on Accreditation (PACUCOA)
- University Athletic Association of the Philippines (UAAP)

== Athletics ==
=== NU Bulldogs ===
National University was one of the schools that founded the Philippine National Collegiate Athletic Association (NCAA) in 1924. It was one of the three schools that left the NCAA in 1932 and formed a new athletic association named the University Athletic Association of the Philippines (UAAP) in 1938.

In the UAAP, NU has teams participating in twelve sports out of fifteen, namely; cheerleading, basketball, indoor volleyball, beach volleyball, football, baseball, softball, tennis, table tennis, badminton, fencing, taekwondo and chess.

The university's collegiate men's and women's varsity teams are called the National University Bulldogs and the Lady Bulldogs, respectively. The high school varsity teams are called the Bullpups and Lady Bullpups.

== Notable alumni ==
=== Government and public service ===
- Fidel V. Ramos - 12th President of the Philippines, Chief of Staff - Armed Forces of the Philippines, professional soldier, and 8th placer in the Civil Engineering Licensure Examination in 1953.
- Carlos P. Garcia - 8th President of the Philippines, lawyer, teacher, and poet. Bachelor of Laws (Philippine Law School), Doctor of Humanities (Honoris Causa) National University in 1961.
- Rafael P. Nantes - Licensed Mechanical Engineer, businessman, three-term Congressman, and former governor of Quezon
- Roy Cimatu - Retired Philippine Army general serving as the Secretary of Environment and Natural Resources since 2017 in the Cabinet of President Rodrigo Duterte. Former Chief of Staff of the Armed Forces of the Philippines from May to September 2002 under President Gloria Macapagal Arroyo. Appointed by President Gloria Macapagal Arroyo as the Special Envoy to the Middle East during the Iraq War
- Nicanor Faeldon - Former Jail Director-General of Bureau of Jail and Penology, Deputy Administrator III at the Office of Civil Defense (OCD), Former Commissioner of the Bureau of Customs, retired Philippine Marines Captain, and one of the leaders of the Oakwood mutiny that exposed corruption in the Philippine military. He is an awardee of a Gold Cross Medal, three Military Merit Medals (MMM), five Military Commendation Medal (MCM), a wounded personnel medal, and Luzon, Visayas, and Mindanao campaign medals.
- Bernardo M. Vergara - Congressman and former mayor of Baguio City
- Elisa Rosales Ochoa - The first woman elected to the Philippine Congress
- Mamintal Adiong, Sr. - Civil and Sanitary engineer, former governor of Lanao del Sur, former Deputy Minister of Public Works and Highways, former DPWH Undersecretary, former supervisor of Marawi Waterworks District, and a former international contractor in the Kingdom of Saudi Arabia
- Mamintal Alonto Adiong Jr. - Civil Engineer, Governor of Lanao del Sur
- Neptali Gonzales, Sr. - Graduated class valedictorian in the Philippine Law School. He placed ninth in the 1949 bar examinations with a grade of 92.50%. Vice-Governor of the Premier Province of Rizal (1967–1969), Congressman of the First District of Rizal (1969–1973). Assemblyman for the District of Mandaluyong-San Juan (1984–1986) and Senator for two consecutive terms (1987–1998). Before his election as Senator, he was appointed Minister and later Secretary of Justice (1986–1987)
- Nemesio Yabut - Former mayor of Makati from 1972 to 1986, Chairman of the Philippine Racing Commission from 1978 to 1986, played for the National University Bulldogs basketball team.

=== Literature ===
- Nestor Vicente Madali Gonzalez - National Artist of the Philippines for Literature

=== Media ===
- Joey de Leon - Filipino Comedian and Actor.
- Alice Doria-Gamilla - Composer of "A Million Thanks to You" using her original piano arrangement in 1960. The song was later on recorded by "Asia's Queen of Songs", Pilita Corrales which hit the millionth mark in sales which was a first in the Philippine recording history.
- Jestoni Alarcon (NU High School) - actor
- Roxlee (B.S. Arch) - Filipino animator, filmmaker, cartoonist (creator of Cesar Asar) and painter.
- Alexie Brooks - Most Valuable Player for UAAP Season 85 and Miss Eco International 2025

=== Sports ===
- Danny Ildefonso - Professional basketball player, two-time PBA Most Valuable Player and three-time PBA Finals Most Valuable Player awardee
- Lordy Tugade - Professional basketball player
- Carlos Loyzaga (NU High School) - basketball player and former Olympian
- Narciso Bernardo - basketball player and former Olympian
- Jun Papa - Filipino basketball player, played for the NU Bulldogs in the University Athletic Association of the Philippines, Ysmael Steel Admirals and the Crispa-Floro Redmanizers in the Manila Industrial and Commercial Athletic Association and at the Summer Olympic Games in 1968 and 1972 as a member of the country's national basketball team.
- Jefferson Napa - Former basketball player and current head coach of the men's basketball team
- Froilan Baguion - Professional basketball player
- Jonathan Fernandez - Professional basketball player
- Bobby Ray Parks Jr. - Most Valuable Player for UAAP Season 74 and 75
- Troy Rosario - Professional basketball player
- Glenn Khobuntin - Professional basketball player
- Jewel Ponferada - Professional basketball player
- Dindin Santiago-Manabat - Volleyball Player
- Jaja Santiago - Volleyball Player
- Myla Pablo - Volleyball Player, Shakey's V-League finals MVP
- Jennylyn Reyes - Volleyball Player, Best Libero in the 2015 Philippine Super Liga All-Filipino
- Tin Patrimonio - Tennis player, model, actress and a former reality show contestant
