= Nagcarlan =

Municipality in Laguna, Philippines

- Municipality
- Municipality of Nagcarlan
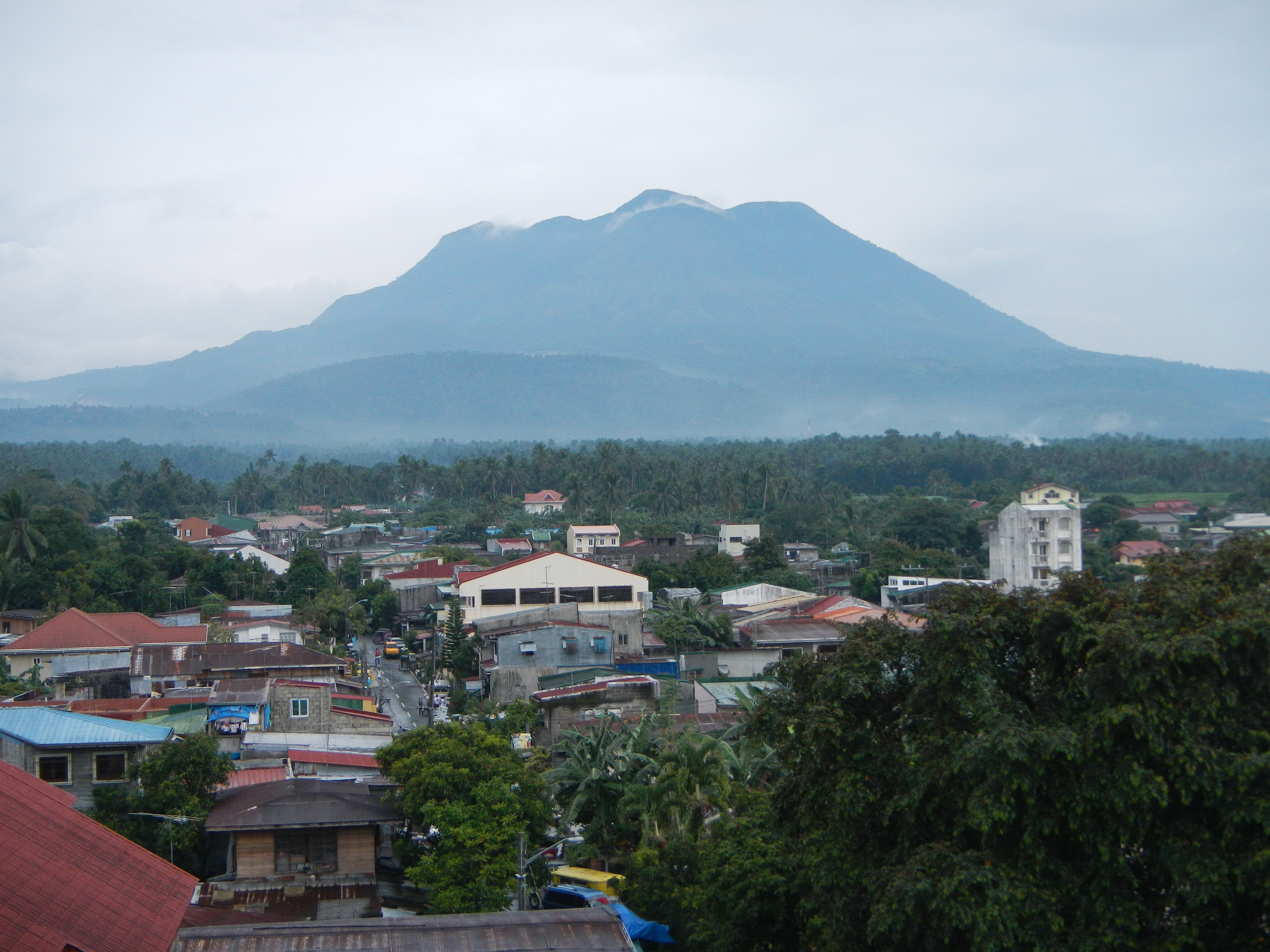
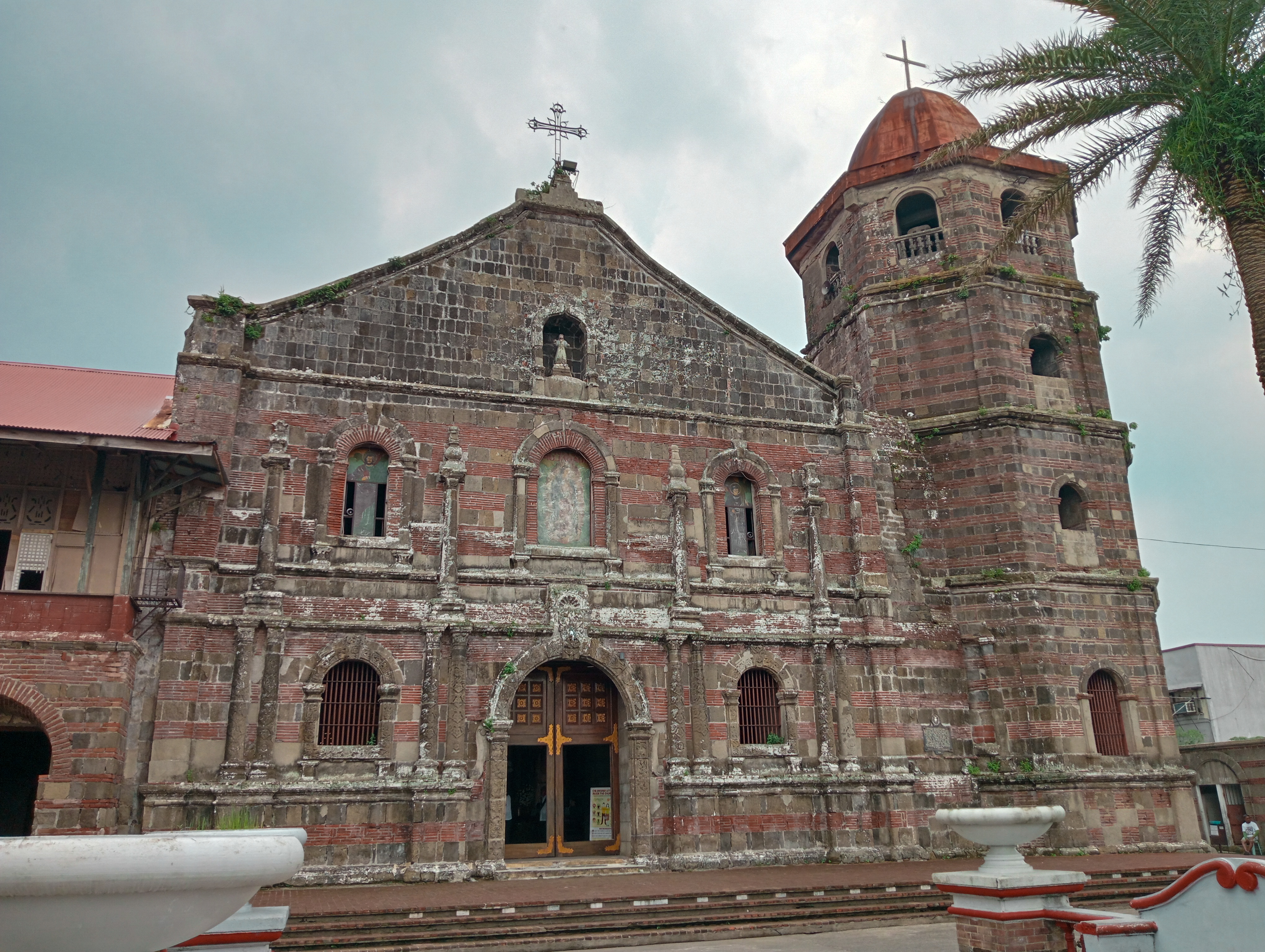
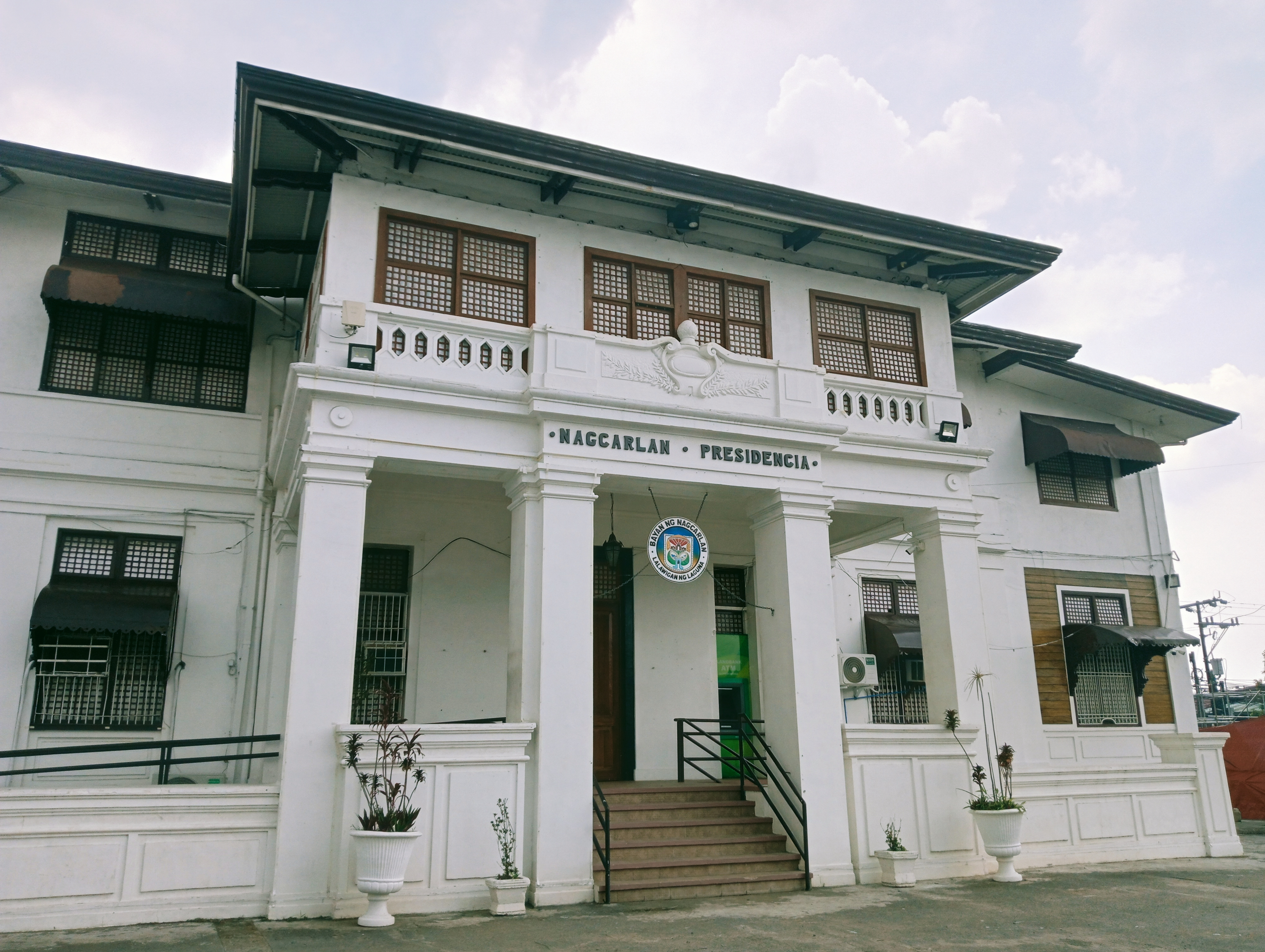
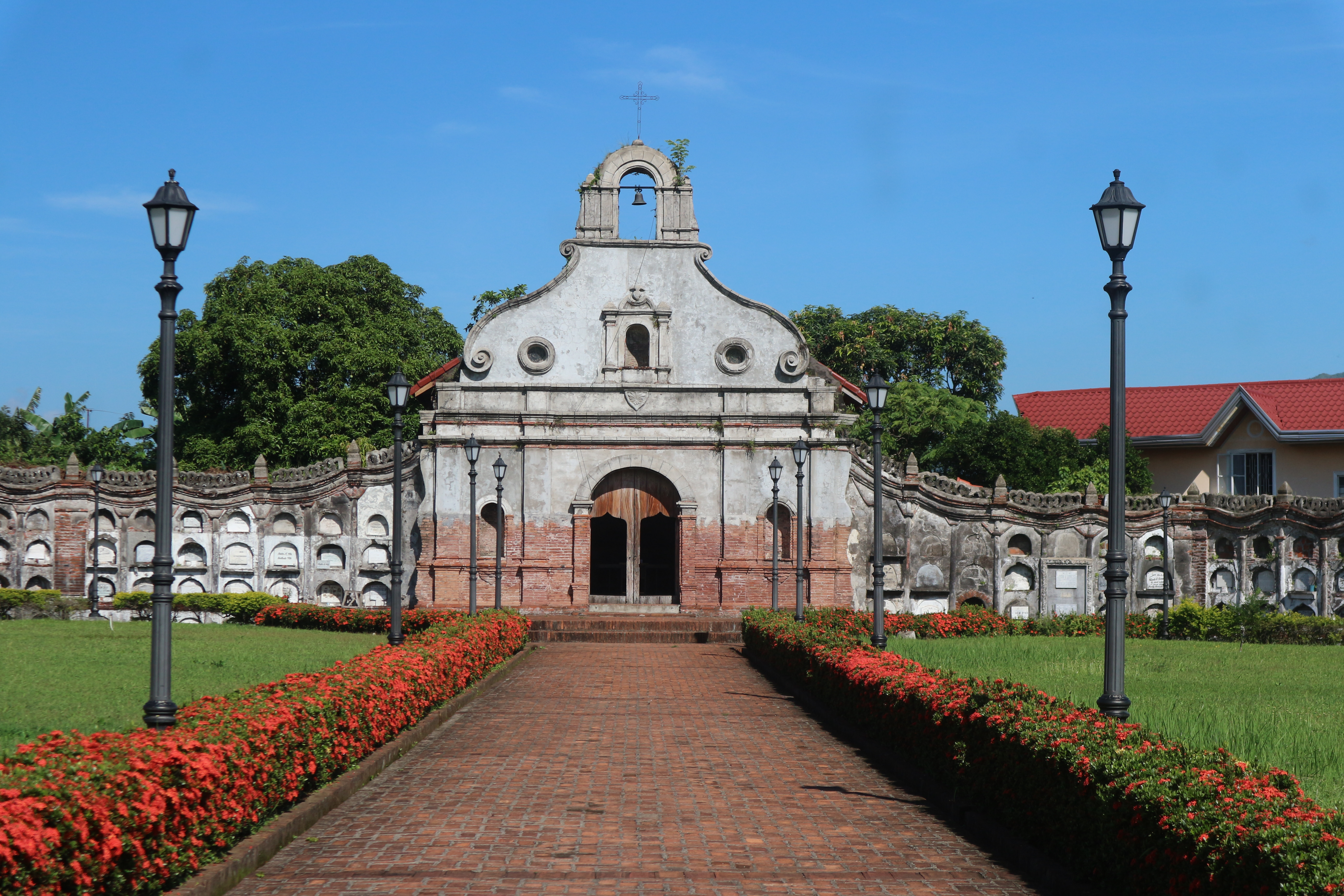
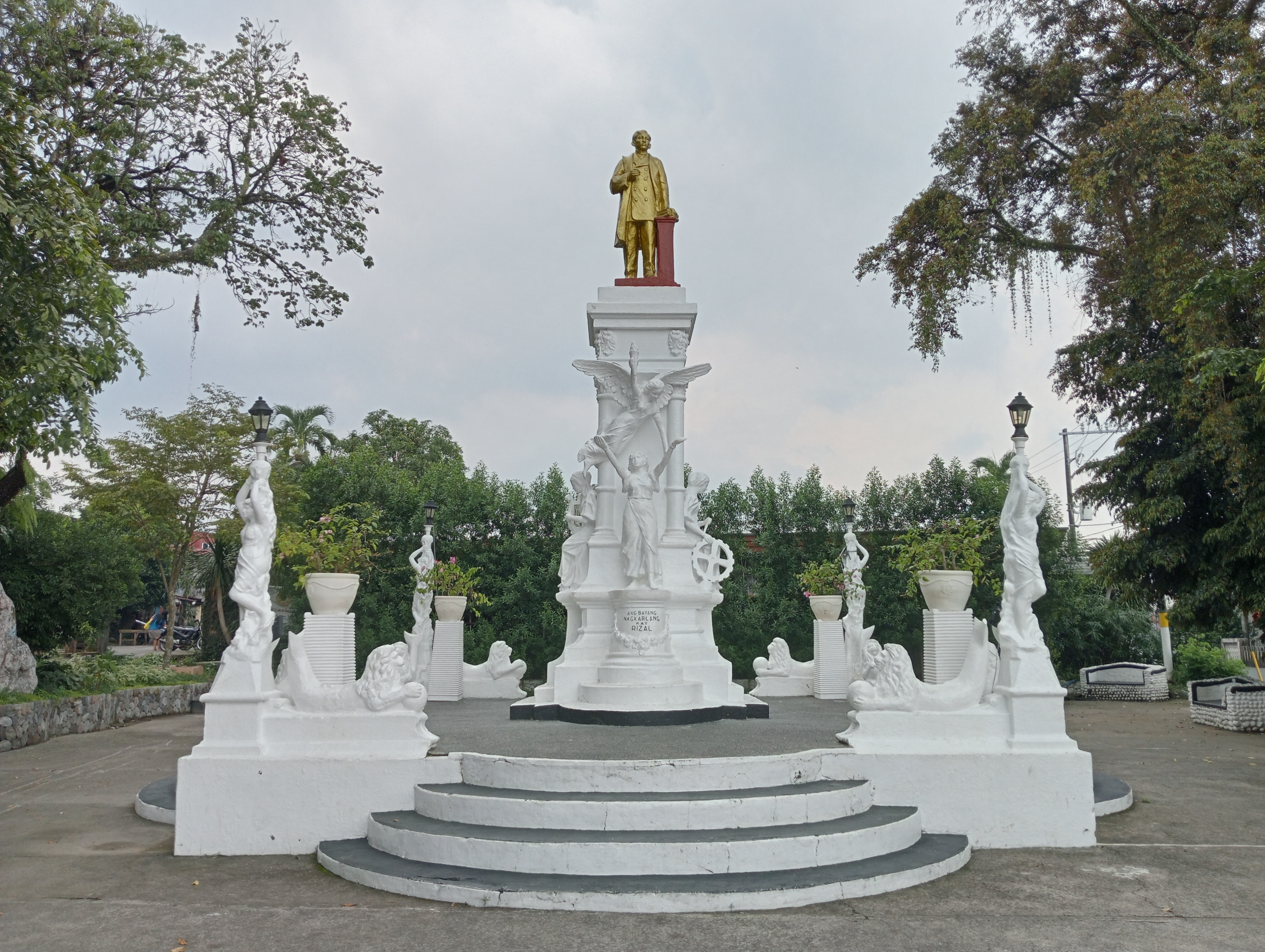
- Mount San Cristobal and Nagcarlan Town Proper San Bartolome Apostol Parish Church Nagcarlan Presidencia Nagcarlan Underground Cemetery Jose Rizal Monument of Nagcarlan

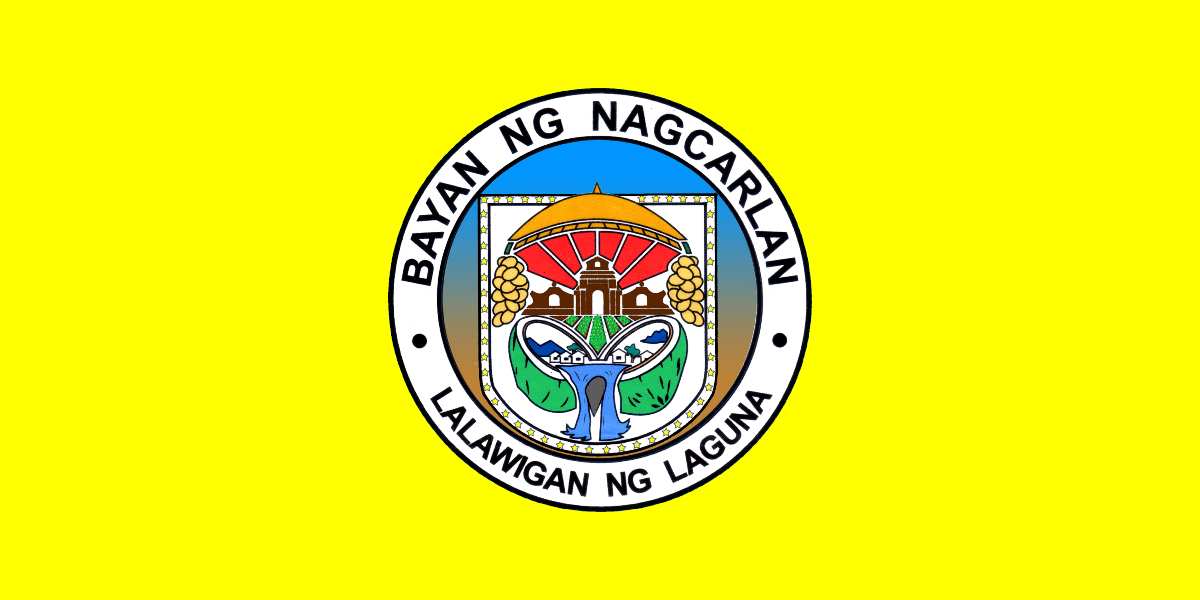
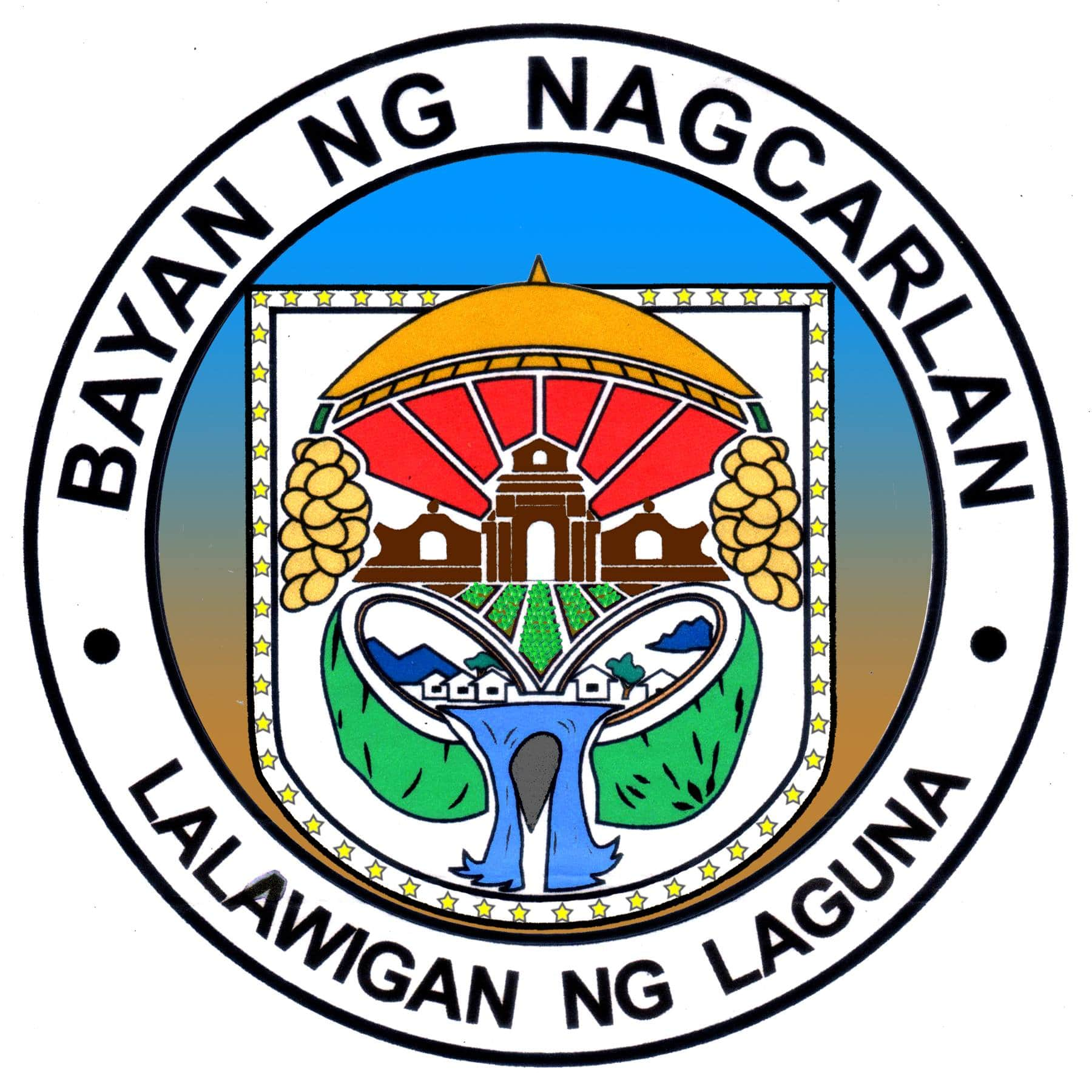
- Flag Seal
- Anthem: Martsa ng Nagcarlan
- Map of Laguna with Nagcarlan highlighted .
- Interactive map of Nagcarlan
- Location within the Philippines
- Coordinates: 14°08′11″N 121°24′59″E
- Country: Philippines
- Region: Calabarzon
- Province: Laguna
- District: 3rd district
- Founded: August 24, 1583
- Barangays: 52 (see Barangays)

Government
  - Type: Sangguniang Bayan
  - Mayor: Elmor V. Vita (Lakas)
  - Vice Mayor: Rexon V. Arevalo (Lakas)
  - Representative: Loreto Amante (PFP)
  - Municipal Council: Members: Laurence M. Sombilla; Ron-Erwin D. Esquivel; Lauro H. Dizon; Evelyn C. Sotoya; Christmas B. Osuna; Felipe S. Arcigal III; Alexander M. Donadio; Kemp A. Bueno
  - Electorate: 48,278 voters (2025)

Area
  - Total: 78.10 km^{2} (30.15 sq mi)
- Elevation: 333 m (1,093 ft)
- Highest elevation: 2,167 m (7,110 ft)
- Lowest elevation: 5 m (16 ft)

Population (2024 census)
  - Total: 66,351
  - Density: 849.6/km^{2} (2,200/sq mi)
  - Households: 16,796
- Demonym: Nagcarlangin

Economy
  - Income class: 1st municipal income class
  - Poverty incidence: 10.64% (2023)
  - Revenue: ₱ 260.4 million (2024)
  - Assets: ₱ 700.7 million (2024)
  - Expenditure: ₱ 128.5 million (2024)
  - Liabilities: ₱ 107.2 million (2024)

Service provider
  - Electricity: Manila Electric Company (Meralco)
- Time zone: UTC+8 (PST)
- ZIP code: 4002
- PSGC: 0403417000
- IDD : area code: +63 (0)49
- Native languages: Tagalog

Nagcarlan ([nɐgkɐɾˈlan]), officially the Municipality of Nagcarlan (Filipino: Bayan ng Nagcarlan), is a municipality in the province of Laguna, Philippines. According to the 2024 census, it has a population of 66,351 people.

== Etymology ==
According to legend, the name Nagcarlan is derived from Ana Kalang (later baptized as Ana Panalangin), an influential and respected tribal leader. She was known for carrying a golden salakot and a cane which she always carried when walking around town. She was well-respected by the townfolk not just for her wealth, but also for the help she extended to those in need. One account relates that a Spaniard visitor, while at her house, noticed branches outside swaying and striking one another and asked what was happening. Ana Kalang reportedly replied, “nagkakalang sila.” The phrase was subsequently misheard and mispronounced by the Spaniards, eventually evolving into the name Nagcarlan.

== History ==
=== Spanish colonial era ===
Before the Spanish conquest of the area, it was headed by Gat Lakilaw. Christianity was propagated to the area in 1578 through Fr. Juan de Plasencia and Fr. Diego Oropesa, both missionaries of the 1st Order of the Franciscans. The area became a formal town in 1583 under Fr. Tomas de Miranda, who brought and successfully cultivated in Nagcarlan the first wheat seeds ever on our country's soil. In 1595, Nagcarlan became an independent pueblo (town), separating itself from other towns which were formally established in 1583. The very first Gobernadorcillo was Gaspar Cahupa (Cajopa). The first stone church was built in 1752 by Fr. Cristobal Torres. While the town is already known as Nagcanlang even before the Spaniards came (as evidenced in the 1572 narrative of Juan Masolong, First Christian of Liliw, Laguna), it was Fr. Torres who allegedly named it Nagcarlan at that time in honor and recognize the contributions of the aforementioned influential and respected woman tribe leader named Ana Kalang (baptized as Ana Panalangin). The name Nagcarlan consistently appeared in the Spanish period records as the name of the town. In 1851, Fr. Vicente Velloc, a Franciscan Missionary built the Underground Cemetery, the first Catholic Cemetery with a crypt in the Philippines. According to Historical records, this is where the historic Biac-Na-Bato pact was planned by Pedro Paterno and General Severino Taino in 1897. It was also in Nagcarlan, where the Brain of the Katipunan, General Emilio Jacinto, coming from Majayjay and wounded, was captured.

== Geography ==
Nagcarlan is 52 kilometers (32 mi) from Santa Cruz and 97 kilometers (60 mi) from Manila.

=== Barangays ===
Nagcarlan is politically subdivided into 52 barangays, as indicated below. Each barangay consists of puroks and some have sitios

- Abo
- Alibungbungan
- Alumbrado
- Balayong
- Balimbing
- Balinacon
- Bambang
- Banago
- Banca-banca
- Bangcuro
- Banilad
- Bayaquitos
- Buboy
- Buenavista
- Buhanginan
- Bukal
- Bunga
- Cabuyew
- Calumpang
- Kanluran Kabubuhayan
- Silangan Kabubuhayan
- Labangan
- Lawaguin
- Kanluran Lazaan
- Silangan Lazaan
- Lagulo
- Maiit
- Malaya
- Malinao
- Manaol
- Maravilla
- Nagcalbang
- Poblacion I (Poblacion)
- Poblacion II (Poblacion)
- Poblacion III (Poblacion)
- Oples
- Palayan
- Palina
- Sabang
- San Francisco
- Sibulan
- Silangan Napapatid
- Silangan Ilaya
- Sinipian
- Santa Lucia
- Sulsuguin
- Talahib
- Talangan
- Taytay
- Tipacan
- Wakat
- Yukos

=== Climate ===
Climate data for Nagcarlan, Laguna
Month	Jan	Feb	Mar	Apr	May	Jun	Jul	Aug	Sep	Oct	Nov	Dec	Year
Mean daily maximum °C (°F)	26 (79)	27 (81)	29 (84)	31 (88)	30 (86)	29 (84)	28 (82)	28 (82)	28 (82)	28 (82)	27 (81)	26 (79)	28 (83)
Mean daily minimum °C (°F)	19 (66)	19 (66)	20 (68)	21 (70)	23 (73)	23 (73)	23 (73)	23 (73)	23 (73)	22 (72)	21 (70)	20 (68)	21 (70)
Average precipitation mm (inches)	52 (2.0)	35 (1.4)	27 (1.1)	27 (1.1)	82 (3.2)	124 (4.9)	163 (6.4)	144 (5.7)	145 (5.7)	141 (5.6)	100 (3.9)	102 (4.0)	1,142 (45)
Average rainy days	12.0	8.1	8.8	9.7	17.9	22.6	26.2	24.5	24.6	22.0	16.7	14.9	208
Source: Meteoblue

=== Distances ===
The closest city to Nagcarlan is San Pablo. Some of the neighboring municipalities are Liliw, Rizal, Calauan and Victoria.

== Demographics ==
Population census of Nagcarlan
Year	Pop.	±% p.a.
1903	10,212	—
1918	14,854	+2.53%
1939	14,762	−0.03%
1948	15,335	+0.42%
1960	18,227	+1.45%
1970	25,057	+3.23%
1975	27,493	+1.88%
1980	30,637	+2.19%
1990	37,696	+2.10%
1995	43,679	+2.80%
2000	48,727	+2.37%
2007	57,070	+2.20%
2010	59,726	+1.67%
2015	63,057	+1.04%
2020	64,866	+0.60%
2024	66,351	+0.54%
Source: Philippine Statistics Authority

In the 2024 census, the population of Nagcarlan was 66,351 people, with a density of 850 inhabitants per square kilometre or 2,200 inhabitants per square mile.

== Economy ==
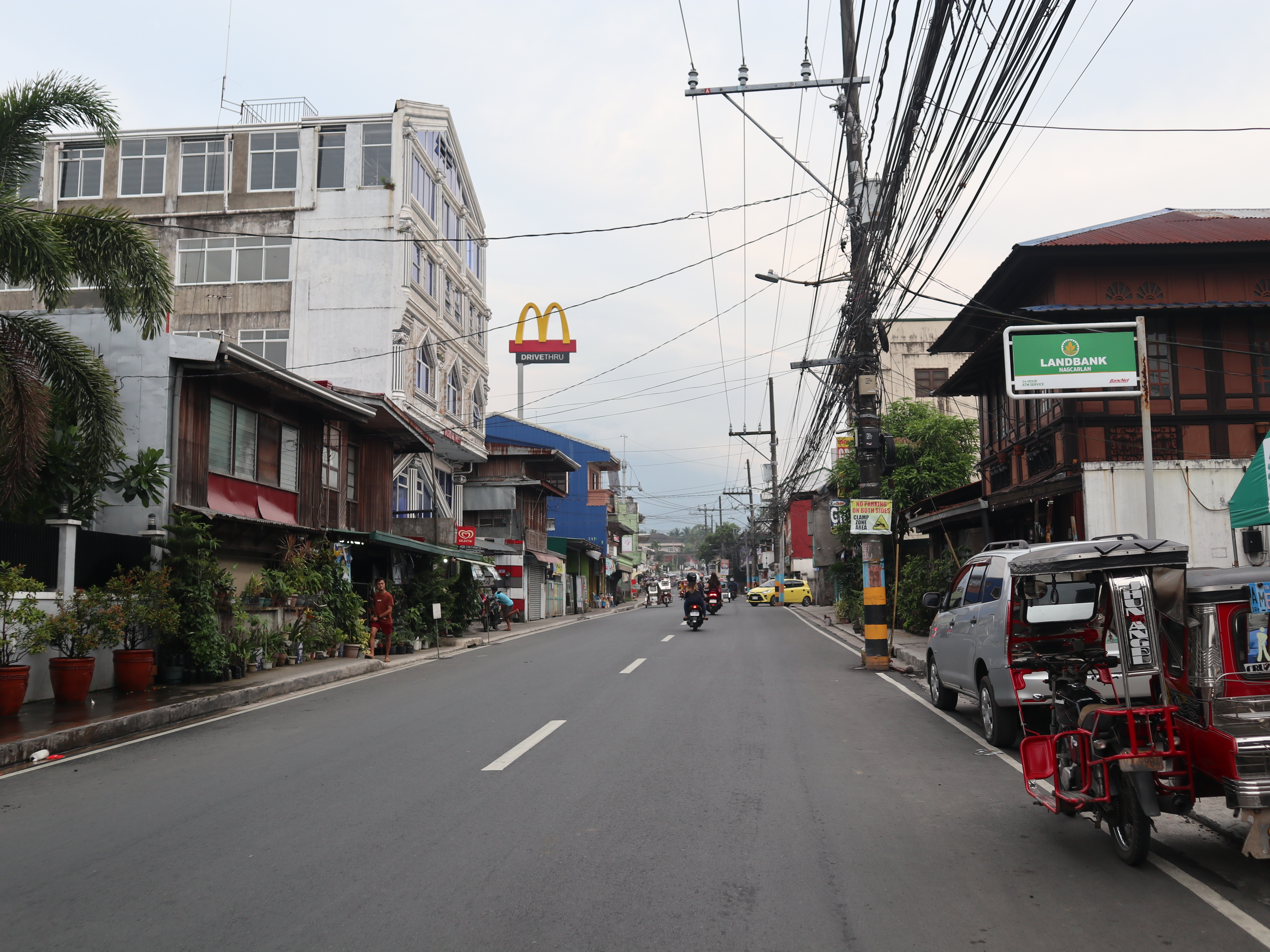
Nagcarlan poblacion

Poverty incidence of Nagcarlan (%)

Source: Philippine Statistics Authority

== Election ==
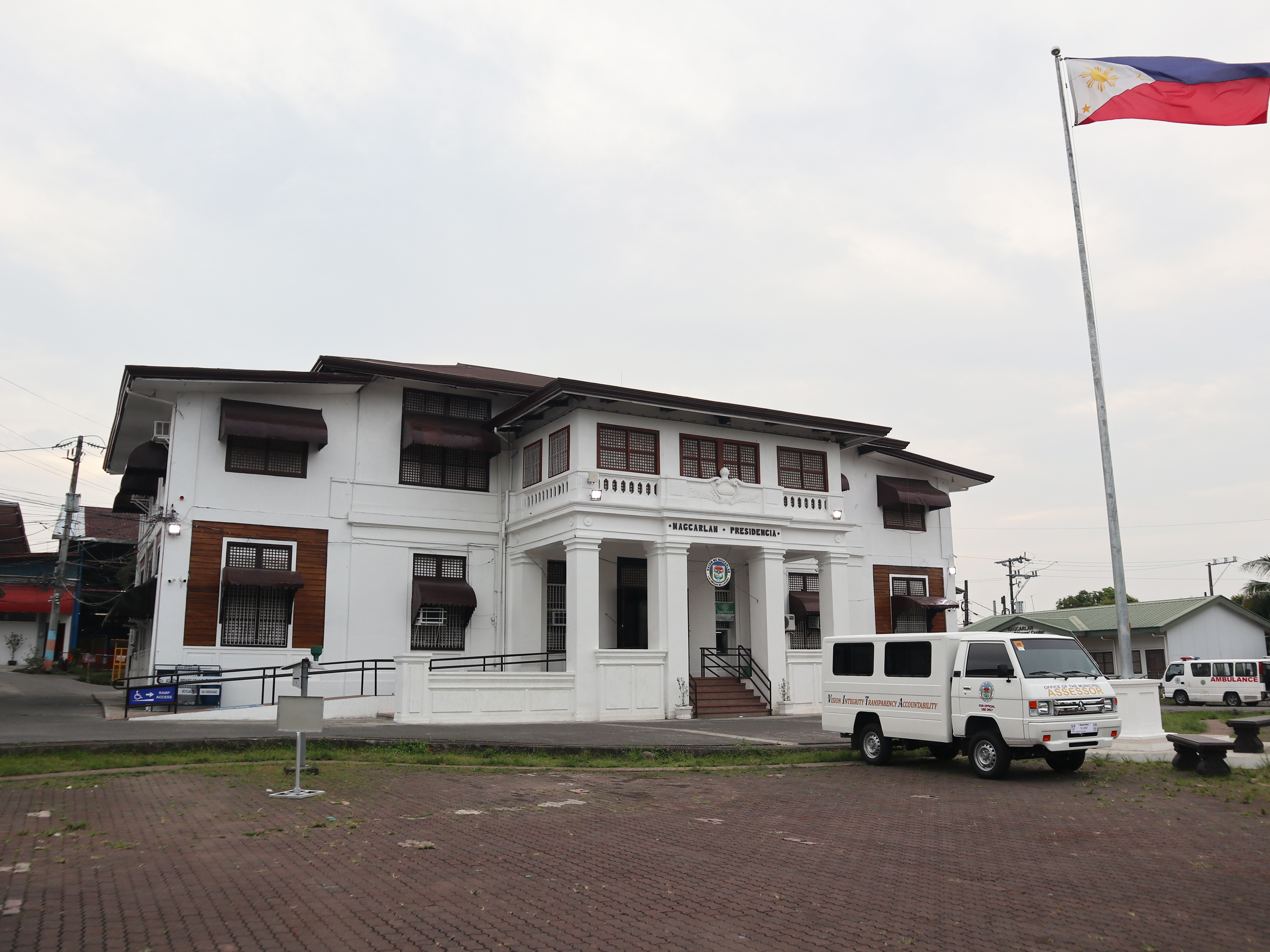
Nagcarlan Presidencia, the seat of the municipal government

=== 2022 ===
2022 Nagcarlan local election
Party	Candidates	Running Mate				Votes	%
Party	Candidates	Party	Candidate	Votes	%	Votes	%
Nacionalista	Elmor Vita	Aksyon	Rexon Arevalo (Incumbent)	25,357	68.64	21,974	57.78
PDP–Laban	Lourdes Arcasetas (Incumbent)	PDP–Laban	Evelyn Sotoya	11,587	31.36	16,055	42.22
Total votes				36,944	100.00	38,029	100.00
Winner : Nacionalista, Aksyon

=== 2019 ===
2019 Nagcarlan local election
Party	Candidates	Running Mate				Votes	%
Party	Candidates	Party	Candidates	Votes	%	Votes	%
Nacionalista	Lourdes "Ody" Arcasetas	Nacionalista	Felipe Arcigal III	12,041	38.53	17,781	54.78
PDP–Laban	Amie Malabag-Hernandez	PDP–Laban	Rexon Arevalo	13,171	42.14	10,897	33.58
		Independent	Cecille Plantilla	3,946	12.63		
Lakas–CMD	Manolo Cura	Lakas–CMD	Neri Monteza	2,094	6.70	3,777	11.64
Total votes				32,455	100.00	31,252	100.00
Winner : Nacionalista, PDP–Laban

== Tourism ==
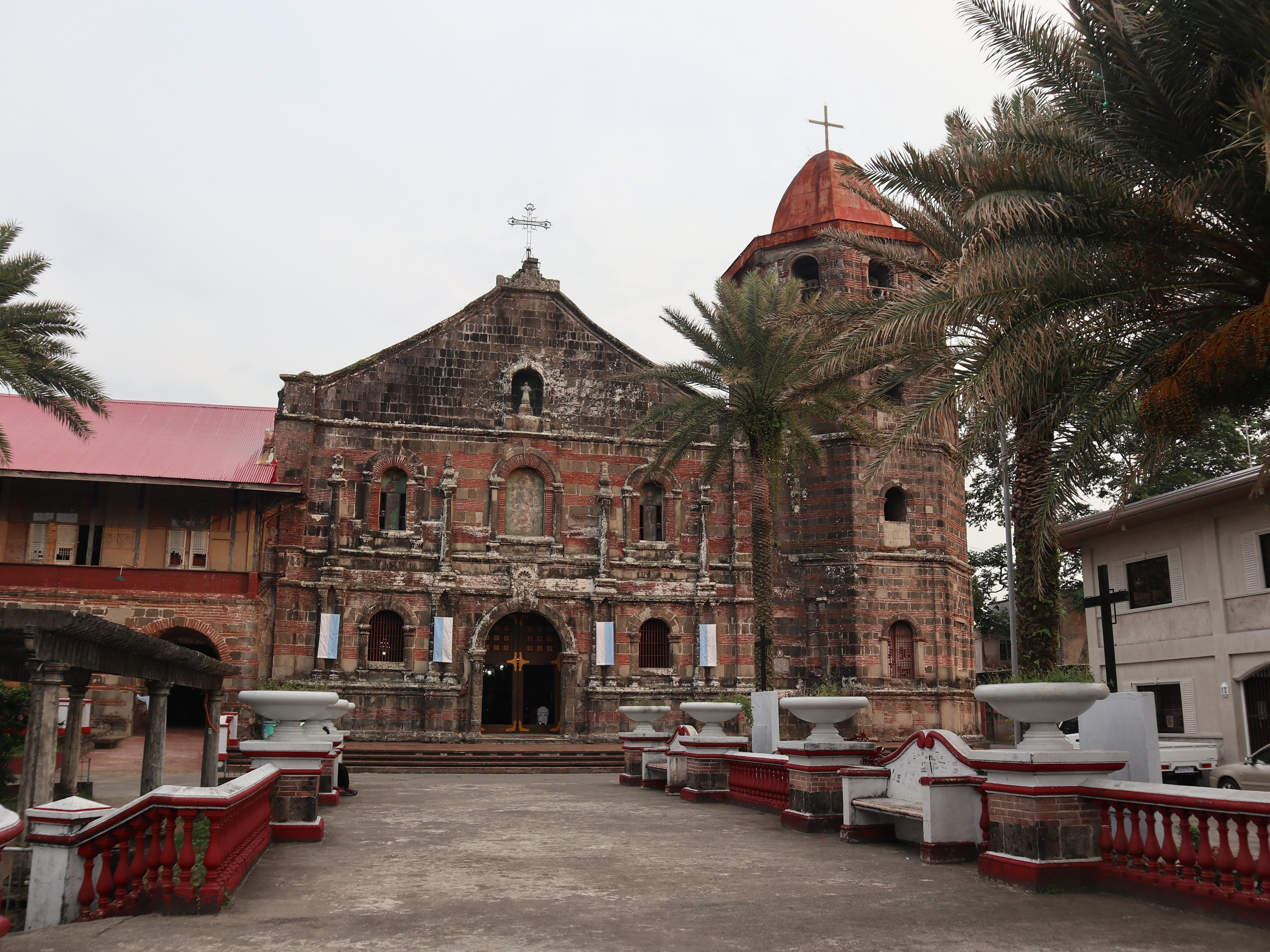
Spanish-era San Bartolome Apostol Parish Church

Along Rizal Avenue stands many heritage houses built during the 1920s to the 1930s. They are initeresting because they built with more than two floors on small plots of land.

The Bunga Falls is a favorite getaway among the locals along with the Yambo Lake which is accessible through the road going to Calauan.

Another interesting attraction is the San Bartolome Apostol Church. Located on an elevated ground overlooking the rest of the town, this 18th century church built by the Franciscans has a volcanic tuff stone and red clay facade with an four-storey belltower on the right and a convent on the left.

Nagcarlan's best known attraction is Nagcarlan Underground Cemetery, it contains 240 niches laying above ground and 36 niches underground. Members of the town's elite and clergy are buried underground below the funeral chapel.

== Education ==
The Nagcarlan-Rizal Schools District Office governs all educational institutions within the municipality. It oversees the management and operations of all private and public, from primary to secondary schools.

=== Primary and elementary schools ===
- Abo-Bukal Elementary School
- Alumbrado Elementary School
- Banilad Elementary School
- Banka-Banka Elementary School
- Barnabas Christian School
- Bunga Elementary School
- Crisanto Guysayko Memorial Elementary School
- Kabubuhayan Elementary School
- Labangan Elementary School
- Lazaan-Malinao Elementary School
- Manaol Elementary School
- Nagcarlan Adventist Elementary School
- Nagcarlan Montessori Center Inc.
- Plaridel Elementary School
- San Francisco Elementary School
- Santa Lucia Elementary School
- Silangan Napapatid Elementary School
- Sinipian Elementary School
- St. Mary's Academy of Nagcarlan
- Rizal Standard Academy
- Talangan Elementary School
- Taytay-Malaya Elementary School
- Wakat Elementary School
- Yukos Elementary School
- Yukos Elementary School (Annex)

=== Secondary schools ===
- Calumpang National High School
- Lowland Integrated National High School
- Nagcarlan Senior High School
- Plaridel Integrated National High School
- Rizal Standard Academy
- St. Mary's Academy of Nagcarlan
- Talangan National High School
- Upland Integrated National High School

== Notable personalities ==
- Efren V. Esmilla – Auxiliary Bishop of the Archdiocese of Philadelphia
- Esteban Baldivia – actor and comedian
- Alice Doria-Gamilla – composer
- Jak Roberto – actor, model and singer
