= Asia Pacific College =

Private college in Makati, Philippines

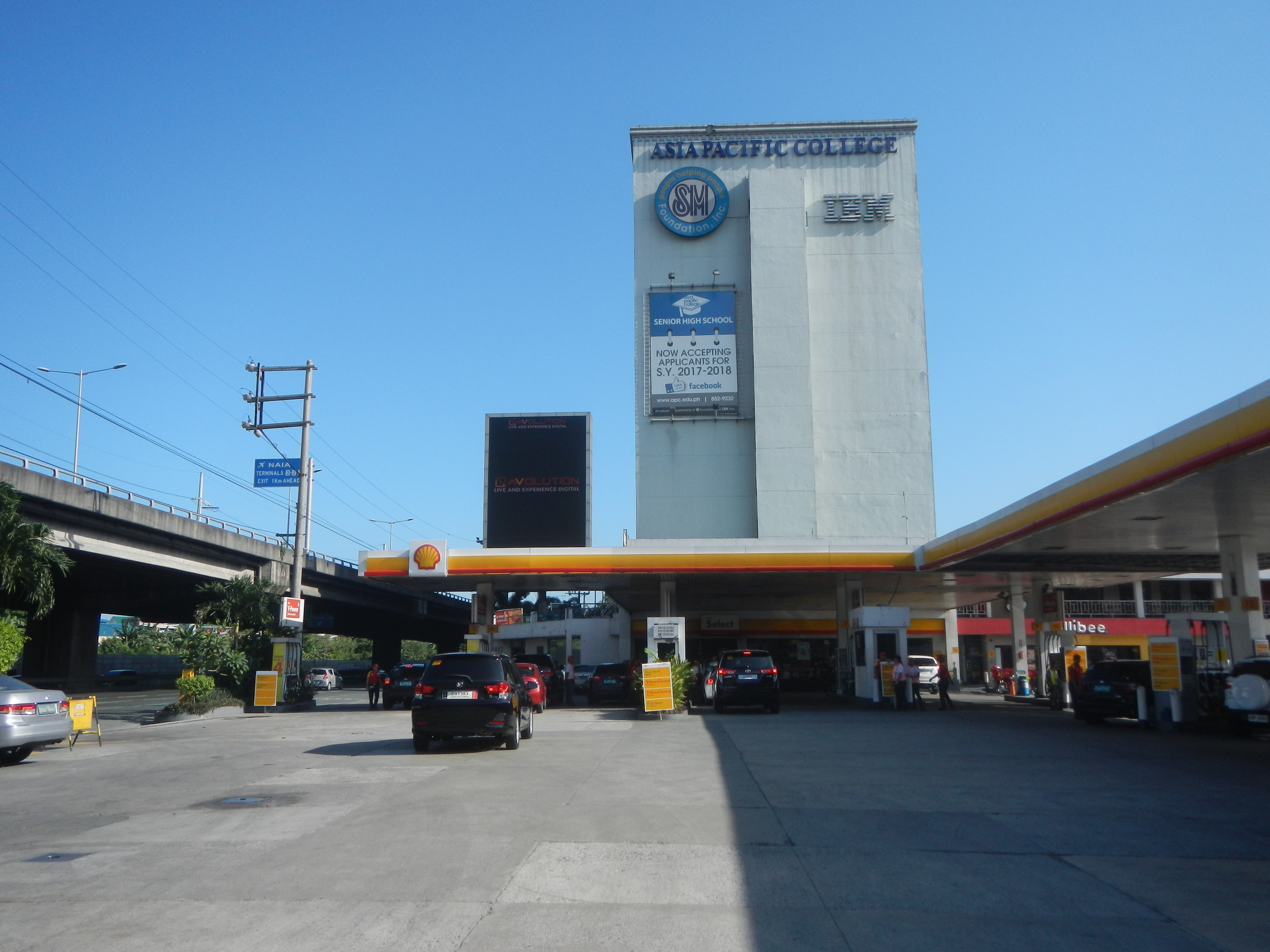
- Asia Pacific College campus building in 2017
- Motto: Industry Integrity Innovation
- Type: Private
- Established: 1991
- President: Maria Teresita Medado
- Administrative staff: 200
- Undergraduates: 2300
- Location: 3 Humabon St. Magallanes, Makati, Metro Manila, Philippines; 14°31′52″N 121°01′17″E
- Campus: 12-storey building
- School hymn: The APC Hymn
- Nickname: APC Ram
- Website: www.apc.edu.ph

- Location in Metro Manila Location in Luzon Location in the Philippines

Asia Pacific College (APC) is a private tertiary education institution in Makati, Metro Manila, Philippines. It was established in 1991 as a non-profit joint venture between IBM Philippines and the SM Foundation. Its program is focused on information technology in consortium with the National University.

== Programs ==
The Commission on Higher Education certifies the college as one of the four Centers of Excellence in IT Education in the Philippines.

== Internship program ==
The Industry-Academe Cooperative Education Program, also known as the I-ACE Program, is an internship program of the Asia Pacific College, in which students on their senior year are assigned to work full-time for a company for a period of two consecutive terms.

During the internship program, the interns are not expected to enroll in any academic courses in school for they will be working full-time (eight hours a day, Mondays to Fridays) at their companies. Interns are invited to attend monthly Saturday sessions with the Career & Placement Office to discuss updates, issues or problems encountered.
