= Efren V. Esmilla =

Filipino priest

His Excellency, The Most Reverend Efren Veridiano Esmilla
- Auxiliary Bishop of Philadelphia; Titular Bishop of Ottana
- Archdiocese: Philadelphia
- Appointed: December 8, 2023
- Installed: March 7, 2024
- Other post: Titular Bishop of Ottana

Orders
- Ordination: May 15, 1993 by Anthony Bevilacqua
- Consecration: March 7, 2024 by Nelson J. Pérez, John J. McIntyre, and Michael Francis Burbidge

Personal details
- Born: June 18, 1962 (age 63) Nagcarlan, Laguna, Philippines
- Education: San Beda College; Saint Charles Borromeo Seminary
- Motto: Sicut qui ministrat (As He who ministers)

Styles of Efren Veridiano Esmilla
- Reference style: His Excellency; The Most Reverend
- Spoken style: Your Excellency
- Religious style: Bishop

Efren Veridiano Esmilla (born June 18, 1962) is a Filipino-born prelate of the Catholic Church who has been serving as an auxiliary bishop for the Archdiocese of Philadelphia in Pennsylvania since 2023.

== Biography ==
=== Early life ===
Efren Esmilla was born on June 18, 1962, to Cristobal and Crispina Esmilla in Nagcarlan, Laguna, Philippines. In 1984, he earned a Bachelor of Science degree from San Beda College in Manila, Philippines.

After coming to the United States, Esmilla enrolled at Saint Charles Borromeo Seminary in Wynnewood, Pennsylvania. He received a Master of Divinity degree from Saint Charles in 1992.

=== Priesthood ===
On May 15, 1993, Esmilla was ordained to the priesthood at the Cathedral Basilica of Saints Peter and Paul for the Archdiocese of Philadelphia by Cardinal Anthony Bevilacqua. After his 1993 ordination, Esmilla served as parochial vicar of the following parishes in Pennsylvania:

- Saint John Chrysostom Parish in Wallingford (1993 to 2001)
- Maternity B.V.M. (Blessed Virgin Mary) Parish in Philadelphia (2001 to 2003)

Emilla left Maternity B.V.M in 2003 after being appointed to the faculty and as assistant director of pastoral and apostolic formation of Saint John Borromeo. In 2005, he left the seminary positions to become parochial vicar of Saint Martha Parish in Philadelphia. The next year, Esmilla became pastor of Our Lady of Hope Parish in the same city, a posting he would hold for the next 14 years. In 2020, the archdiocese transferred him to Saint James Parish in Elkins Park, Pennsylvania, to serve as pastor there.

=== Auxiliary Bishop of Philadelphia ===
Pope Francis appointed Esmilla as an auxiliary bishop of Philadelphia on December 8, 2023. On March 7, 2024, Esmilla was ordained a bishop by Archbishop Nelson J. Pérez at the Cathedral Basilica of Saints Peter and Paul, with Auxiliary Bishop John J. McIntyre and Bishop Michael Burbidge serving as co-consecrators.

== See also ==
- Catholic Church hierarchy
- Catholic Church in the United States
- Historical list of the Catholic bishops of the United States
- List of Catholic bishops of the United States
- Lists of patriarchs, archbishops, and bishops

== Episcopal succession ==
Catholic Church titles
Preceded by -	Auxiliary Bishop of Philadelphia; 2024-Present	Succeeded by -
