= Nagcarlan Underground Cemetery =

Cemetery in Laguna, Philippines

- Libingan sa Ilalim ng Lupa ng Nagcarlan
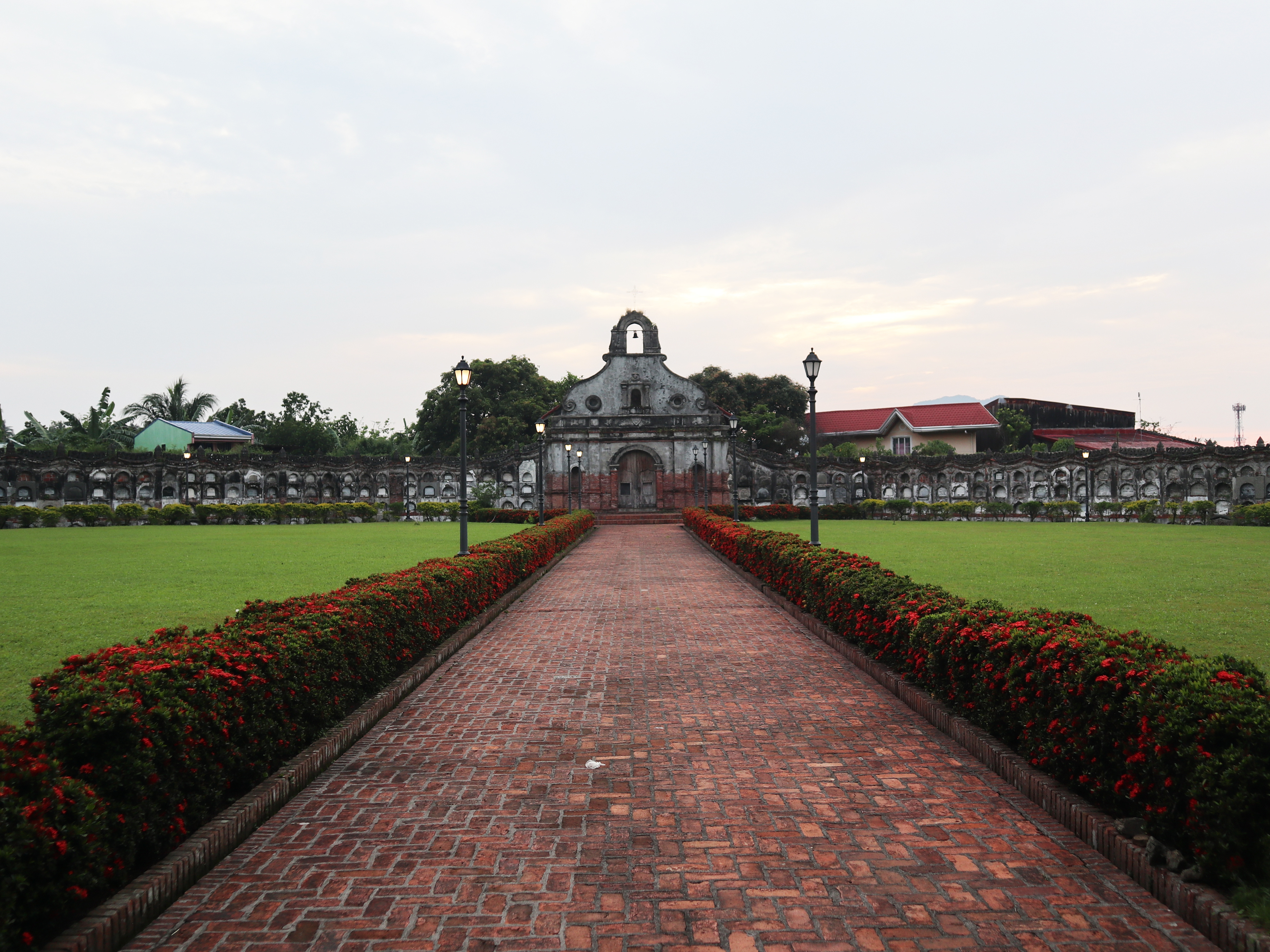
- Interactive map of Nagcarlan Underground Cemetery

Details
- Established: 1845
- Location: Brgy. Bambang, Nagcarlan, Laguna
- Country: Philippines
- Coordinates: 14°07′53″N 121°24′53″E
- Type: Roman Catholic
- Style: Baroque
- Owned by: Roman Catholic Diocese of San Pablo
- Size: 1 hectare
- No. of graves: 276 niches

The Nagcarlan Underground Cemetery (Filipino: Libingan sa Ilalim ng Lupa ng Nagcarlan) is a national historical landmark and museum in Barangay Bambang, Nagcarlan, Laguna supervised by the National Historical Commission of the Philippines. It was built in 1845 under the supervision of Franciscan priest, Fr. Vicente Velloc as a Catholic burial site and its underground crypt intended for Spanish Franciscan friars, prominent town citizens and members of elite Catholic families. It is dubbed as the only Catholic cemetery with a crypt in the country.

== History ==
=== Establishment of the Underground Cemetery ===
Fr. Vicente Velloc supervised the establishment of a Catholic cemetery in Nagcarlan in 1845 at the foothills of San Cristobal Volcano following 19th century regulations to prevent the widespread of infectious diseases such as cholera. Fr. Velloc decided to build it in the south away from the town's center. The cemetery was planned to serve as a Catholic resting place for the people of the town while the crypt below the chapel of the cemetery will only house remains of Spanish friars and prominent people. It was built together with the construction of the expanded St. Bartholomew Parish Church and rectory. The cemetery is built with a chapel where funeral masses were held and directly below it is a crypt.

=== As a Meeting Place during the Revolution ===
During the Philippine Revolution, the cemetery served as a meeting place of revolutionary leaders of the Katipunan in 1896. Pedro Paterno and Gen. Severino Taiño of the "Maluningning" command held a meeting at the cemetery where they planned the historic Pact of Biak-na-Bato in 1897. It also served as hideout for Filipino leaders during the Philippine–American War and of guerillas in World War II.

=== Declaration as a Historical Landmark ===
The Nagcarlan Underground Cemetery was formally and officially declared as a National Historical Landmark in 1981 by virtue of Presidential Decree no. 260, enacted August 1, 1973 with amendments by Administrative Order 1505, dated June 11, 1978. Since the declaration, new burials are no longer allowed in the cemetery. It underwent restoration before it was again opened to the public during the unveiling of the marker on October 24, 1981. The oldest tomb is dated 1886 while the last interment was in 1981 before it was formally declared as a National Historical Landmark.

== Features ==
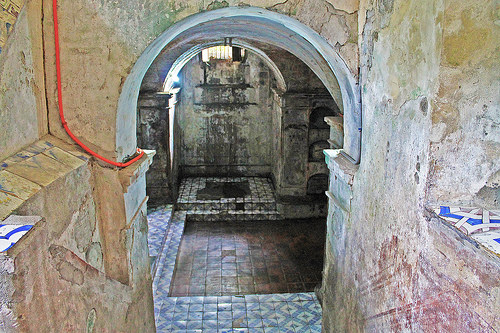
Stairway leading to the crypt

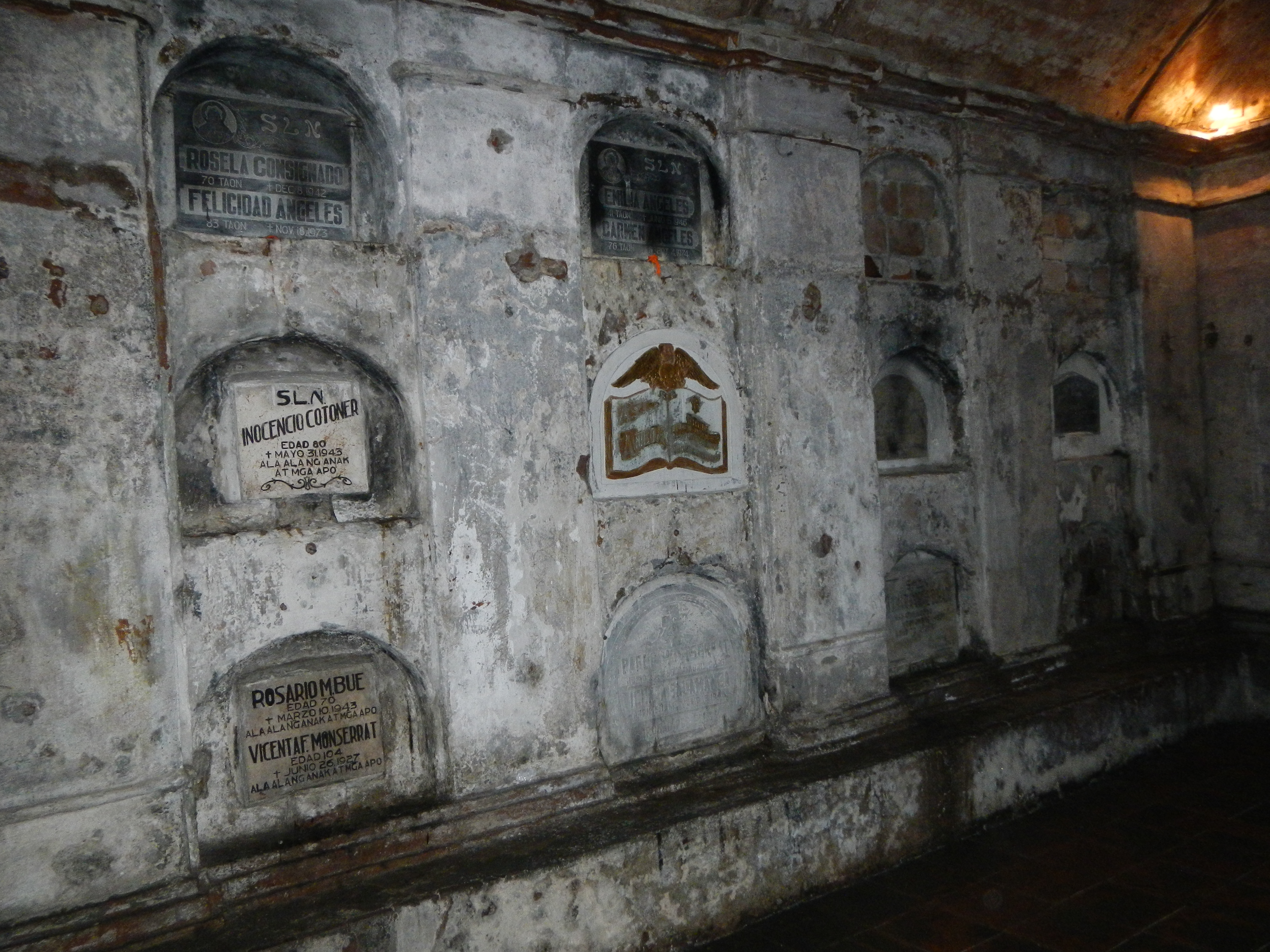
The niches in the crypt

The Baroque cemetery is located two kilometers south of downtown Nagcarlan that takes the shape of a circular cemetery across a 1 hectare property. It is surrounded by octagonal stone walls made of red clay bricks with wrought iron grills. A gateway arch of about 18 feet high with a wrought iron grill gate open to red brick pathways across two grass lawns leading to the cemetery chapel and the wall tombs. The chapel containing a neoclassical altar and retablo that enshrines the statue of the Entombed Christ serves as a place for the requiem or funeral mass. Located 15 feet below the chapel is the crypt consisting of an altar, retablo,and 36 tombs arranged in four walls The crypt and chapel is connected by two flight of steps. The first nine steps lead to a Spanish inscription on top of an archway that in English, reads:

Go forth, Mortal man, full of life
Today you visit happily this shelter,
But after you have gone out,
Remember, you have a resting place here,
Prepared for you.

The last six steps lead to the underground crypt.

The cemetery has 240 apartment-type niches on the walls beside of the chapel containing 120 niches each. Overall, there are 276 niches.

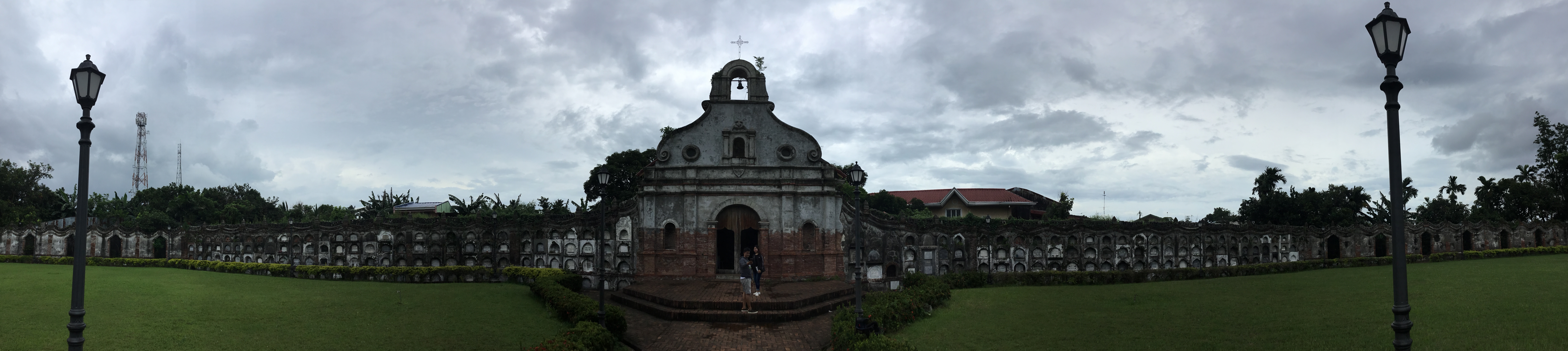
Grounds of the cemetery.

== Management ==
The cemetery complex remains as a property of the Roman Catholic Diocese of San Pablo. It is supervised and managed by the National Historical Commission of the Philippines. Currently, new burials are not allowed inside the cemetery. The complex is used for special celebrations such as the Feast of Christ the King and Lent of the local parish and the diocese.
