= Vice Governor of Laguna =

Presiding officer of the legislature of Laguna, Philippines

- Pangalawang Gobernador ng Lalawigan ng Laguna
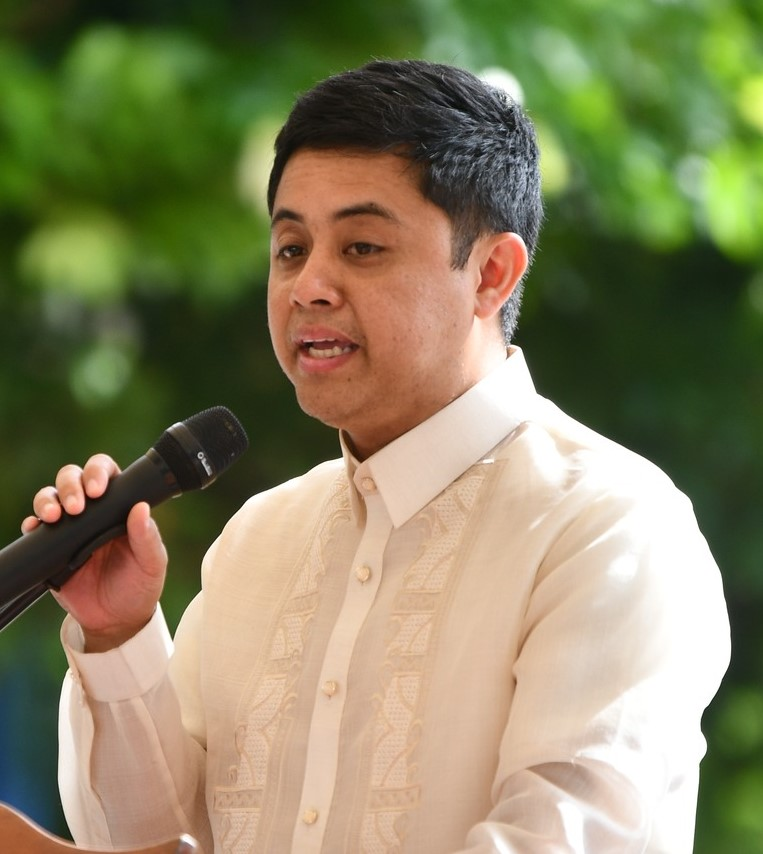
- Incumbent; Magtangol Jose Carait III since 30 June 2025 (Lakas)
- Style: Ms. (Mr.) Vice Governor, Your Honor, Honorable
- Seat: Laguna Provincial Capitol
- Appointer: Elected via popular vote
- Term length: 3 years, not eligible for re-election immediately after three consecutive terms
- Inaugural holder: Ruben De Roma (December 30, 1959)
- Formation: June 19, 1959; December 30, 1959

The Vice Governor of Laguna (Filipino: Pangalawang Punong Lalawigan ng Laguna) is the presiding officer of the Sangguniang Panlalawigan, the legislature of the provincial government of Laguna, Philippines.

The current vice governor is JM Carait, in office since June 30, 2025.

== List of officeholder ==
| No. | Portrait | Vice Governor (Lifespan) | Party | Term of office | | | Election |
| No. | Portrait | Vice Governor (Lifespan) | Party | start | end | duration | Election |
|---|---|---|---|---|---|---|---|
| 1 | | Ruben de Roma (1920–2005) | Liberal | 30 December 1959 | 30 December 1967 | 8 years, 0 days | 1959 |
| 1 | | Ruben de Roma (1920–2005) | Liberal | 30 December 1959 | 30 December 1967 | 8 years, 0 days | 1963 |
| 2 | | William Dichoso (1933–2021) | Liberal | 30 December 1967 | 30 January 1980 | 12 years, 31 days | 1967 |
| 2 | | William Dichoso (1933–2021) | Liberal | 30 December 1967 | 30 January 1980 | 12 years, 31 days | 1971 |
| 2 | | William Dichoso (1933–2021) | KBL | 30 December 1967 | 30 January 1980 | 12 years, 31 days | 1971 |
| 3 | | Rodolfo Tingzon Sr. (1926–2023) | KBL | 30 January 1980 | 26 February 1986 | 6 years, 27 days | 1980 |
| 3 | | Rodolfo Tingzon Sr. (1926–2023) | SAMAHAN | 30 January 1980 | 26 February 1986 | 6 years, 27 days | 1980 |
| 3 | | Rodolfo Tingzon Sr. (1926–2023) | KBL | 30 January 1980 | 26 February 1986 | 6 years, 27 days | 1980 |
Vacant (26–27 February 1986)
| 4 | | Leandro Balquiedra (1922–2001) | KBL | 27 February 1986 | 24 March 1986 | 25 days | — |
Vacant (24–25 March 1986)
| 5 | | Joaquin Chipeco Jr. (born 1942) | Independent | 25 March 1986 | 24 March 1987 | 364 days | — |
| 5 | | Joaquin Chipeco Jr. (born 1942) | UNIDO | 25 March 1986 | 24 March 1987 | 364 days | — |
| 5 | | Joaquin Chipeco Jr. (born 1942) | Liberal | 25 March 1986 | 24 March 1987 | 364 days | — |
| 6 | | Restituto Luna (1925–2002) | Liberal | 24 March 1987 | 18 December 1992 | 5 years, 269 days | — |
| 6 | | Restituto Luna (1925–2002) | Lakas (LnB) | 24 March 1987 | 18 December 1992 | 5 years, 269 days | 1988 |
| 6 | | Restituto Luna (1925–2002) | LDP | 24 March 1987 | 18 December 1992 | 5 years, 269 days | 1992 |
Vacant (18–21 December 1992)
| 7 | | Teresita Lazaro (born 1942) | NPC | 21 December 1992 | 26 January 2001 | 8 years, 36 days | — |
| 7 | | Teresita Lazaro (born 1942) | LDP | 21 December 1992 | 26 January 2001 | 8 years, 36 days | 1995 |
| 7 | | Teresita Lazaro (born 1942) | LAMMP | 21 December 1992 | 26 January 2001 | 8 years, 36 days | 1998 |
Vacant (26–29 January 2001)
| 8 | | Gat-Ala Alatiit (born 1958) | LAMMP | 29 January 2001 | 30 June 2001 | 152 days | — |
| 9 | | Danilo Ramon Fernandez (born 1966) | NPC | 30 June 2001 | 30 June 2004 | 3 years, 0 days | 2001 |
| 9 | | Danilo Ramon Fernandez (born 1966) | PDSP | 30 June 2001 | 30 June 2004 | 3 years, 0 days | 2001 |
| 10 | | Edwin Olivarez (born 1963) | Lakas–CMD | 30 June 2004 | 30 June 2007 | 3 years, 0 days | 2004 |
| 11 | | Ramil Hernandez (born 1972) | UNO | 30 June 2007 | 30 June 2010 | 3 years, 0 days | 2007 |
| 12 | | Caesar Perez (1954–2020) | Lakas–Kampi–CMD | 30 June 2010 | 30 June 2013 | 3 years, 0 days | 2010 |
| 13 | | Ramil Hernandez (born 1972) | Nacionalista | 30 June 2013 | 27 May 2014 | 331 days | 2013 |
Vacant (27–30 May 2014)
| 14 | | Katherine Agapay (born 1974) | Independent | 30 May 2014 | 30 June 2025 | 11 years, 31 days | — |
| 14 | | Katherine Agapay (born 1974) | Nacionalista | 30 May 2014 | 30 June 2025 | 11 years, 31 days | — |
| 14 | | Katherine Agapay (born 1974) | Nacionalista | 30 May 2014 | 30 June 2025 | 11 years, 31 days | 2016 |
| 14 | | Katherine Agapay (born 1974) | PDP–Laban | 30 May 2014 | 30 June 2025 | 11 years, 31 days | 2019 |
| 14 | | Katherine Agapay (born 1974) | PDP–Laban | 30 May 2014 | 30 June 2025 | 11 years, 31 days | 2022 |
| 14 | | Katherine Agapay (born 1974) | PFP | 30 May 2014 | 30 June 2025 | 11 years, 31 days | 2022 |
| 15 | | Magtangol Jose Carait III (born 1981) | Lakas–CMD | 30 June 2025 | Incumbent | 1 year, 70 days | 2025 |

== See also ==
- Governor of Laguna
- Laguna Provincial Board
- Sangguniang Panlalawigan
