= 2010 Laguna local elections =

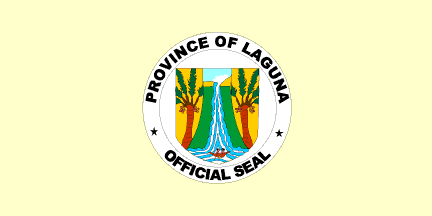
- May 10, 2010
- Gubernatorial election
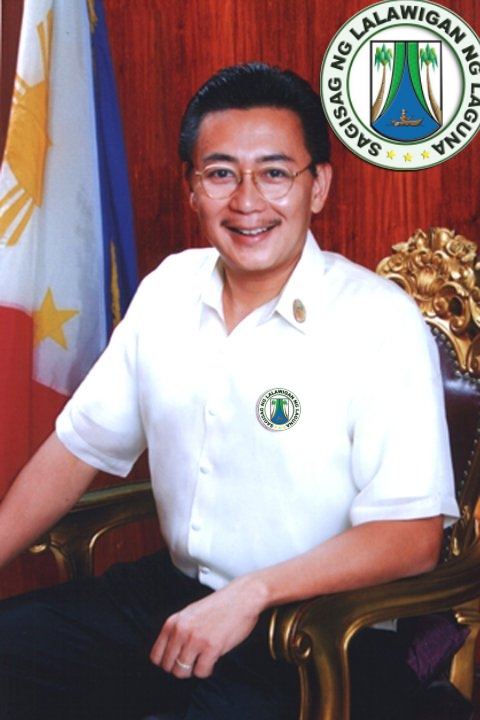
Nominee	E. R. Ejercito	Dennis Lazaro
Party	PMP	Lakas–Kampi
Running mate	Ellen Reyes	Caesar Perez
Popular vote	334,530	260,440
Percentage	34.88	27.16
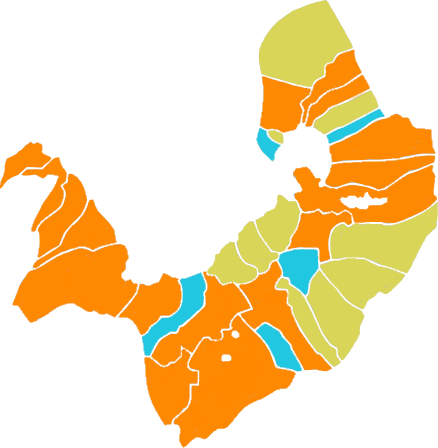
- Result of the Gubernatorial election by Cities/Municipalities
- Vice gubernatorial election
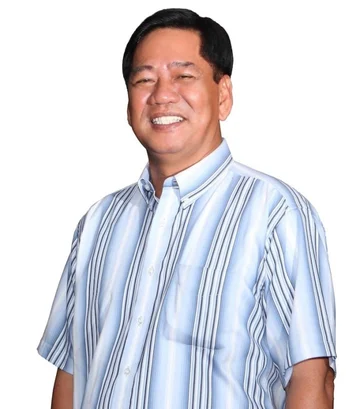
Nominee	Caesar Perez	Dave Almarinez
Party	Lakas–Kampi	Nacionalista
Popular vote	253,818	201,040
Percentage	29.05	23.01
Governor before election
Teresita S. Lazaro
Lakas–Kampi
Elected Governor
E. R. Ejercito
PMP

Local elections were held in the province of Laguna on May 10, 2010 as part of the 2010 general election. Voters selected candidates for all local positions: a municipal/city mayor, vice mayor and town councilors, as well as members of the Sangguniang Panlalawigan, the vice-governor, governor and representatives for the four districts of Laguna.

== Candidates ==
Lakas-CMD/Team Lazaro-Perez
Name	Party	Result
For Governor
Dennis Lazaro	Lakas	Lost
For Vice Governor
Caesar Perez	Lakas	Won
1st District
For House Of Representative
Dan Fernandez	Lakas	Won
For Board Member
Carlo Almoro	Lakas	Won
Monching Carillo	Lakas	Lost
Emil Tiongco	Lakas	Won
2nd District
For Board Member
Guillermo Bellarmino, Jr.	Lakas	Lost
Neil Nicon	Lakas	Won
Juan Unico	Lakas	Won
3rd District
For Board Member
Giovanni Dumaraos	Lakas	Lost
Rey Paras	Lakas	Won
4th District
For Board Member
Benidicto Palacol	Lakas	Won

Nacionalista Party/Team Hernandez-Almarinez
Name	Party	Result
For Governor
Ramil Hernandez	Nacionalista	Lost
For Vice Governor
Dave Almarinez	Nacionalista	Lost
1st District
For Board Member
Cesar Areza	Nacionalista	Lost
Bong Carait	Nacionalista	Lost
2nd District
For House Of Representative
Timmy Chipeco	Nacionalista	Won
For Board Member
Neptali Bagnes	Nacionalista	Won
Sonny Tapia	Nacionalista	Lost
3rd District
For Board Member
Angelica Jones-Alarva	Nacionalista	Won

Pwersa ng Masang Pilipino
Name	Party	Result
For Governor
E.R Ejercito	PMP	Won
For Vice Governor
Ellen Reyes	PMP	Lost
1st District
For Board Member
Bert Andal	PMP	Lost
2nd District
For Board Member
Delfin Ebron, Jr.	PMP	Lost
Edgar Llarena	PMP	Lost
Greg Manuel	PMP	Lost
3rd District
For House Of Representative
Florante Aquino	PMP	Lost
4th District
For Board Member
Gener Dimaranan	PMP	Lost
Baby Lizo	PMP	Lost

Liberal Party
Name	Party	Result
For Governor
Joey Lina	Liberal	Lost
For Vice Governor
Soy Mercado	Liberal	Lost
1st District
For Board Member
Gab Alatiit	Liberal	Won
Marlon Acierto	Liberal	Lost
2nd District
For Board Member
Jose Aguilo	Liberal	Lost
Hermogones Miranda	Liberal	Lost
3rd District
For House Of Representative
Maria Evita Arago	Liberal	Won
For Board Member
Herbert Ticzon	Liberal	Lost
4th District
For Board Member
Benjo Agarao	Liberal	Won
Lani Fernandez-Macalalag	Liberal	Lost

== Results ==
=== Partial Unofficial results from COMELEC ===
Partial Unofficial Tally as of 2010-05-12 11:06:11 88.60% of Election Returns

==== Provincial & Congressional Elections ====
Incumbent Teresita S. Lazaro is on her third consecutive term and was term-limited. Her son, Provincial Administrator Dennis Lazaro, ran in her place. He faced then-Pagsanjan Mayor E.R. Ejercito, former Governor Joey Lina, Incumbent Vice Governor Ramil Hernandez, and independent candidates Christine Amador and Randy Bautista.

- Laguna Gubernatorial election
  Party	Candidate	Votes	%
  PMP	Emilio Ramon Ejercito	334,530	34.88
  Lakas–Kampi	Dennis Lazaro	260,440	27.16
  Liberal	Jose Lina, Jr.	234,473	24.45
  Nacionalista	Ramil Hernandez	123,670	12.89
  Independent	Christine Amador	3,634	0.38
  Independent	Randy Bautista	2,311	0.24
  Total votes		1,050,890	100.00
  PMP gain from Lakas–Kampi			

Ramil Hernandez (Nacionalista) was the incumbent. Although eligible to run for his second consecutive term, he voluntarily retired to run for governor. His party nominated 1st District Board Member Dave Almarinez to run for vice governor. He faced then-Los Baños Mayor Caesar Perez, Celso Mercado, San Pablo City Councilor Eleanor Reyes, former Pagsanjan Mayor Abner Afuang, and Bernardita Cruz.

- Laguna Vice-gubernatorial election
  Party	Candidate	Votes	%
  Lakas–Kampi	Caesar Perez	253,818	29.05
  Nacionalista	Dave Almarinez	201,040	23.01
  Liberal	Celso Mercado	179,878	20.59
  PMP	Eleanor Reyes	156,623	17.93
  Independent	Abner Afuang	67,881	7.77
  Independent	Bernardita Cruz	14,372	1.65
  Lakas–Kampi gain from Nacionalista			

=== Congressional elections ===
Each of Laguna's four legislative districts elected a representative to the House of Representatives. The candidate with the highest number of votes wins the seat.

=== 1st District ===
Danilo Fernandez was originally elected during the 2007 election, but the House Electoral Tribunal ruled that his residence in the district was not enough and was disqualified; no replacement was named. Fernandez is running again for the district's seat this year.

Philippine House of Representatives election at Laguna's 1st district
Party	Candidate	Votes	%
Lakas–Kampi	Danilo Fernandez	219,439	75.89
NPC	Uliran Joaquin	69,715	24.11
Valid ballots		289,154	94.82
Invalid or blank votes		15,783	5.18
Total votes		304,937	100.00
Lakas–Kampi hold			

=== 2nd District ===
Justin Marc Chipeco is the incumbent.

Philippine House of Representatives election at Laguna's 2nd district
Party	Candidate	Votes	%
Nacionalista	Justin Marc Chipeco	204,926	75.72
Independent	Severino Vergara	57,049	21.08
Independent	Rosauro Revilla	8,672	3.20
Valid ballots		270,647	90.06
Invalid or blank votes		29,867	9.94
Total votes		300,514	100.00
Nacionalista hold			

=== 3rd District ===
Maria Evita Arago is the incumbent. Her opponents are incumbent 3rd district board Katherine Agapay and former San Pablo mayor Florante Aquino.

Philippine House of Representatives election at Laguna's 3rd district
Party	Candidate	Votes	%
Liberal	Maria Evita Arago	123,638	61.64
NPC	Katherine Agapay	60,751	30.69
PMP	Florante Aquino	16,202	8.08
Valid ballots		200,591	94.85
Invalid or blank votes		10,895	5.15
Total votes		211,486	100.00
Liberal hold			

=== 4th District ===
Edgar San Luis is the incumbent and is running unopposed.

Philippine House of Representatives election at Laguna's 4th district
Party	Candidate	Votes	%
NPC	Edgar San Luis	181,930	100.00
Valid ballots		181,930	77.76
Invalid or blank votes		52,023	22.24
Total votes		233,953	100.00
NPC hold			

=== Sangguniang Panlalawigan elections ===
All four districts of Laguna elected Sangguniang Panlalawigan or provincial board members.

==== Summary ====
Party	Votes	%	Seats
Lakas Kampi CMD	727,283	36.65	6
Liberal Party	494,610	24.93	2
Nacionalista Party	457,986	23.08	2
Pwersa ng Masang Pilipino	82,792	4.17	0
Nationalist People's Coalition	82,753	4.17	0
Kilusang Bagong Lipunan	19,594	0.99	0
Independent	119,303	6.01	0
Ex officio seats			3
Total	1,984,321	100.00	13
Total votes	1,050,890	–	

==== 1st District ====
- Cities: Biñan, Santa Rosa
- Municipality: San Pedro
- Population (2007): 811,486

Parties are as stated in their certificate of candidacies.

Laguna 1st District Sangguniang Panlalawigan election
Party	Candidate	Votes	%
Lakas–Kampi	Carlo Almoro	133,741	19.66
Liberal	Gab Alatiit	98,594	14.49
Lakas–Kampi	Emilio Tiongco	94,868	13.94
Nacionalista	Cesar Areza	93,877	13.80
Lakas–Kampi	Ramon Carrillo	76,725	11.28
Liberal	Marlon Acierto	68,828	10.12
Nacionalista	Bong Carait	65,321	9.60
KBL	Gil Sotto	19,594	2.88
Independent	Rio Cañeda	14,887	2.19
PMP	Lamberto Andal	7,613	1.12
Independent	Edwin Panelo	6,257	0.92
Total votes		304,937	100.00

==== 2nd District ====
- Cities: Calamba
- Municipality: Bay, Cabuyao, Los Baños
- Population (2007): 715,044

Parties are as stated in their certificate of candidacies.

Laguna 2nd District Sangguniang Panlalawigan election
Party	Candidate	Votes	%
Nacionalista	Neptali Bagnes	113,617	17.70
Lakas–Kampi	Juan Unico	98,466	15.34
Lakas–Kampi	Neil Nocon	84,518	13.17
Lakas–Kampi	Guillermo Bellarmino, Jr.	76,170	11.87
Liberal	Jose Aguillo	74,994	11.68
Nacionalista	Susano Tapia	72,063	11.23
Liberal	Hermogenes Miranda	39,850	6.21
PMP	Edgar Llarena	20,302	3.16
Independent	Ronald Cardema	20,015	3.12
PMP	Delfin Ebron, Jr.	16,719	2.60
PMP	Gregorio Manuel	13,512	2.11
Independent	Armando Velasco	11,614	1.80
Total votes		300,514	100.00

==== 3rd District ====
- Cities: San Pablo
- Municipality: Alaminos, Calauan, Liliw, Nagcarlan, Rizal, Victoria
- Population (2007): 470,972

Parties are as stated in their certificate of candidacies.

Laguna 3rd District Sangguniang Panlalawigan election
Party	Candidate	Votes	%
Lakas–Kampi	Reynaldo Paras	70,952	22.22
Nacionalista	Angelica Jones	68,305	21.40
NPC	Diosdado Biglete	44,803	14.03
Liberal	Herbert Ticzon	42,963	13.46
Independent	Michael Potenciano	31,149	9.76
Independent	Mirabo Bueser	26,305	8.24
NPC	William Duldulao	22,546	7.06
Independent	Rommel Maghirang	7,573	2.37
Lakas–Kampi	Giovanni Dumaraos	4,653	1.46
Total votes		211,486	100.00

==== 4th District ====
- City: None
- Municipalities: Cavinti, Famy, Kalayaan, Luisiana, Lumban, Mabitac, Magdalena, Majayjay, Paete, Pagsanjan, Pakil, Pangil, Pila, Santa Cruz, Santa Maria, Siniloan
- Population (2007): 476,029

Parties are as stated in their certificate of candidacies.

Laguna 4th District Sangguniang Panlalawigan election
Party	Candidate	Votes	%
Liberal	Benjo Agarao	107,940	31.48
Lakas–Kampi	Benedicto Palacol	87,190	25.43
Liberal	Lani Fernandez-Macalalag	61,441	17.92
NPC	Felix Flores	60,207	17.56
PMP	Baby Lizo	14,004	4.08
PMP	Gener Dimaranan	10,642	3.10
Independent	Danilo Alon	1,503	0.44
Total votes		233,953	100.00

== City and municipal elections ==
All municipalities of Laguna, Biñan, Calamba, San Pablo City, and Santa Rosa City will elect mayor and vice-mayor this election. The candidates for mayor and vice mayor with the highest number of votes wins the seat; they are voted separately, therefore, they may be of different parties when elected. Below is the list of mayoralty candidates of each city and municipalities per district.

=== 1st District ===
- Cities: Biñan, Santa Rosa
- Municipality: San Pedro

==== Biñan ====
Len Alonte is the incumbent, she is running unopposed.

Biñan mayoralty election
Party	Candidate	Votes	%
Liberal	Marlyn Alonte-Naguiat	70,363	100.00
Total votes		70,363	100.00
Liberal hold			

==== Santa Rosa City ====
Santa Rosa City mayoralty election
Party	Candidate	Votes	%
Lakas–Kampi	Arlene Arcillas-Nazareno	71,374	67.46
Independent	Joey Catindig	20,748	19.61
NPC	Romeo Aala	13,398	12.66
Independent	Arceli Paglomutan	173	0.16
Independent	Manolito Hermano	109	0.10
Total votes		105,802	100.00
Lakas–Kampi hold			

==== San Pedro ====
San Pedro mayoralty election
Party	Candidate	Votes	%
Nacionalista	Calixto Cataquiz	60,325	61.94
Lakas–Kampi	Felicismo Vierneza	29,725	30.52
PMP	Melchor Suitos, Jr.	7,336	7.53
Total votes		97,386	100.00

=== 2nd District ===
- Cities: Calamba
- Municipality: Bay, Cabuyao, Los Baños

==== Calamba ====
Calamba mayoralty election
Party	Candidate	Votes	%
Lakas–Kampi	Joaquin Chipeco Jr.	78,425	55.75
Liberal	Pursino Oruga	61,055	43.30
Independent	Wenceslao Malinao	1,204	0.86
Total votes		140,684	100.00

==== Cabuyao ====
Cabuyao mayoralty election
Party	Candidate	Votes	%
Nacionalista	Isidro Hemedes Jr.	35,772	43.37
Liberal	Nila Aguillo	29,861	36.20
Aksyon	Jaime Caringal	16,854	20.43
Total votes		82,487	100.00
Nacionalista hold			

==== Los Baños ====
Los Baños mayoralty election
Party	Candidate	Votes	%
Bigkis	Anthony Genuino	17,658	42.78
Nacionalista	Procopio Alipon	15,355	37.20
Liberal	Francisco Lapis	8,087	19.59
Independent	Christopher Rompe	97	0.23
Independent	Servillano Olleta	82	0.20
Total votes		41,279	100.00
Bigkis hold			

=== 3rd District ===
- Cities: San Pablo
- Municipality: Alaminos, Calauan, Liliw, Nagcarlan, Rizal, Victoria

==== San Pablo City ====
San Pablo City mayoralty election
Party	Candidate	Votes	%
Lakas–Kampi	Vicente Amante	62,248	65.36
NPC	Arcadio Gapangada, Jr.	16,102	16.91
Nacionalista	Arsenio Escudero, Jr.	15,924	12.03
Independent	Alfredo Cosico	961	1.01
Total votes		95,235	100.00

==== Alaminos ====
Alaminos mayoralty election
Party	Candidate	Votes	%
Lakas–Kampi	Eladio Magampon	7,736	38.78
Liberal	Ruben Alvarez	4,450	22.31
Nacionalista	Lorenzo Zuñiga	4,329	21.70
NPC	Samuel Bueser	3,435	17.22
Total votes		19,950	100.00

==== Calauan ====
Calauan mayoralty election
Party	Candidate	Votes	%
Independent	Felisa Berris	8,953	46.13
Liberal	June Joseph Brion	6,367	32.80
Aksyon	Guillermo Roxas	4,090	21.07
Total votes		19,410	100.00
Independent gain from Lakas–Kampi			

==== Liliw ====
Liliw mayoralty election
Party	Candidate	Votes	%
Lakas–Kampi	Cesar Sulibit	9,694	56.96
NPC	Eduardo Del Mundo	7,324	43.04
Total votes		17,018	100.00

==== Nagcarlan ====
Nagcarlan mayoralty election
Party	Candidate	Votes	%
NPC	Aurora Malabag	12,346	33.82
Lakas–Kampi	Nelson Osuna	9,192	33.82
Liberal	Rosendo Corales	5,574	20.51
Independent	Juanito Sumariba	66	0.24
Total votes		27,178	100.00

==== Rizal ====
Rizal mayoralty election
Party	Candidate	Votes	%
Lakas–Kampi	Antonino Aurelio	4,897	55.31
Bigkis	Rolen Urriquia	3,957	44.69
Total votes		8,854	100.00

==== Victoria ====
Victoria mayoralty election
Party	Candidate	Votes	%
Liberal	Raul Gonzales	9,962	56.20
Lakas–Kampi	Dwight Kampitan	7,764	43.80
Total votes		17,726	100.00
Liberal gain from Lakas–Kampi			

=== 4th District ===
- City: None
- Municipalities: Cavinti, Famy, Kalayaan, Luisiana, Lumban, Mabitac, Magdalena, Majayjay, Paete, Pagsanjan, Pakil, Pangil, Pila, Santa Cruz, Santa Maria, Siniloan

==== Cavinti ====
Cavinti mayoralty election
Party	Candidate	Votes	%
Independent	Florcelie Esguerra	6,344	
Liberal	Evelyn Bleza		
Total votes			

==== Famy ====
Famy mayoralty election
Party	Candidate	Votes	%
PMP	Renonia Murimatsu	3,374	
Lakas–Kampi	Emmanuel Acomular		
Liberal	Marcelina Regulacion		
Total votes			

==== Kalayaan ====
Kalayaan mayoralty election
Party	Candidate	Votes	%
Lakas–Kampi	Teodoro Adao	6,038	58.50
Liberal	Emmanuel Magana	4,200	40.69
Independent	Ponciano Pasco	83	0.80
Total votes		10,321	100.00

==== Luisiana ====
Luisiana mayoralty election
Party	Candidate	Votes	%
Lakas–Kampi	Manuel Rondilla	5,781	57.16
Liberal	Ness Rondilla	3,948	39.04
Independent	Cesar Megino	385	3.81
Total votes		10,114	100.00

Luisiana vice mayoralty election
Party	Candidate	Votes	%
Lakas–Kampi	Crisanto Villamin	5,454	56.75
Liberal	Eduardo Aldovino	4,156	43.25
Total votes		9,610	100.00

==== Lumban ====
Lumban mayoralty election
Party	Candidate	Votes	%
Lakas–Kampi	Wilfredo Paraiso	8,064	54.34
Nacionalista	Mario Ablao	5,599	37.73
PMP	Cayo Almario	1,176	7.93
Total votes		14,839	100.00

==== Mabitac ====
Mabitac mayoralty election
Party	Candidate	Votes	%
Lakas–Kampi	Gerardo Fader	5,320	60.71
Liberal	Jacqueline Carpio	3,409	38.90
KBL	Rizalino Cariaso	34	0.39
Total votes		8,763	100.00

==== Magdalena ====
Magdalena mayoralty election
Party	Candidate	Votes	%
Lakas–Kampi	Teresa Reodica	3,752	36.63
NPC	David Aventurado	3,586	35.01
Liberal	Pablo Agapay	2,906	28.37
Total votes		10,244	100.00

==== Majayjay ====
Majayjay mayoralty election
Party	Candidate	Votes	%
Liberal	Teofilo Guera	4,224	
PMP	Froilan Gruezo		
Nacionalista	Avelino Merestela		
Lakas–Kampi	Helen Rodillas		
Total votes			

==== Paete ====
Paete mayoralty election
Party	Candidate	Votes	%
Liberal	Emmanuel Cadayona	5,120	42.28
Lakas–Kampi	Florentino Velasco	4,208	22.97
Nacionalista	Elmoise Afurong	2,782	22.97
Total votes		12,110	100.00

==== Pagsanjan ====
Pagsanjan mayoralty election
Party	Candidate	Votes	%
PMP	Girlie Ejercito	9,702	57.39
NPC	Celso Rivera	3,861	22.84
Lakas–Kampi	Arlyn Lazaro-Torres	3,343	19.77
Total votes		16,906	100.00
PMP hold			

==== Pakil ====
Pakil mayoralty election
Party	Candidate	Votes	%
Lakas–Kampi	Vipops Charles Martinez	5,179	
Nacionalista	Dennis Baja		
Liberal	Ariel Fornoles		
Total votes			

==== Pangil ====
Pangil mayoralty election
Party	Candidate	Votes	%
Lakas–Kampi	Juanita Manzana	5,186	57.20
Aksyon	Valentin Sta. Ana	2,216	28.86
Nacionalista	Agapito Valera Jr.	1,158	12.77
Independent	Alfredo Acaylar	106	1.17
Total votes		8,666	100.00
Lakas–Kampi hold			

==== Pila ====
Pila mayoralty election
Party	Candidate	Votes	%
Lakas–Kampi	Edgardo Ramos	10,214	50.25
NPC	Elvira Quiat	7,054	34.70
PMP	Jose Rafael Antonio	2,966	14.59
Independent	Proceso Esguerra	93	0.46
Total votes		20,327	100.00

==== Santa Cruz ====
Incumbent Mayor Ariel Magcalas is running for reelection. He will face former congressman Benjamin Agarao and former mayor Domingo Panganiban.

Santa Cruz mayoralty election
Party	Candidate	Votes	%
PMP	Domingo Panganiban	15,908	37.92
Liberal	Benjamin Agarao Jr.	13,867	33.06
Lakas–Kampi	Ariel Magcalas	12,175	29.02
Total votes		41,950	100.00

==== Santa Maria ====
Santa Maria mayoralty election
Party	Candidate	Votes	%
Liberal	Antonio Carolino	7,688	54.19
Lakas–Kampi	Joel Cuento	6,500	45.81
Total votes		14,188	100.00

==== Siniloan ====
Siniloan mayoralty election
Party	Candidate	Votes	%
NPC	Juanita Acero	9,407	55.03
Lakas–Kampi	Paul Simon Go	7,649	44.75
Independent	Florentina Barba	37	0.22
Total votes		17,093	100.00
