= Katherine Agapay =

Filipino lawyer and politician (born 1974)

The Honorable Katherine Agapay
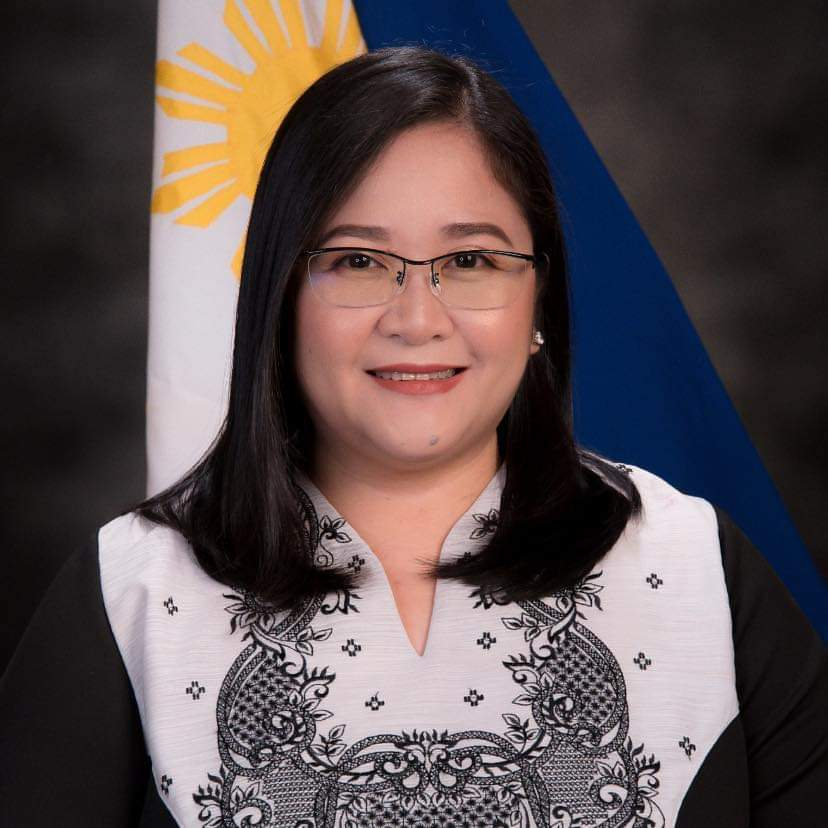
- Official portrait, 2019

14th Vice Governor of Laguna
- In office May 30, 2014 – June 30, 2025
- Governor: Ramil Hernandez
- Preceded by: Ramil Hernandez
- Succeeded by: JM Carait

Member of the Laguna Provincial Board from 3rd District
- In office June 30, 2013 – May 28, 2014
- In office June 30, 2007 – June 30, 2010

Member of the San Pablo City Council
- In office June 30, 2004 – June 30, 2007

Personal details
- Born: June 26, 1974 (age 52) San Pablo, Laguna, Philippines
- Party: PFP (2023–present)
- Other political affiliations: PDP–Laban (2018–2023); Nacionalista (2015–2018); Independent (2012–2015); NPC (2006–2012); Lakas–CMD (2003–2006)
- Education: University of the Philippines Diliman (BA); San Sebastian College – Recoletos (LLB)
- Occupation: Politician
- Profession: Lawyer

Katherine Cartabio Agapay (born June 26, 1974), also known as Karen Agapay, is a Filipino lawyer and politician who served as 14th Vice Governor of Laguna from May 30, 2014, to June 30, 2025, before she elevated to the position as Vice Governor she is serving as Senior Board Member of the Laguna Provincial Board from 3rd District from June 30, 2013, until May 28, 2014, her first term is from 2007 to 2010 she also served as City Councilor of San Pablo from 2004 to 2007.

== Early life and education ==
Agapay was born on June 26, 1974 in San Pablo, Laguna she was the eldest child of later 3rd District Board Member Nelson C. Agapay Sr. and later Auditor at the Commission on Audit Vicenta Cartabio-Agapay.

Agapay attended elementary in St. Joseph Elementary School until she graduated in 1980s and later start her high school in Laguna College and later she attended her college in University of the Philippines Diliman, where she finished the course of Political Science and later went to San Sebastian College – Recoletos and passed her bar exam in 2005.

Before she entered politics she was a Part-time college instructor of Business Law at the Laguna College.

== Political career ==
Agapay firstly served as Sanggunian Kabataan Federation President from 1993 until 1996 for only one term.

In 2004 elections, she ran as City Councilor in San Pablo, Laguna and won being 7th place and served from June 30, 2004, until June 30, 2007.

In 2007 elections, she ran as Provincial Board Member in 3rd District under the party of NPC and won being in the first place.

In 2010 elections, she ran as Representative of the 3rd District of Laguna under the party of NPC but was defeated by incumbent congresswoman Ma. Evita Arago who won landslide votes.

In 2013 elections, she ran again as Provincial Board Member as an independent and won via landslide vote and served from June 30, 2013, until May 28, 2014, before she elevated as Vice Governor of Laguna on May 30, 2014.

In 2016 elections, she ran as Vice Governor of Laguna for her fist full term under the Nacionalista Party and leter won deating Christian Niño Lajara of UNA and actress and comedian Angelica Alarva of Liberal.

In 2019 elections, she ran again for her second term as Vice Governor of Laguna under the PDP–Laban and won 930,387 votes or landslide votes defeating Mateo San Sebastian an Independent who only got 103,981 votes.

In 2022 elections, she ran again as Vice Governor of Laguna for her third and final term under the PDP–Laban and won 844,447 votes or semi-landslide votes defeating the son of former Governor E. R. Ejercito and actor Jerico Ejercito of PFP who got 527,978 votes and Agustine Parma, an independent who only got 30,906 votes.

== Personal life ==
Agapay is single and unmarried. She is also member of the Girl Scouts of the Philippines.
