= Totoy Tingzon =

Filipino politician

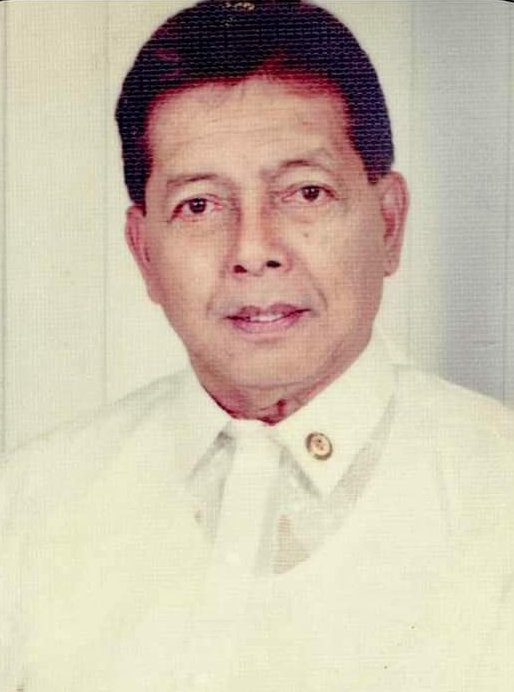

Member of the House of Representatives from Laguna's 2nd district
- In office June 30, 1992 – June 30, 1995
- Preceded by: Jun Chipeco
- Succeeded by: Jun Chipeco

3rd Vice Governor of Laguna
- In office January 30, 1980 – February 26, 1986
- Governor: Felicisimo San Luis
- Preceded by: William Dichoso
- Succeeded by: Leandro Balquiedra

Personal details
- Born: Rodolfo del Rosario Tingzon; September 14, 1926
- Died: November 17, 2023 (aged 97)
- Party: Laban ng Demokratikong Pilipino; Lakas–NUCD–UMDP

Rodolfo "Totoy" del Rosario Tingzon Sr. (September 14, 1926 – November 17, 2023) was a Filipino politician, sports executive, and coach.

== Early life and education ==
Rodolfo "Totoy" Tingzon was born on September 14, 1926. He is the son of baseball player and coach Julio Tingzon of the Canlubang Sugar Barons. He attended the National University (NU) and played baseball for the NU Bulldogs.

== Baseball ==
After graduation from NU, Tingzon managed his father's team Canlubang to a seven-straight championship at the Manila Bay Baseball League from 1965.

He established the Little League Baseball program in the Philippines in 1964 and is considered the "Father of Youth Baseball" in the country. He also founded PONY Baseball and Softball in Asia in 1975 and co-founded the World Boys Baseball Federation in 1982.

In 2010, Tingzon was inducted to the PONY Baseball/Softball International Hall of Fame.

== Political career ==
Tingzon was vice governor of Laguna from 1980 to 1986. He was also a member of the House of Representatives for the province's second district from 1992 to 1995. He was part of the Laban ng Demokratikong Pilipino (LDP).

He later ran for Laguna governor in the 1995 election under the Lakas–NUCD–UMDP party but lost to Joey Lina.

== Death ==
Tingzon died in his sleep on November 17, 2023 at age 97.
