= Governor of Laguna =

Head of the provincial government of Laguna, Philippines

- Gobernador ng Lalawigan ng Laguna
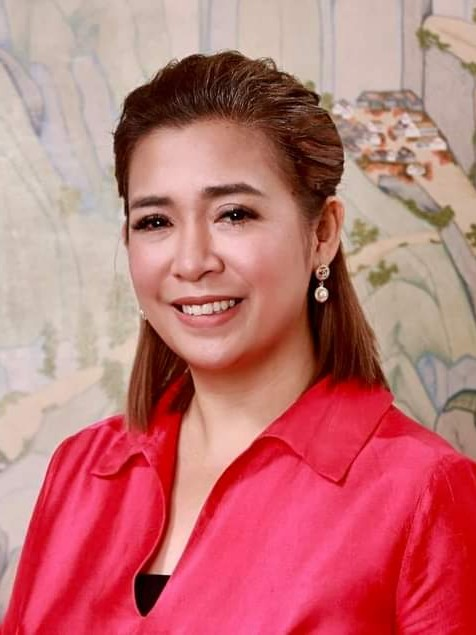
- Incumbent; Sol Aragones since June 30, 2025
- Style: (Mrs.) Governor, Honorable Governor, Your Honor,
- Residence: Laguna Government Center, Santa Cruz, Laguna
- Seat: Laguna Provincial Capitol, Santa Cruz, Laguna
- Term length: 3 years
- Inaugural holder: Juan Cailles
- Formation: 1901
- Deputy: Vice Governor
- Website: Official Website of the Province of Laguna

The Governor of Laguna (Filipino: Punong Lalawigan ng Laguna) is the highest political office in the province of Laguna, Philippines. The governor holds office at the Laguna Provincial Capitol in Santa Cruz, Laguna and alternatively at the Laguna Provincial Capitol Extension in Calamba, Laguna.

== List of governors of Laguna ==
=== Pre-Independence Governors (1899–1946) ===
Order	Image	Governor	Party	Term in Office	Home Municipality
1		Gen. Juan Cailles (1871–1951)	Independent/Federalista	1899–1901	Santa Cruz
-		Gen. Juan Cailles (1871–1951)	Federalista/Progresista	1902–1910	Santa Cruz
2		Potenciano C. Malvar (1867–1964)	Nacionalista	July 10, 1910 – July 14, 1914	San Pablo
3		Marcos A. Paulino (1871–1951)	Progresista	1914–1916	San Pablo
–		Gen. Juan Cailles (1871–1951)	Progresista/Democrata	1916–1925	Santa Cruz
4		Feliciano A. Gomez (1882–1944)	Nacionalista Consolidado	1925–1928	Santa Rosa
5		Tomas D. Dizon (1888–1966)	Nacionalista Consolidado	1928–1931	San Pablo
–		Gen. Juan Cailles (1871–1951)	Democrata/National Socialist/Nacionalista Democrata	1932–1938	Santa Cruz
6		Arsenio L. Bonifacio (1893–1976)	Nacionalista	1938–1939	Santa Cruz
7		Agustin V. Gana (1885–1950)	Nacionalista	1939–1940	Biñan
8		Jesus C. Bautista (1897–1987)	KALIBAPI	1941–1944	Santa Cruz
9		Marcelo P. Zorilla (1898–1945)	KALIBAPI	1944–1945	Mabitac
–		Gen. Juan Cailles (1871–1951)	Democratic Alliance	1945	Santa Cruz
10		Augusto H. de Castro (1904–1959)	Nacionalista	1945–June 1946	Biñan

=== Post-Independence Governors (1946–present) ===
No.	Portrait	Governor Office (Note: Office before became/elected Governor.) (Lifespan)	Party	Term of office			Election	City/Municipality	Vice Governor	
No.	Portrait	Governor Office (Lifespan)	Party	start	end	duration	Election	City/Municipality	Vice Governor	
11		Juan Pambuan; Member of Provincial Board (1904–1970)	Liberal	11 June 1946	30 December 1947	1 year, 202 days	—	Santa Cruz	None (11 June 1946–30 December 1959)	
12		Dominador Chipeco Sr. Provincial Administrator of Laguna (1906–1980)	Nacionalista	30 December 1947	30 December 1959	12 years, 0 days	1947	Calamba	None (11 June 1946–30 December 1959)	
12		Dominador Chipeco Sr. Provincial Administrator of Laguna (1906–1980)	Nacionalista	30 December 1947	30 December 1959	12 years, 0 days	1951	Calamba	None (11 June 1946–30 December 1959)	
12		Dominador Chipeco Sr. Provincial Administrator of Laguna (1906–1980)	Nacionalista	30 December 1947	30 December 1959	12 years, 0 days	1955	Calamba	None (11 June 1946–30 December 1959)	
13		Felicisimo San Luis; Councilor of Santa Cruz (1919–1992)	Liberal	30 December 1959	18 December 1992	32 years, 354 days	1959	Santa Cruz	Liberal	Ruben de Roma (1959–1967)
13		Felicisimo San Luis; Councilor of Santa Cruz (1919–1992)	Liberal	30 December 1959	18 December 1992	32 years, 354 days	1963	Santa Cruz	Liberal	Ruben de Roma (1959–1967)
13		Felicisimo San Luis; Councilor of Santa Cruz (1919–1992)	Liberal	30 December 1959	18 December 1992	32 years, 354 days	1967	Santa Cruz	Liberal	William Dichoso (1967–1980)
13		Felicisimo San Luis; Councilor of Santa Cruz (1919–1992)	Liberal	30 December 1959	18 December 1992	32 years, 354 days	1971	Santa Cruz	Liberal	William Dichoso (1967–1980)
13		Felicisimo San Luis; Councilor of Santa Cruz (1919–1992)	KBL	30 December 1959	18 December 1992	32 years, 354 days	1980	Santa Cruz	KBL	Rodolfo Tingzon Sr. (1980–1986)
13		Felicisimo San Luis; Councilor of Santa Cruz (1919–1992)	PSL	30 December 1959	18 December 1992	32 years, 354 days	1980	Santa Cruz	KBL	Rodolfo Tingzon Sr. (1980–1986)
13		Felicisimo San Luis; Councilor of Santa Cruz (1919–1992)	KBL	30 December 1959	18 December 1992	32 years, 354 days	1980	Santa Cruz	KBL	Leandro Balquiedra (February–March 1986)
13		Felicisimo San Luis; Councilor of Santa Cruz (1919–1992)	Independent	30 December 1959	18 December 1992	32 years, 354 days	1980	Santa Cruz	Independent	Joaquin Chipeco Jr. (Note: Appointed Acting Governor from May 19, 1986 until June 19, 1986.) (1986–1987)
13		Felicisimo San Luis; Councilor of Santa Cruz (1919–1992)	UNIDO	30 December 1959	18 December 1992	32 years, 354 days	1980	Santa Cruz	UNIDO	Joaquin Chipeco Jr. (1986–1987)
13		Felicisimo San Luis; Councilor of Santa Cruz (1919–1992)	Liberal	30 December 1959	18 December 1992	32 years, 354 days	1980	Santa Cruz	Liberal	Joaquin Chipeco Jr. (1986–1987)
13		Felicisimo San Luis; Councilor of Santa Cruz (1919–1992)	Liberal	30 December 1959	18 December 1992	32 years, 354 days	1980	Santa Cruz	Liberal	Restituto Luna (1987–1992)
13		Felicisimo San Luis; Councilor of Santa Cruz (1919–1992)	LnB	30 December 1959	18 December 1992	32 years, 354 days	1988	Santa Cruz	LnB	Restituto Luna (1987–1992)
13		Felicisimo San Luis; Councilor of Santa Cruz (1919–1992)	LDP	30 December 1959	18 December 1992	32 years, 354 days	1992	Santa Cruz	LDP	Restituto Luna (1987–1992)
14		Restituto Luna; Vice Governor of Laguna (1925–2002)	LDP	18 December 1992	30 June 1995	2 years, 194 days	—	Calamba	NPC	Teresita Lazaro (1992–2001)
15		Jose Lina Jr. Senator of the Philippines (born 1951)	Laban	30 June 1995	26 January 2001	5 years, 210 days	1995	Victoria	Laban	Teresita Lazaro (1992–2001)
15		Jose Lina Jr. Senator of the Philippines (born 1951)	LAMMP	30 June 1995	26 January 2001	5 years, 210 days	1998	Victoria	LAMMP	Teresita Lazaro (1992–2001)
16		Teresita Lazaro; Vice Governor of Laguna (born 1942)	LAMMP	26 January 2001	30 June 2010	9 years, 155 days	1998	Calamba	Vacant (26–27 January 2001)	
16		Teresita Lazaro; Vice Governor of Laguna (born 1942)	LAMMP	26 January 2001	30 June 2010	9 years, 155 days	1998	Calamba	LAMMP	Gat-Ala Alatiit (January–June 2001)
16		Teresita Lazaro; Vice Governor of Laguna (born 1942)	PMP	26 January 2001	30 June 2010	9 years, 155 days	2001	Calamba	NPC	Danilo Ramon Fernandez (2001–2004)
16		Teresita Lazaro; Vice Governor of Laguna (born 1942)	Lakas	26 January 2001	30 June 2010	9 years, 155 days	2004	Calamba	Lakas	Edwin Olivarez (2004–2007)
16		Teresita Lazaro; Vice Governor of Laguna (born 1942)	Lakas	26 January 2001	30 June 2010	9 years, 155 days	2007	Calamba	UNO	Ramil Hernandez (2007–2010)
17		Emillio Ramon Ejercito III; Mayor of Pagsanjan (born 1963)	PMP	30 June 2010	27 May 2014	3 years, 331 days	2010	Pagsanjan	Lakas	Caesar Perez (2010–2013)
17		Emillio Ramon Ejercito III; Mayor of Pagsanjan (born 1963)	UNA	30 June 2010	27 May 2014	3 years, 331 days	2013	Pagsanjan	Nacionalista	Ramil Hernandez (2013–2014)
18		Ramil Hernandez; Vice Governor of Laguna (born 1972)	Nacionalista	27 May 2014	30 June 2025	11 years, 34 days	2013	Calamba	Vacant (27–30 May 2014)	
18		Ramil Hernandez; Vice Governor of Laguna (born 1972)	Nacionalista	27 May 2014	30 June 2025	11 years, 34 days	2013	Calamba	Independent	Katherine Agapay (2014–2025)
18		Ramil Hernandez; Vice Governor of Laguna (born 1972)	Nacionalista	27 May 2014	30 June 2025	11 years, 34 days	2016	Calamba	Nacionalista	Katherine Agapay (2014–2025)
18		Ramil Hernandez; Vice Governor of Laguna (born 1972)	PDP–Laban	27 May 2014	30 June 2025	11 years, 34 days	2019	Calamba	PDP–Laban	Katherine Agapay (2014–2025)
18		Ramil Hernandez; Vice Governor of Laguna (born 1972)	PDP–Laban	27 May 2014	30 June 2025	11 years, 34 days	2022	Calamba	PDP–Laban	Katherine Agapay (2014–2025)
18		Ramil Hernandez; Vice Governor of Laguna (born 1972)	PDP–Laban	27 May 2014	30 June 2025	11 years, 34 days	2022	Bay	PFP	Katherine Agapay (2014–2025)
18		Ramil Hernandez; Vice Governor of Laguna (born 1972)	Lakas	27 May 2014	30 June 2025	11 years, 34 days	2022	Bay	PFP	Katherine Agapay (2014–2025)
19		Marisol Aragones-Sampelo; 3rd District Representative (born 1977)	AKAY	30 June 2025	Incumbent	1 year, 109 days	2025	San Pablo	Lakas	Magtangol Jose Carait III (2025–Incumbent)

== Elections ==
- 1947 Laguna local elections
- 1951 Laguna local elections
- 1955 Laguna local elections
- 1959 Laguna local elections
- 1963 Laguna local elections
- 1967 Laguna local elections
- 1971 Laguna local elections
- 1980 Laguna local elections
- 1988 Laguna local elections
- 1992 Laguna local elections
- 1995 Laguna local elections
- 1998 Laguna local elections
- 2001 Laguna local elections
- 2004 Laguna local elections
- 2007 Laguna local elections
- 2010 Laguna local elections
- 2013 Laguna local elections
- 2016 Laguna local elections
- 2019 Laguna local elections
- 2022 Laguna local elections
- 2025 Laguna local elections

=== Election results ===
==== 1980 ====
1980 Laguna gubernatorial election
Party	Candidate	Votes	%
KBL	Felicisimo San Luis (Incumbent)	222,794	58.42
Nacionalista	Wenceslao Lagumbay	158,589	41.58
Total votes		381,383	100.00
KBL hold			

==== 1988 ====
1988 Laguna gubernatorial election
Party	Candidate	Votes	%
Lakas	Felicisimo San Luis (Incumbent)	301,654	66.64
NP–UNIDO	Edgardo Salandanan	98,688	21.80
NUCD	Rodolfo Tingzon	52,345	11.56
Total votes		452,687	100.00
Lakas hold			

==== 1992 ====
1992 Laguna gubernatorial election
Party	Candidate	Votes	%
LDP	Felicisimo San Luis (Incumbent)	241,304	46.12
NPC	Nereo Joaquin Sr.	167,768	32.06
Nacionalista	Cesar Dizon	95,242	18.20
LP–PDP	Ma. Lina Litton	9,346	1.79
LDP	Reynaldo Roasa	7,300	1.40
KBL	Zosimo De Baybay	2,265	0.43
Total votes		520,960	100.00
LDP hold			

==== 1995 ====
1995 Laguna gubernatorial election
Party	Candidate	Votes	%
LDP	Jose Lina Jr.	278,981	47.73
Lakas	Rodolfo Tingzon	202,336	34.62
Independent	Restituto Luna (Incumbent)	76,722	13.13
NPC	Felicidad San Luis	26,419	4.52
Total votes		584,458	100.00
LDP gain from Independent			

==== 1998 ====
1998 Laguna gubernatorial election
Party	Candidate	Votes	%
LAMMP	Jose Lina Jr. (Incumbent)	602,461	81.97
Lakas	Florante Aquino	132,500	18.03
Total votes		734,961	100.00
LAMMP hold			

==== 2001 ====
2001 Laguna gubernatorial election
Party	Candidate	Votes	%
PMP	Teresita Lazaro (Incumbent)	401,424	60.47
KAMPI	Alberto Lina	262,403	39.53
Total votes		663,827	100.00
PMP hold			

==== 2004 ====
2004 Laguna gubernatorial election
Party	Candidate	Votes	%
Lakas	Teresita Lazaro (Incumbent)	317,116	35.32
PDSP	Dan Fernandez	302,654	33.71
LDP	Rodolfo San Luis	278,108	30.79
Total votes		897,878	100.00
Lakas hold			

==== 2007 ====
2007 Laguna gubernatorial election
Party	Candidate	Votes	%
Lakas–Kampi	Teresita Lazaro (Incumbent)	425,732	52.13
UNO	Edwin Olivarez	390,891	47.87
Total votes		816,623	100.00
Lakas–Kampi hold			

==== 2010 ====
2010 Laguna gubernatorial election
Party	Candidate	Votes	%
PMP	Emilio Ramon Ejercito III	334,530	34.88
Lakas–Kampi	Dennis Lazaro	260,440	24.78
Liberal	Jose Lina Jr.	234,473	24.45
Nacionalista	Ramil Hernandez	123,670	12.89
Independent	Christine Amador	3,634	0.38
Independent	Randy Bautista	2,311	0.24
Total votes		1,050,890	100.00
PMP gain from Lakas–Kampi			

==== 2013 ====
2013 Laguna gubernatorial election
Party	Candidate	Votes	%
UNA	Emilio Ramon Ejercito III (Incumbent)	566,325	55.47
Liberal	Edgar San Luis	454,633	44.53
Total votes		1,020,958	100.00
UNA hold			

==== 2016 ====
2016 Laguna gubernatorial election
Party	Candidate	Votes	%
Nacionalista	Ramil Hernandez (Incumbent)	606,002	51.54
PGP	Jorge Antonio Ejercito	336,797	28.65
UNA	Emilio Ramon Ejercito III	232,927	19.81
Total votes		1,175,726	100.00
Nacionalista hold			

==== 2019 ====
2019 Laguna gubernatorial election
Party	Candidate	Votes	%
PDP–Laban	Ramil Hernandez (Incumbent)	817,250	66.55
PFP	Emilio Ramon Ejercito III	391,270	31.86
Independent	Berlene Alberto	7,414	0.60
PDDS	Lope Grajera	4,362	0.35
Independent	Leonardo Almadrigo	4,063	0.33
Independent	Manolo Samia	3,652	0.29
Total votes		1,227,214	100.00
PDP–Laban hold			

==== 2022 ====
2022 Laguna gubernatorial election
Party	Candidate	Votes	%
PDP–Laban	Ramil Hernandez (Incumbent)	872,378	57.60
Nacionalista	Sol Aragones–Sampelo	630,232	41.62
Independent	Berlene Alberto	11,936	0.79
Total votes		1,514,637	100.00
PDP–Laban hold			

==== 2025 ====
2025 Laguna gubernatorial election
Candidate	Party	Votes	%
Sol Aragones	Akay National Political Party	635,570	39.80
Ruth Hernandez	Lakas–CMD	548,286	34.33
Dan Fernandez	National Unity Party	285,373	17.87
Katherine Agapay	Partido Federal ng Pilipinas	114,758	7.19
Caloy Reyes	Independent	4,508	0.28
Koyang Noli Samia	Independent	2,063	0.13
Alexander Tolentino	Independent	6,418	0.40
Total		1,596,976	100.00
Valid votes		1,596,976	93.91
Invalid/blank votes		103,653	6.09
Total votes		1,700,629	100.00
Registered voters/turnout		2,140,124	79.46
AKAY gain from Lakas			
Source: Commission on Elections

== See also ==
- Laguna
- Laguna Provincial Board
- Legislative districts of Laguna
