= Maita Sanchez =

Filipino politician and actress (1969–2024)

Maita Javier Ejercito

Vice Mayor of Pagsanjan
- In office June 30, 2019 – June 30, 2022
- Mayor: Peter Casius Trinidad
- Preceded by: Peter Casius Trinidad
- Succeeded by: Terryl Gamit–Talabong

President of the League of Municipalities of the Philippines Laguna Chapter
- In office July 5, 2010 – July 4, 2016
- Preceded by: Ariel Magcalas (until June 30, 2010)
- Succeeded by: Antonio Carolino

Mayor of Pagsanjan
- In office June 30, 2010 – June 30, 2019
- Vice Mayor: Crisostomo Vilar (2010–2013); Terryl Gamit-Talabong (2013–2016); Peter Casius Trinidad (2016–2019)
- Preceded by: E. R. Ejercito
- Succeeded by: Peter Casius Trinidad

Personal details
- Born: Girlie Yulatic Javier; April 2, 1969 Negros Occidental
- Died: November 3, 2024 (aged 55) Quezon City, Philippines
- Party: PFP (2018–2024)
- Other political affiliations: UNA (2012–2018); PMP (until 2012)
- Spouse: E. R. Ejercito
- Children: 7
- Occupation: Politician, actress

Girlie Javier Ejercito (born Girlie Yulatic Javier, April 2, 1969 – November 3, 2024), known professionally as Maita Sanchez, was a Filipino politician and actress. She served as the mayor of Pagsanjan, Laguna, for nine years, from 2010 until 2019.

== Career ==
Javier-Ejercito was involved in the entertainment industry before switching to politics. She had an acting career under the name Maita Sanchez. Her political career began with her election as mayor of Pagsanjan, a position she held for nine years until 2019.

In the 2010 elections, she successfully ran for mayor of Pagsanjan, Laguna, succeeding her term-limited husband E. R. Ejercito, who successfully ran for governor of Laguna. She entered the political scene as part of a broader trend of celebrities seeking local and national government positions.

In 2013, Javier-Ejercito faced scrutiny from the COMELEC regarding her campaign expenditures during her bid for a second term as mayor of Pagsanjan. The campaign spending limit for mayoralty candidates in Pagsanjan, based on its voting population of 22,584, was set at ₱67,752 (equivalent to ₱85,053 in 2021). Her Statement of Contributions and Expenditures (SOCE) revealed that she spent a total of ₱80,160.31 (equivalent to ₱100,630 in 2021) during her campaign, exceeding the legal spending cap by ₱12,408.31 (equivalent to ₱15,577 in 2021).

Following her term as mayor, she was elected vice mayor of Pagsanjan in May 2019. In the May 2022 elections, she announced her candidacy for mayor of Pagsanjan once again and subsequently lost. According to her husband, E. R. Ejercito, she was supposed to run for vice mayor of Pagsanjan in 2025, but did not file her candidacy while hospitalized due to endometrial cancer.

== Personal life ==
Javier-Ejercito was the second wife of former Laguna Governor, E. R. Ejercito. She experienced multiple miscarriages. They have seven children: John Paul (Jet), Jorge Antonio Genaro (Jerico), Maria Guadalupe (Jhulia), Maria Angelica Victoria (died in 2004), an unnamed child (died in 2010), Juan Diego (Diego), and Maria Gabriela (Gabby). Three of their children also entered politics: Jerico unsuccessfully ran for vice governor of Laguna in 2022 and in 2025; Jhulia ran unsuccessfully for the Laguna Provincial Board from the 4th district in 2025; and Jet is a councilor of Pagsanjan since 2025.

== Illness and death ==
In 2015, Javier-Ejercito was diagnosed with stage 2 breast cancer, which doctors at St. Luke's Medical Center – Quezon City attributed it primarily to stress, as she had no family history of cancer. According to her husband, E. R. Ejercito, her condition may have been triggered by stress after he was unseated as Laguna governor in 2014 due to alleged overspending during the campaign for the 2013 midterm elections. She underwent treatment in 2017 and was declared cancer-free. However, she was later diagnosed with stage 4 endometrial cancer in 2023, which Ejercito believed was exacerbated by the stress caused by her unsuccessful 2022 run for Pagsanjan mayor. She was confined multiple times since then, with her final confinement beginning in July 2024.

She died at St. Luke's Medical Center – Quezon City, on November 3, 2024 at 12:01 am PHT, at the age of 55. Her wake was held at their residence, the Don Porong Ejercito 1912 Ancestral Mansion, in Pagsanjan from November 3 to 9, followed by a funeral procession in the town and funeral Mass at the Our Lady of Guadalupe Parish Church on November 9. Her remains were cremated at the Arlington Memorial Chapels in Quezon City on November 10.

== Filmography ==
Year	Film	Notes
1988	Sa Dulo ng Baril	
1989	Ka Leon Oliver, Ex-rebel	
1990	Hindi Kita Iiwanang Buhay (Kapitan Paile)	
1991	Katabi Ko'y Mamaw	
1993	Task Force Habagat	
1995	Epifanio Ang Bilas Ko: NB-Eye	
1996	Hagedorn	
1997	Bayad puri	
1997	Tekkie	
1998	Pagbabalik ng Probinsyano	
2000	Ang Dalubhasa	
2002	Batas ng Lansangan	
2012	El Presidente	Kim Komatsu nanalo sa Star Award for Original Theme Song of the Year Best Film Soundtrack - Gawad Genio Awards "Aking Inang Bayan" Best Theme Song at 61st FAMAS Awards - Interpreted by Maita Ejercito
2014	Muslim Magnum .357: To Serve and Protect	
2014	Asintado	
2023	Shake, Rattle & Roll Extreme	"Rage"

Political offices
Preceded by ER Ejercito	Mayor of Pagsanjan, Laguna; 2010–2019	Succeeded by Peter Casius Trinidad
Preceded by Ariel Magcalas	President of LMP Laguna Chapter; 2010–2016	Succeeded by Antonio Carolino
Preceded by Peter Casius Trinidad	Vice Mayor of Pagsanjan, Laguna; 2019–2022	Succeeded by Terryl Gamit–Talabong
