= Eagle Squad =

Philippine action film

- Directed by: Jose N. Carreon
- Written by: Jose N. Carreon; Rene Villanueva; Jojo Lapus
- Produced by: Jesse Ejercito
- Starring: Edu Manzano; Ricky Davao; Julio Diaz; Robin Padilla; George Estregan Jr.; Monsour del Rosario; Nick Martel; Jinggoy Estrada
- Cinematography: Ely Cruz
- Edited by: Augusto Salvador
- Music by: Jaime Fabregas
- Production company: Viva Films
- Distributed by: Viva Films
- Release date: April 5, 1989
- Running time: 100 minutes
- Country: Philippines
- Language: Filipino

Eagle Squad is a 1989 Philippine action film co-written and directed by Jose N. Carreon. The film stars Edu Manzano, Ricky Davao, Julio Diaz, Robin Padilla, George Estregan Jr., Monsour del Rosario, Nick Martel and Jinggoy Estrada.

The film is streaming online on YouTube.

== Cast ==
- Edu Manzano as Edmund Morales
- Ricky Davao as Carding de Villa
- Julio Diaz as Jun Domingo
- Robin Padilla as Raymond Perez
- George Estregan Jr. as Jett Espino
- Monsour del Rosario as Mon Rivera
- Nick Martel as Noel Martin
- Jinggoy Estrada as Johnny Estrella
- Zandro Zamora as Capt. Zarraga
- Paquito Diaz as Sgt. David
- Robert Talabis as Lt. Torres
- Val Iglesias as Capt. Inciong
- Jaime Fabregas as Syndicate Boss
- Bomber Moran as Kabo Morgan
- Ernie Zarate as Gen. Santos
- Eddie Infante as Monsignor
- Ester Chavez as Jun's Mother
- Mimi Mercado as Jun's Wife
- Ramon D'Salva as Edmund's Father
- Alma Lerma as Edmund's Mother
- Augusto Victa as Johnny's Father
- Vic Varrion as Jett's Father
- Maylene Gonzales as Carding's Wife
- Alex Bolado as Sparrow Head
- Danny Labra as Sparrow Informer
- Caloy Salvador as Sparrow Hitman
- Freddie Papa as Police Informer
- Rene Hawkins as Johnny's Suspect
- Polly Cadsawan as Jun's Victim
