= Caesar Perez =

Filipino politician (1954–2020)

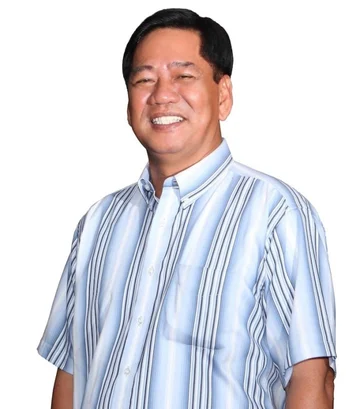

Mayor of Los Baños
- In office June 30, 2013 – December 3, 2020
- Vice Mayor: Antonio Kalaw (2019–2020); Procopio Alipon (2013–2019)
- Preceded by: Anthony Genuino
- Succeeded by: Antonio Kalaw
- In office June 30, 2001 – June 30, 2010
- Preceded by: Francisco Lapis
- Succeeded by: Anthony Genuino

12th Vice Governor of Laguna
- In office June 30, 2010 – June 30, 2013
- Governor: E. R. Ejercito
- Preceded by: Ramil Hernandez
- Succeeded by: Ramil Hernandez

Personal details
- Born: Caesar Pabalate Perez; January 29, 1954
- Died: December 3, 2020 (aged 66) Los Baños, Laguna
- Party: Independent (2018–2020); Liberal (2015–2018); Akbayan (2012–2015); Lakas–CMD (until 2012)
- Children: 1

Caesar Pabalate Perez (January 29, 1954 – December 3, 2020) was a Filipino politician who served as mayor of Los Baños, Laguna for 17 non-consecutive years, from 2001 to 2010 and 2013 until his assassination in 2020, as well as vice governor of Laguna from 2010 to 2013.

A farmer prior to entering politics, Perez began his political career in 1989 as barangay captain of Batong Malake, and was soon elected president of the Liga ng mga Barangay (lit. 'League of Barangays') in both the municipality of Los Baños and the province of Laguna.

On December 3, 2020, Perez was assassinated behind the municipal hall by a hidden gunman. Former opposition councilor Norvin Tamisin was arrested in Baguio City in November 2021 due to his alleged connection to the assassination, but later testified before Congress that he was framed by authorities.

== Political career ==
=== Mayor of Los Baños (2001–2010) ===
Perez was successfully elected as mayor of Los Baños in 2001. He was re-elected in 2004 and in 2007.

=== Vice Governor of Laguna (2010–2013) ===
Upon being term-limited as mayor, Perez ran for Vice Governor of Laguna in 2010 as the running mate of Laguna provincial administrator Dennis Lazaro, the son of outgoing Governor Teresita Lazaro, under the Lakas–Kampi–CMD ticket. Although the younger Lazaro lost to Pagsanjan Mayor E. R. Ejercito, Perez was elected as the provincial vice governor, serving from 2010 to 2013.

=== Mayor of Los Baños (2013–2020) ===
Perez decided not to seek reelection as vice governor to run for mayor of Los Baños again under the Akbayan Citizens' Action Party in the 2013 elections, winning over incumbent Mayor Anthony Genuino. Upon his inauguration, Perez stated that his mayorship would focus on the town's sports development and traffic management, as well as the cleaning of Laguna de Bay.

His tenure as mayor was characterized by a focus on environmental protection, with his ban on single-use plastic bags in 2008 making Los Baños the first municipality to regulate plastic bag use in the Philippines. One of his staunch opponents throughout his mayorship was councilor Norvin Tamisin.

== Assassination ==
Perez was assassinated behind the Los Baños Municipal Hall at approximately 8:45 p.m. PHT on December 3, 2020. He had just come from inspecting a project in Barangay Baybayin with Councilor Janos Lapiz when he arrived at the municipal hall that evening and asked for a masseuse. After his massage, Perez instructed his driver and assistant to bring the masseuse home, upon which he began feeding the carp in his koi pond behind the town hall and taking a stroll in an open area with one civilian guard present. During his stroll, Perez was shot in the head by an unseen gunman, with two more shots in the chest and one graze wound on his right shoulder. The guard took him to the HealthServ Medical Center, also in Los Baños, where he was pronounced dead at 9:25 p.m. His younger brother, Ruel Perez, had previously been assassinated in May 2017.

On December 4, 2020, the Los Baños municipal council issued a resolution declaring a state of mourning in Los Baños up to December 12. On the same day, the Department of Justice instructed the National Bureau of Investigation (NBI) to investigate the assassination and submit periodic updates on their progress. Media reports regarding the assassination regularly pointed out that Perez was mentioned during President Rodrigo Duterte's reading of a list of "narco-politicians" who are allegedly involved in the illegal drug trade, which Perez's son Aldous believes had been the reason for his assassination. A month prior to his assassination, Perez went to the Philippine Drug Enforcement Agency (PDEA) to be tested for drugs to prove his innocence.

In early May 2021, a Laguna police task force issued a murder complaint against former councilor Norvin L. Tamisin and government official Glenn Arieta based on eyewitness accounts of the incident. Tamisin had continuously denied his involvement in the assassination in interviews, expressing his bafflement on how he was placed by eyewitnesses in the crime scene. On October 22, the Los Baños Regional Trial Court (RTC) Branch 107 issued an arrest warrant for murder against Tamisin, and by November 2, Tamisin was captured in Baguio City by a joint team of Batangas police and the Criminal Investigation and Detection Group (CIDG) as the sixth most wanted person in Region IV-A. Tamisin later testified before Congress that he left Los Baños in order to protect his family from potential harm by the police and not to go into hiding. After his capture, he spent the next seven months in jail, and by mid-2022 was allowed by the RTC to post bail.

In October 2024, Tamisin was invited to testify before a congressional inquiry into extrajudicial killings during the Duterte administration, where he asserted that he was framed by the police through the use of a "bogus" witness to place him in the crime scene. Tamisin also confirmed in the hearing that surveillance footage taken in Los Baños a few days prior to Perez's murder featured a man he considers to have a strong resemblance to Cebu City police captain Keneth Paul Albotra, a person previously cited in the hearing as being involved in Tanauan, Batangas mayor Antonio Halili's assassination, whom Tamisin believes to be involved in the assassination of Perez.

=== Funeral ===
Perez's remains laid at his residence in the days after the assassination. On December 8, they were brought to a funeral car for a five-hour procession through all 14 barangays in Los Baños before reaching the Los Baños Municipal Hall at 2:15 p.m. to be laid in state for four days. On December 12, Perez was buried at a cemetery.

Political offices
Preceded by Ramil Hernandez	Vice Governor of Laguna; 2010–2013	Succeeded by Ramil Hernandez
