= Ramil Hernandez =

Filipino politician (born 1972)

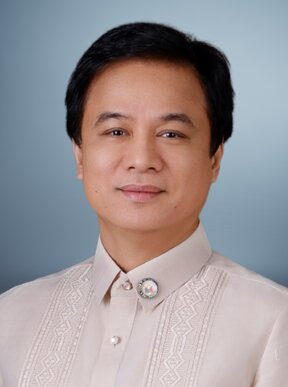
- Official portrait, 2025

Member of the Philippine House of Representatives from Laguna's 2nd congressional district
- Incumbent
- Assumed office June 30, 2025
- Preceded by: Ruth Hernandez

18th Governor of Laguna
- In office May 27, 2014 – June 30, 2025
- Vice Governor: Katherine Agapay
- Preceded by: E.R. Ejercito
- Succeeded by: Sol Aragones

11th and 13th Vice Governor of Laguna
- In office June 30, 2013 – May 27, 2014
- Governor: E.R. Ejercito
- Preceded by: Caesar Perez
- Succeeded by: Karen Agapay
- In office June 30, 2007 – June 30, 2010
- Governor: Teresita Lazaro
- Preceded by: Edwin Olivarez
- Succeeded by: Caesar Perez

Member of the Laguna Provincial Board from the Laguna's 2nd congressional district
- In office June 30, 2004 – June 30, 2007

Member of the Calamba City Council (Calamba Municipal Council (1995–2001)
- In office June 30, 1995 – June 30, 2004

Sangguniang Kabataan Chairman of Mabato, Calamba
- In office January 1993 – June 30, 1995

Personal details
- Born: Ramil Laurel Hernandez; July 26, 1972 (age 54) Calamba, Laguna, Philippines
- Party: Lakas (1998–2007; 2024–present)
- Other political affiliations: PDP–Laban (2018–2024); Nacionalista (2009–2018); UNO (2007–2009); LDP (1995–1998)
- Spouse: Ruth Mariano (m. 2001)
- Children: 2
- Education: Colegio de San Juan de Letran Calamba (B.S.)

Ramil Laurel Hernandez (born July 26, 1972) is a Filipino politician who has served as the representative for Laguna's second district since 2025. A member of Lakas–CMD, he previously served as the 18th governor of Laguna from 2014 to 2025 and as vice governor from 2007 to 2010 and again from 2013 to 2014.

A graduate of Colegio de San Juan de Letran, Hernandez entered politics in 1992 after being elected as the chairman of the Sanguniang Kabataan in Mabato, Calamba. He was subsequently elected to the Calamba Municipal Council (later the Calamba City Council) and later the Laguna Provincial Board. Upon being term-limited in the latter in 2007, he launched a successful bid for vice governor. After one term, he pursued the governorship in the 2010 elections and was defeated, placing fourth.

Hernandez was elected back to the vice governorship in the 2013 elections, serving under Governor E.R. Ejercito. After the Commission on Elections disqualified Ejercito from the position in May 2014, he assumed the governorship. He was elected to a full term as governor in 2016 and was re-elected in 2019 and 2022. In 2025, he was elected to the House of Representatives, succeeding his wife Ruth. In 2026, Hernandez voted against the second impeachment of Vice President Sara Duterte.

== Early life and education ==
Hernandez was born on July 26, 1972, in Barangay Mabato, Calamba, Laguna and is the third among the thirteen children of Norberto Perea Hernandez, who served as the barangay captain of Mabato, and Rosalinda Laurel Hernandez. He finished his primary studies as a valedictorian of Mabato Elementary School in 1985.

He was elected as a president of Student Body Organization and became Corps Commander of Citizen Advancement Training I during his high school days in Laguna College of Business and Arts. Moreover, an award was given to him in Leadership, Duty, Service and Talent and joined the Honor Society.

While he was studying in Colegio de San Juan de Letran - Calamba, he worked as a service crew at a fast food chain while taking up Bachelor of Science in Commerce, Major in Accounting. In 1993, he graduated in college and received an award as the Best Student Researcher.

== Political career ==
Hernandez entered the field of public service in 1992 as Sanguniang Kabataan chairman of Barangay Mabato, Calamba, Laguna and won. Following this, he was elected as a municipal councilor at the young age of 22. He served for three consecutive terms from 1995 to 2004 and was also installed as the President of the National Movement of Young Legislators (NMYL) Laguna Chapter. In 2004, he ran for the Provincial Board Member race and was proclaimed as number one board member of the province with 121,672 total votes and presided as Majority Floor Leader of Sangguniang Panlalawigan.

=== Vice Governor of Laguna (2007–2010; 2013–2014) ===
In 2007, Hernandez ran for Vice Governor as the running mate of gubernatorial candidate Edwin Olivarez, the then-Vice Governor, under United Opposition. At the age of 34, Hernandez was elected as Vice Governor; the youngest ever in the history of the province to take over the position who got 160,368 votes. Olivarez, however, lost to incumbent Governor Teresita Lazaro.

Even though he was still eligible to run for his second term, Hernandez pursued the governorship in 2010 while still being the youngest candidate in the province of Laguna. Running under the Nacionalista Party, he placed fourth behind E.R. Ejercito, the then-Mayor of Pagsanjan. Beating his two opponents, he was again elected as Vice Governor in 2013 for the second time with 388,859, whereas Ejercito was re-elected as Governor.

=== Governor of Laguna (2014–2025) ===
On May 21, 2014, Ejercito was disqualified by the Commission on Elections (COMELEC) First Division due to campaign overspending during the 2013 elections. The petitioner in the disqualification case is Edgar San Luis, who is the former Congressman of 4th district of Laguna and opponent of Ejercito for the 2013 gubernatorial race. Vice Governor Hernandez assumed the post as a Governor and was sworn in as the new governor of Laguna at the main office of the Commission on Elections (Comelec) in Manila on May 27, 2014. The writ of execution disqualifying Ejercito as the Governor was served by the Department of Interior and Local Government (DILG) on May 28, 2014, at the provincial capitol in Santa Cruz, Laguna.

Under Nacionalista Party, Hernandez ran for his first full three-year term as governor against his predecessor E.R. Ejercito and Jorge Antonio Ejercito in the 2016 elections. He was elected as the governor who garnered 606,002 votes beating his opponent, Ejercito with 232,927 votes. His running mate, Katherine Agapay (481,700 votes) assumed the vice governorship.

In the 2019 elections, Hernandez ran for re-election under the banner of the ruling PDP-Laban and faced E.R. Ejercito once again and four other candidates. With a total of 817,250 votes, he was re-elected to his second term as a governor along with his running mate, Katherine Agapay, who was re-elected as Vice Governor. They also ran for election in 2022 and re-elected to their third full term, with Hernandez gaining a total of 872,378 votes.

=== House of Representatives (2025–present) ===
Upon being term-limited as governor, Hernandez ran for representative of Laguna's 2nd congressional district in 2025 and won. He succeeded his wife Ruth, who also unsuccessfully ran for governor. During the election campaign period in May 2025, the couple faced a disqualification case for allegedly buying votes and misusing government resources, which the petitioners later withdrew.

On May 11, 2026, Hernandez voted against the second impeachment of Vice President Sara Duterte, contrasting with the favorable vote of his wife Ruth during the first impeachment of Duterte in 2025.

== Awards ==
Hernandez has received numerous prestigious awards throughout his career. Some of his most significant contributions include:

- 2014: Good Practices Award from the National Economic and Development Authority (NEDA) and the Department of Health (DOH).
- 2015: Gold Anvil Award for Public Relations Program Directed at Specific Stakeholders (External Communities) during the 50th Anvil Anniversary.
- 2015: A record of 51 awards, including three major awards from DOH Region IV-A, during the 3rd Kalusugan Pangkalahatan Awarding.
- 2016–2019: Hall of Fame recognition for both the Seal of Good Local Governance (SGLG) from the Department of the Interior and Local Government (DILG) and the Red Orchid Award from DOH.
- 2016: Best Provincial Police Office in Region IV-A.
- 2017: First-ever ISO 9001 Quality Management System Certification from the Government Quality Management Committee.
- 2018: Best Provincial Disaster Risk Reduction and Management Council (PDRRMC) award.
- 2018: Silver Award in the 1st National Anti-Drug Abuse Council (ADAC) Performance Awards.
- 2019: Gold Award in the National ADAC Performance Awards.

Additionally, Hernandez received the Gawad Parangal Award as an Outstanding Provincial Governor of the Philippines in the field of Social Welfare and Development from the Association of Local Social Welfare and Development Officers of the Philippines, Inc. (ALSWDOPI) in 2018, 2019, and 2020.

Other notable achievements include:

- 2019: Excellence Award from the Filipino Awards for Movies and Arts and Science, Inc.
- 2019: ATOP-DOT Pearl Award for Best Tourism Practices.
- 2019: 2nd Most Competitive Province Award from the Department of Trade and Industry (DTI).
- 2019: The Provincial Government of Laguna was recognized as a National Best Public Employment Service Office awardee.
- 2020: Laguna won the Digital Governance Award, securing:
  - Champion in Best in Customer Empowerment (G2C).
  - 2nd Place in Best in LGU Empowerment (G2G) for the provincial level.

== Personal life ==
He is married to fellow politician Ruth Mariano, whom he met and married while serving together as councilors of Calamba. They have two daughters.

Political offices
Preceded by Edwin Olivarez	Vice Governor of Laguna; 2007–2010	Succeeded by Caesar Perez
Preceded by Caesar Perez	Vice Governor of Laguna; 2013–2014	Succeeded by Karen Agapay
Preceded by E. R. Ejercito	Governor of Laguna; 2014–2025	Succeeded by Sol Aragones
House of Representatives of the Philippines
Preceded by Ruth Hernandez	Member of the House of Representatives from Laguna's 2nd district 2025–present	Incumbent
