= Teresita Lazaro =

Filipino politician (born 1942)

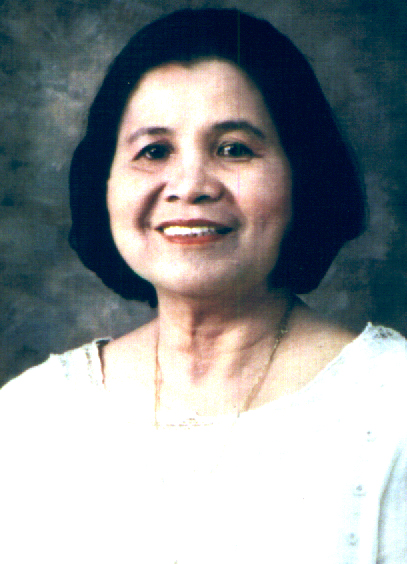

16th Governor of Laguna
- In office January 30, 2001 – June 30, 2010
- Vice Governor: Gat-Ala Alatiit (2001); Danilo Fernandez (2001–04); Edwin Olivarez (2004–07); Ramil Hernandez (2007–10)
- Preceded by: Joey Lina
- Succeeded by: E.R. Ejercito

7th Vice Governor of Laguna
- In office December 20, 1992 – January 29, 2001
- Governor: Restituto Luna (1992–95); Joey Lina (1995–2001)
- Preceded by: Restituto Luna
- Succeeded by: Gat-Ala Alatiit

Member of the Laguna Provincial Board from the 2nd district
- In office June 30, 1992 – December 20, 1992

Vice Mayor of Calamba, Laguna
- In office February 2, 1988 – June 30, 1992
- Mayor: Jesus Miguel Yulo
- Succeeded by: Severino Lajara

Member of the Calamba Municipal Council
- In office March 26, 1986 – February 1, 1988

Personal details
- Born: Teresita F. Santiago; November 18, 1942 (age 83) Calumpit, Bulacan, Philippine Commonwealth
- Party: PDP–Laban (since 2012)
- Other political affiliations: Lakas–Kampi (2004–2012); PMP (2001–04); LDP (1995–2001); NPC (until 1995)
- Spouse: Angelito L. Lazaro Sr.
- Children: 2
- Education: Far Eastern University
- Occupation: Businesswoman; politician
- Profession: Educator

Teresita "Ningning" Santiago Lazaro (born November 18, 1942) is a Filipino politician who served as the 16th governor of Laguna from 2001 to 2010. Before being elected governor, she served as vice governor from 1995 to 2001 and as a member of the Laguna Provincial Board from 1992 to 1995. She was the first female governor of Laguna.

== Life and career ==
Lazaro started her career in public service from 1964 to 1974 as a public elementary school teacher in Cabuyao and later in her hometown Calamba. Her notable achievement in business became the prime factor in her appointment as municipal councilor of Calamba by President Corazon C. Aquino in 1986.

This was followed by her election as Calamba's vice mayor in 1988 to 1992. “Shooting like a bright star” in the 1992 elections, she was voted overwhelmingly as member of the Laguna Provincial Board representing the 2nd district of Laguna, comprising the municipalities of Calamba, Los Baños, Bay, and Cabuyao.

With the death of Governor Felicisimo San Luis in 1992, then-Board Member Lazaro assumed the post of vice governor since she had most recently topped the list of elected board members. In 1994, she was suspended by Sandiganbayan for three months for violating the Anti-Graft and Corrupt Practices Act by converting agricultural land into a residential area, allegedly for personal gain.

In the 1995 elections, Vice Governor Lazaro teamed up with then-Senator Joey Lina, who ran for governor. The tandem won unanimously and both were once again re-elected during the 1998 elections. When President Gloria Macapagal Arroyo appointed Governor Joey Lina in 2001 as secretary of the Department of the Interior and Local Government, Vice Governor Lazaro was elevated to the governorship. She took her oath as Laguna's first female governor on January 30, 2001.

She ran for her first full term as governor in the 2001 elections, but was once disqualified over allegations of using government funds to promote her candidacy. However, her disqualification was later denied by the Supreme Court of the Philippines, upholding a Commission on Elections resolution ruling that her actions as governor were not equivalent to election campaigning. Thus, she was officially declared as the winner in the Laguna gubernatorial race during the election, where she won by a landslide. This was followed by her re-election for her second term in 2004 and her last and final term in 2007. Her term as governor ended in 2010. She was succeeded by Pagsanjan Mayor E.R. Ejercito, nephew of former president Joseph Estrada.

In the 2013 elections, she attempted a comeback to politics by running for representative of the 2nd district of Laguna. However, she lost to outgoing Calamba Mayor and former representative Jun Chipeco.

== Personal life ==
Lazaro is married to Angelito Lazaro Sr., with whom she has two sons: Dennis and Angelito Jr. (Totie). Dennis served as provincial administrator of Laguna during her final term as governor and ran unsuccessfully for governor in 2010. Totie has served as the vice mayor of Calamba since 2022.
