= E. R. Ejercito =

Filipino actor and politician (born 1963)

The Honorable Emilio Ramon P. Ejercito III
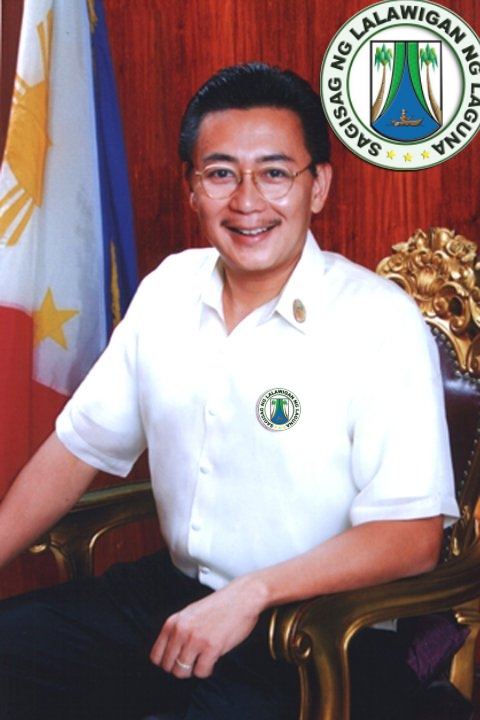
- Official portrait, 2010

17th Governor of Laguna
- In office June 30, 2010 – May 27, 2014
- Vice Governor: Caesar Perez (2010–2013); Ramil Hernandez (2013–2014)
- Preceded by: Teresita Lazaro
- Succeeded by: Ramil Hernandez

Mayor of Pagsanjan, Laguna
- In office June 30, 2025 – December 1, 2025
- Vice Mayor: Januario Ferry G. Garcia
- Preceded by: Cesar Areza
- Succeeded by: Januario Ferry G. Garcia
- In office June 30, 2001 – June 30, 2010
- Vice Mayor: Melvin Madriaga (2001–2004); Crisostomo Vilar (2004–2010)
- Preceded by: Abner Afuang
- Succeeded by: Girlie Javier-Ejercito

Personal details
- Born: Emilio Ramon Pelayo Ejercito III; October 5, 1963 (age 62) Mandaluyong, Rizal, Philippines
- Party: AKAY (2024–present)
- Other political affiliations: PFP (2018–2024); PDP–Laban (2016–2018); UNA (2012–2016); PMP (2001–2012)
- Spouses: Emma Rose Policarpio (m. 1987, separated) Girlie Javier (died 2024)
- Relations: Ejercito family
- Children: 8
- Parents: George Estregan (father); Ramona Pelayo-Ejercito (mother)
- Education: University of the Philippines Diliman (BA)
- Occupation: Politician, actor

Emilio Ramon Pelayo Ejercito III (Tagalog: [ʔɛˌhɛːɾ.sɪˈto]; born October 5, 1963), popularly known as E. R. Ejercito and Jorge “E. R.” Estregan, is a Filipino actor and mayor of Pagsanjan, Laguna for some months in 2025 and previously from 2001 to 2010. He also served as the governor of Laguna from 2010 until his removal in 2014. He is the son of actor George Estregan and the nephew of former President and former Manila Mayor Joseph Estrada.

== Early life and education ==
Born Emilio Ramon Pelayo Ejercito III on October 5, 1963, in Mandaluyong, then a municipality of Rizal province, to actor Jorgé Jesús Marcelo Ejercito (1939–1988) who went by the screen name George Estregan and Ramona Pelayo (1942–2020) from Ibajay, Aklan. He holds residence in Pagsanjan.

He studied at La Salle Green Hills for his primary and secondary education. He then studied at the University of the Philippines Diliman for his college education and earned a Bachelor of Fine Arts, Majoring in Advertising and Visual Communications.

== Acting career ==
In 1989, Ejercito began using the screen name George Estregan Jr. and Jorge Estregan, taken after his father's screen name, starring in the film Eagle Squad. He later went on to use Jorge "E. R." Estregan in his later acting career.

== Political career ==
Ejercito served as mayor of Pagsanjan, Laguna for three consecutive terms from 2001 to 2010. He then ran for governor in 2010 and was re-elected 2013. On May 27, 2014, the Commission on Elections unseated Ejercito after alleged overspending during the campaign for the 2013 midterm elections. Three days later, his uncle, Joseph Estrada, convinced him to step down. Despite the conviction, he attempted a comeback as governor in 2016 and 2019 but lost on both occasions to Ramil Hernandez.

On April 5, 2019, he was convicted and sentenced to 6 to 8 years in prison for graft over an anomalous insurance deal when he was mayor of Pagsanjan in 2008. The Sandiganbayan anti-graft court on August 7, 2019, upheld its earlier ruling that also barred Ejercito from holding public office.

Despite his conviction and controversial transfer of residency, Ejercito ran for mayor of Calamba in 2022, but eventually lost to Roseller Rizal.

Ejercito ran for mayor of Pagsanjan in 2025. However, that same year, the Supreme Court of the Philippines upheld the Sandiganbayan's 2019 graft conviction of Ejercito, affirming his sentence of 6 to 8 years in prison and perpetual disqualification from holding public office. This conviction stemmed from a 2008 incident where Ejercito, then mayor of Pagsanjan, awarded an insurance contract to a company lacking a license from Insurance Commission without public bidding. Despite this, Ejercito was elected mayor that May. However, he was removed as mayor on December 1, 2025, following an arrest warrant against him for such graft conviction.

== Personal life ==
Ejercito first married Emma Rose Policarpio, a 1987 Binibining Pilipinas contestant, in July 1987. However, they later got separated. They had a son, Emilio Ramon IV (Eric). He was later married to actress-politician Maita Sanchez (Girlie Javier-Ejercito in real life) in the 1990s until her death in 2024. They have seven children: John Paul (Jet), Jorge Antonio Genaro (Jerico), Maria Guadalupe (Jhulia), Maria Angelica Victoria (died in 2004), an unnamed child (died in 2010), Juan Diego (Diego), and Maria Gabriela (Gabby). Three of their children also entered politics: Jerico unsuccessfully ran for vice governor of Laguna in 2022 and in 2025; Jhulia ran unsuccessfully for the Laguna Provincial Board from the 4th district in 2025; and Jet is a councilor of Pagsanjan since 2025.

== Organizations ==
- Vice President – Knights of the Altar (1982–1987) Became Altar Boy of 5 years at St. John the Baptist Parish Church, San Juan City
- Vice President – Katipunan ng mga Artistang Pilipino sa Pelikula at Telebisyon (KAPPT) or Philippine Cinema & Television Actors Guild, Inc. (1999–2002)
- Member – Rotary Club of Pagsanjan, Laguna
- Member – Carpa Club of Pagsanjan, Laguna
- National Presidential Adviser on Servant Leadership – The Fraternal Order of Eagles – Philippine Eagles (TFOEPE)

== Filmography ==
=== Film ===
| Year | Title | Role |
|---|---|---|
| 1985 | Mga Paru-Parong Bukid | Senen's brother |
| 1985 | Haunted House | |
| 1986 | Bagets Gang | |
| 1986 | Bukas ng Sabo Agi Buka sa Sabitan | |
| 1986 | Kapitan Pablo: Cavite Killing Fields | Kapitan Pablo's son |
| 1987 | Humanda Ka, Ikaw ang Sumuko | |
| 1987 | Target: Sparrow Unit | |
| 1987 | Boy Tornado | Boy's friend |
| 1988 | Dongalo Massacre | |
| 1988 | Lost Command | |
| 1988 | Tumayo Ka't... Lumaban | |
| 1988 | Alega Gang: Public Enemy No.1 of Cebu | Alega Gang member |
| 1988 | Ambush | |
| 1988 | Ang Supremo | |
| 1988 | Kumander Dante | |
| 1988 | Kumakasa... Kahit Nag-iisa | |
| 1988 | Kamandag ng Dagat | |
| 1989 | Alex Boncayao Brigade | Rudy |
| 1989 | Kontra Puwersa | |
| 1989 | Eagle Squad | Jet Espino |
| 1989 | Isang Bala, Isang Buhay | Ex-commando |
| 1989 | Bala... Dapat Kay Cris Cuenca (Public Enemy No.1 of Region 4) | |
| 1989 | Moises Platon | |
| 1989 | Gapos Gang | |
| 1990 | Kakampi Ko ang Diyos | |
| 1990 | Asiong Salonga: Hari ng Tondo, 1950 | Asiong Salonga |
| 1990 | Urbanito Dizon: The Most Notorious Gangster in Luzon | Apache Gang member |
| 1990 | Ibabaon Kita sa Lupa | |
| 1990 | Hanggang Saan ang Tapang Mo? | Greg |
| 1990 | Hukom. 45 | |
| 1990 | Hulihin si... Boy Amores | |
| 1990 | Alyas Pogi: Birador ng Nueva Ecija | Emilio Mallari (Air-Con Gang member) |
| 1990 | Inosente | |
| 1991 | Leon ng Maynila: P/Col. Romeo B. Maganto, WPD-MPFF | Roger |
| 1991 | Mayor Latigo: Ang Barakong Alkalde ng Baras | |
| 1991 | Captain Jaylo: Batas sa Batas | Dodong Sanggano |
| 1991 | OXO vs Sigue-Sigue | |
| 1992 | Eddie Tagalog: Pulis Makati | |
| 1992 | Task Force Habagat | Alfredo "Joey" de Leon |
| 1993 | Manila Boy | Ragoy's henchmen no.2 |
| 1993 | Sala sa Init, Sala sa Lamig | Drug pusher |
| 1993 | Manchichiritchit | |
| 1993 | Bukas... Tatakpan Ka ng Dyaryo! | |
| 1994 | Epimaco Velasco: NBI | one of the Big-4 Man (cameo appearance) |
| 1995 | The Four Stooges | Stanley |
| 1995 | Hatulan: Bilibid Boys II | |
| 1995 | Ang Titser Kong Pogi | Emilio the backdiving thug |
| 1995 | Kahit Harangan ng Bala | Jigo Almonte |
| 1995 | Mano Mano | |
| 1996 | Balawis | |
| 1996 | Kristo | St. Matthew |
| 1996 | Batang Z | |
| 1996 | Bossing | |
| 1996 | Hagedorn | Totoy |
| 1996 | Totoy Hitman (Batas Ko ang Hahatol) | Ismael "Mael" Rivero |
| 1997 | Extranghero | Dr. Ivan |
| 1997 | Pag-Ibig Ko sa Iyo'y Totoo | Mr. Diaz's son |
| 1997 | Babasaging Kristal | |
| 1997 | Yes Darling: Walang Matigas Na Pulis 2 | Kidnapper |
| 1998 | Tuloy! Bukas ang Pinto! | |
| 1998 | Ang Maton at ang Showgirl | Valdez |
| 1998 | Pakawalang Puso | |
| 1998 | Birador | Bank hold-up gang member |
| 1998 | Jesus Salonga, Alyas Boy Indian | |
| 1998 | Cariño Brutal | |
| 1998 | Notoryus | |
| 1998 | Tulak ng Bibig, Kabig ng Dibdib | |
| 1998 | Hiwaga ng Panday | |
| 1999 | Type Kita... Walang Kokontra! | Tong |
| 1999 | Mamang Shotgun | Wilfredo |
| 1999 | Abel Villarama: Armado | |
| 2000 | Makamandag Na Bala | |
| 2002 | Huwag Mong Takasan ang Batas | Melchor |
| 2005 | Exodus: Tales from the Enchanted Kingdom | Magkal |
| 2009 | Ang Panday | Apoykatawan |
| 2010 | Si Agimat at si Enteng Kabisote | Ragat |
| 2011 | Manila Kingpin: The Asiong Salonga Story | Nicasio "Asiong" Salonga |
| 2012 | This Guy's in Love with U Mare! | |
| 2012 | El Presidente | General Emilio Aguinaldo |
| 2013 | Boy Golden | Arturo "Boy Golden" Porcuna |
| 2014 | Muslim Magnum .357: To Serve and Protect | Lt. Jamal Razul |
| 2023 | Imelda Papin: The Untold Story | Ferdinand Marcos |
| TBA | Malvar: Tuloy ang Laban | Emilio Aguinaldo |
| TBA | Oplan Exodus: SAF 44 – For God and Country | TBA |

=== Television ===
| Year | Title | Role |
|---|---|---|
| 1985–1987 | Heredero | recurring role |
| 2000 | IBC Headliners | news anchor |
| 2021 | FPJ'S Ang Probinsyano | guest cast |
| 2023 | Walang Matigas na Pulis sa Matinik na Misis | Juancho "Kamao" Dehado a.k.a. Scarface |
| 2023 | Maging Sino Ka Man | Boss Frank |

== Awards ==
| Year | Award-Giving Body | Category | Work | Result |
|---|---|---|---|---|
| 2011 | 37th Metro Manila Film Festival | Best Festival Actor | Manila Kingpin: The Asiong Salonga Story | Nominated |
| 2011 | 37th Metro Manila Film Festival | Male Sexiest Appeal Celebrity of the Night | – | Won |
| 2012 | GMMSF Box-Office Entertainment Awards | Outstanding Government Service Award | – | Won |
| 2012 | 28th PMPC Star Awards for Movies | Movie Actor of the Year | Manila Kingpin: The Asiong Salonga Story | Won tied with (Aga Muhlach) |
| 2012 | 28th PMPC Star Awards for Movies | Male Star with Radiant Skin | – | Won |
| 2012 | 14th Gawad PASADO Awards | PinakaPasadong Aktor | Manila Kingpin: The Asiong Salonga Story | Won |
| 2012 | 60th FAMAS Awards | Best Actor | Manila Kingpin: The Asiong Salonga Story | Won |
| 2012 | 30th FAP Luna Awards | Best Actor | Manila Kingpin: The Asiong Salonga Story | Won |
| 2012 | 38th Metro Manila Film Festival | Best Festival Actor | El Presidente | Nominated |
| 2013 | 29th PMPC Star Awards for Movies | Movie Actor of the Year | El Presidente | Won |
| 2013 | 15th Gawad PASADO Awards | PinakaPasadong Aktor | El Presidente | Won |
| 2013 | 61st FAMAS Awards | Best Actor | El Presidente | Won |
| 2013 | 39th Metro Manila Film Festival | Best Festival Actor | Boy Golden | Nominated |
| 2014 | 30th PMPC Star Awards for Movies | Movie Actor of the Year | Boy Golden | Nominated |
| 2014 | 62nd FAMAS Awards | Best Actor | Boy Golden | Won |
| 2015 | 63rd FAMAS Awards | Best Actor | Muslim Magnum .357: To Serve and Protect | Nominated |
