= 2013 Laguna local elections =

Philippine election

2013 Laguna gubernatorial election
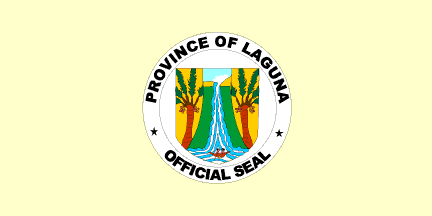
- May 13, 2013
- Gubernatorial election
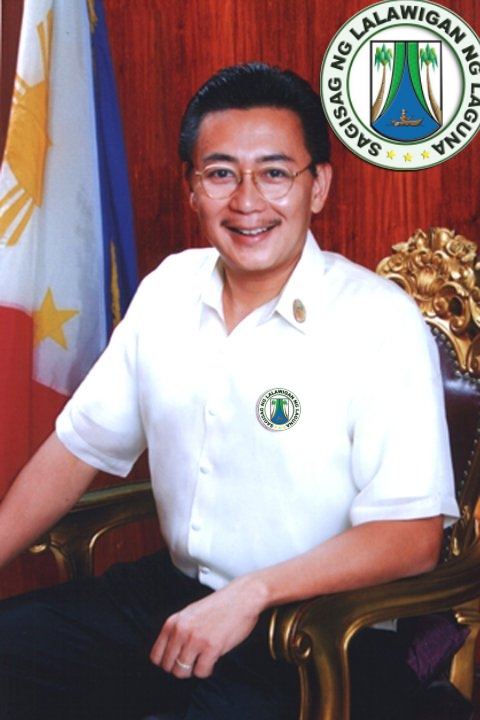

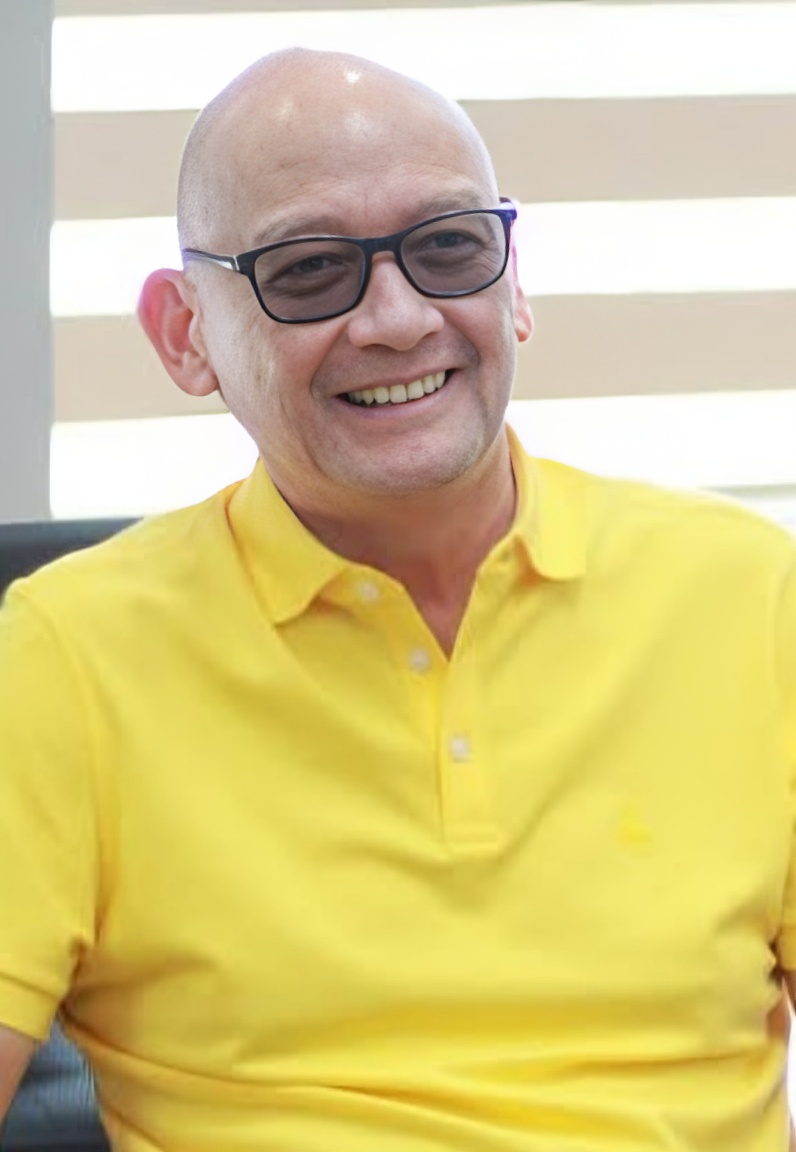
Nominee	E. R. Ejercito	Edgar San Luis
Party	UNA	Liberal
Running mate	Dante Amante	Celso "Soy" Mercado
Popular vote	461,198	398,807
Percentage	53.63	46.37
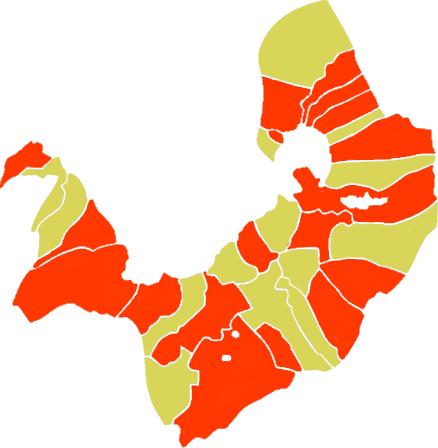
- Result of the Gubernatorial election by Cities/Municipalities
- Vice gubernatorial election
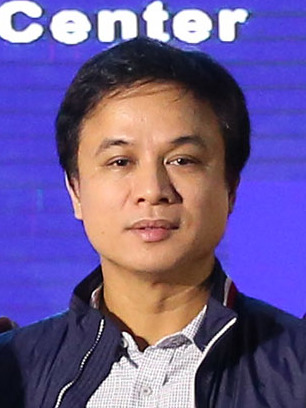
Nominee	Ramil Hernandez	Celso "Soy" Mercado
Party	Nacionalista	Liberal
Popular vote	434,405	181,771
Percentage	56.75	23.75
Governor before election
E. R. Ejercito
UNA
Elected Governor
E. R. Ejercito
UNA

Local elections were held in the Province of Laguna on May 13, 2013 as part of the 2013 general election. Voters elected candidates for all local positions: a municipal/city mayor, vice mayor and town councilors, as well as members of the Sangguniang Panlalawigan, the vice-governor, governor and representatives for the four districts of Laguna.

== Candidates ==
UNA / PDP–Laban Bagong Laguna Una Sa Lahat
Name	Party	Result
For Governor
E.R Ejercito	UNA	Won
For Vice Governor
Dante Amante	UNA	Lost
1st District
For House Of Representative
Gat Alatiit	PDP–Laban	Lost
For Board Member
Gab Alatiit	UNA	Lost
Gherome Ejercito	UNA	Lost
Emilio Tiongco	UNA	Won
2nd District
For House Of Representative
Teresita Lazaro	PDP–Laban	Lost
For Board Member
Neptali Bagnes	UNA	Won
Neil Nocon	UNA	Lost
Juan Unico	UNA	Won
3rd District
For House of Representatives
Sol Aragones	UNA	Won
For Board Member
Angelica Jones	UNA	Won
Dennis Padilla	UNA	Lost
4th District
For House Of Representative
Benidicto Palacol Jr.	PDP–Laban	Lost
For Board Member
Gerald Ejercito	UNA	Lost

Liberal Party Team PNoy Laguna
Name	Party	Result
For Governor
Edgar San Luis	Liberal	Lost
For Vice Governor
Soy Mercado	Liberal	Lost
1st District
For House Of Representative
Dan Fernandez	Liberal	Won
For Board Member
Carlo Almoro	Liberal	Won
Emilio Garcia	Liberal	
2nd District
For House Of Representative
Jun Chipeco	Liberal	
For Board Member
Guillermo Belarmino, Jr.	Liberal	Lost
Purisino Oruga	Liberal	Won
Susano Tapia	Liberal	Lost
3rd District
For House Of Representative
Maria Evita Arago	Liberal	Lost
For Board Member
Earl John Isleta	Liberal	Lost
Marina Paras	Liberal	Lost
4th District
For House Of Representative
Benjamin Agarao Jr.	Liberal	Won
For Board Member
Benjo Agarao	Liberal	Won
Abiel Panganiban	Liberal	Lost

Nacionalista Party
Name	Party	Result
For Vice Governor
Ramil Hernandez	Nacionalista	Won
1st District
For Board Member
Dave Almarinez	Nacionalista	Won
3rd District
For Board Member
Richard Pavico	Nacionalista	Lost
4th District
For House Of Representative
Antonio Carolino	Nacionalista	Lost

== Provincial elections ==
=== Partial Unofficial results from COMELEC ===
Partial Unofficial Tally as of 2013-05-24 09:17:41

=== Gubernatorial election ===
E.R. Ejercito is the incumbent, incumbent 4th district Rep. Edgar San Luis is his primary opponent.

Laguna gubernatorial election
Party	Candidate	Votes	%
UNA	E.R. Ejercito	566,325	55.47
Liberal	Edgar San Luis	454,633	44.53
Total votes		1,020,958	100
UNA hold			

=== Vice-gubernatorial election ===
Caesar Perez is the incumbent and is running for Mayor of Los Baños, Laguna. Former Vice Governor Ramil Hernandez running this place his opponent is Celso Mercado and Incumbent Councilor of San Pablo City and PCL Laguna President Dante Amante the brother of Incumbent Mayor Vicente Amante.

- Laguna Vice-gubernatorial election
  Party	Candidate	Votes	%
  Nacionalista	Ramil Hernandez	434,405	56.75
  Liberal	Celso "Soy" Mercado	181,771	23.75
  UNA	Dante Amante	149,331	19.51
  Total votes		923,377	100
  Nacionalista gain from Akbayan			

== Congressional elections ==
=== 1st District ===
Danilo Fernandez is the incumbent.

2013 Philippine House of Representatives election at Laguna's 1st district
Party	Candidate	Votes	%
Liberal	Dan Fernandez	131,384	75.15
PDP–Laban	Gat-Ala Alatiit, Jr.	43,441	24.85
Total votes		207,542	100
Liberal hold			

=== 2nd District ===
Incumbent Timmy Chipeco is term limited; his father, Calamba mayor Jun Chipeco, Jr., is his party's nominee. His opponent is former governor Teresita Lazaro.

2013 Philippine House of Representatives election at Laguna's 2nd district
Party	Candidate	Votes	%
Liberal	Joaquin Chipeco, Jr.	168,010	61.48
PDP–Laban	Teresita Lazaro	105,253	38.52
Total votes		301,490	100
Liberal hold			

=== 3rd District ===
Maria Evita Arago is the incumbent for her 3rd and last term. She will oppose former ABS-CBN News anchor/reporter Sol Aragones and campaign coordinator and former Vice Mayor of San Pablo City Laguna Celia Counducto-Lopez.

2013 Philippine House of Representatives election at Laguna's 3rd district
Party	Candidate	Votes	%
UNA	Sol Aragones-Sampelo	92,273	50.58
Liberal	Maria Evita Arago	81,764	44.82
PDP–Laban	Celia Lopez	8,386	4.60
Total votes		195,772	100
UNA gain from Liberal			

=== 4th District ===
Incumbent Edgar San Luis is running for governor. His party, the Liberal Party, nominates former Rep. Benjamin Agarao Jr.

2013 Philippine House of Representatives election at Laguna's 4th district
Party	Candidate	Votes	%
Liberal	Benjamin Agarao Jr.	91,530	46.28
Nacionalista	Antonio Carolino	79,531	40.21
PDP–Laban	Benedicto Palacol, Jr.	26,709	13.51
Total votes		219,171	100
Liberal hold			

== Provincial Board elections ==
All 4 Districts of Laguna will elect Sangguniang Panlalawigan or provincial board members.

=== 1st District ===
- Cities: Biñan, Santa Rosa City, San Pedro City

Parties are as stated in their certificate of candidacies.

Laguna 1st District Sangguniang Panlalawigan election
Party	Candidate	Votes	%
Nacionalista	Dave Almarinez	93,316	21.20
Liberal	Carlo Almoro	81,877	18.60
UNA	Emilio Tiongco	71,283	16.20
UNA	Gabnulang Alatiit	70,990	16.13
Liberal	Godofredo "Emilio" Garcia	69,949	15.89
UNA	Gherome Eric Ejercito	52,691	11.97
Total votes		207,542	100

=== 2nd District ===
- Cities: Cabuyao, Calamba
- Municipality: Bay, Los Baños

Parties are as stated in their certificate of candidacies.

Laguna 2nd District Sangguniang Panlalawigan election
Party	Candidate	Votes	%
UNA	Neptali Bagnes	126,363	21.02
Liberal	Pursino Oruga	123,289	20.51
UNA	Juan Unico	111,555	18.56
UNA	Neil Andrew Nocon	93,944	15.63
Liberal	Guillermo Belarmino, Jr.	72,961	12.14
Liberal	Susano Tapia	54,485	9.07
Independent	Angelito Caldeo	18,428	3.07
Total votes		300,317	100

=== 3rd District ===
- Cities: San Pablo City
- Municipality: Alaminos, Calauan, Liliw. Nagcarlan, Rizal, Victoria

Parties are as stated in their certificate of candidacies.

Laguna 3rd District Sangguniang Panlalawigan election
Party	Candidate	Votes	%
Independent	Katherine Agapay	113,557	37.38
UNA	Angelica Jones Alarva	70,313	23.14
Independent	Levi Agustin	40,825	13.44
UNA	Dennis Esteban Baldivia	38,857	12.79
Nacionalista	Richard Pavico	30,401	10.01
Liberal	Earl John Isleta	8,601	2.83
Liberal	Marina Paras	1,274	0.42
Total votes		195,772	100

=== 4th District ===
- Municipalities: Cavinti, Famy, Kalayaan, Luisiana, Lumban, Mabitac, Magdalena, Majayjay, Paete, Pagsanjan, Pakil, Pangil, Pila, Santa Cruz, Santa Maria, Siniloan

Parties are as stated in their certificate of candidacies.

Laguna 4th District Sangguniang Panlalawigan election
Party	Candidate	Votes	%
Liberal	Joseph Kris Benjamin Agarao	112,301	35.90
Independent	Rai-ann Agustine San Luis	90,714	29.00
Liberal	Ambiel John Panganiban	54,196	17.33
UNA	George Gerald Ejercito	49,373	15.78
Independent	Ronald Allan Sarmiento	6,224	1.99
Total votes		219,678	100

== City and municipal elections ==
All municipalities of Laguna, Biñan, Cabuyao, Calamba, San Pablo City, and Santa Rosa City will elect mayor and vice-mayor this election. The candidates for mayor and vice mayor with the highest number of votes wins the seat; they are voted separately, therefore, they may be of different parties when elected. Below is the list of mayoralty candidates of each city and municipalities per district.

=== 1st District ===
- Cities: Biñan, Santa Rosa City, San Pedro City

==== Biñan ====
Biñan mayoralty election
Party	Candidate	Votes	%
Liberal	Marlyn Alonte	25,935	76.63
Independent	Joaquin Borja	7,057	20.85
NPC	Reynaldo Cardeño	851	2.51
Total votes		33,843	100

Biñan vice mayoralty election
Party	Candidate	Votes	%
Liberal	Walfredo Dimaguila, Jr.	19,426	57.43
UNA	Rene Manabat	14,397	42.57
Total votes		33,823	100

==== Santa Rosa ====
Santa Rosa City mayoralty election
Party	Candidate	Votes	%
Liberal	Arlene Arcillas	179,700	59.22
PDP–Laban	Alicia Lazaga	133,704	40.78
Margin of victory		45,996	18.44
Total votes		303 404	100
Liberal hold			

Santa Rosa City vice mayoralty election
Party	Candidate	Votes	%
Liberal	Arnel Gomez	35,808	44.84
PDP–Laban	Jose Catindig, Jr.	26,223	32.83
LDP	Manuel Alipon	17,835	22.33
Margin of victory		9,585	12
Total votes		79,866	100
Liberal hold			

==== San Pedro City ====
San Pedro City mayoralty election
Party	Candidate	Votes	%
Nacionalista	Lourdes S. Cataquiz	60,561	62.87
Liberal	Norvic D. Solidum	32,223	35.53
Independent	Berlene Alberto	1,548	1.60
Total votes		96,332	100

San Pedro City vice mayoralty election
Party	Candidate	Votes	%
Nacionalista	Rafael Campos	37,211	38.67
Liberal	Sheriliz Almoro	32,713	34.48
NPC	Melvin Matibag	22,266	23.61
Independent	Ray Michael Junia	1,899	1.99
Independent	Ernesto Remoquillo, Jr.	583	0.63
Independent	Roland De Leon	293	0.33
Independent	Lito Patromo	290	0.30
Total votes		95,255	100

=== 2nd District ===
- Cities: Cabuyao, Calamba
- Municipality: Bay, Los Baños

==== Cabuyao ====
Cabuyao mayoralty election
Party	Candidate	Votes	%
Nacionalista	Isidro Hemedes, Jr.	51,719	56.65
Liberal	Nila Aguillo	39,578	43.35
Total votes		91,297	100

Cabuyao vice mayoralty election
Party	Candidate	Votes	%
Nacionalista	Rommel Gecolea	46,619	52.35
Liberal	Ma. Wanda Alimagno	42,435	47.65
Total votes		89,054	100

==== Calamba ====
Calamba mayoralty election
Party	Candidate	Votes	%
Nacionalista	Justin Marc SB. Chipeco	66,802	49.54
PDP–Laban	Severino Lajara	63,145	46.82
Makabayan	Joel Paner	4,676	3.47
Independent	Lito Teves	234	0.17
Total votes		140,823	100

Calamba vice mayoralty election
Party	Candidate	Votes	%
Nacionalista	Roseller Rizal	67,278	53.67
PDP–Laban	Angelito Lazaro, Jr.	58,078	46.33
Total votes		140,846	100

==== Bay ====
Bay mayoralty election
Party	Candidate	Votes	%
Independent	Bruno Ramos	18,291	100
Total votes		18,291	100
Independent hold			

Bay vice mayoralty election
Party	Candidate	Votes	%
Independent	Soriano Escueta	16,429	100
Total votes		16,429	100
Independent hold			

==== Los Baños ====
In a bid for the mayoralty, Incumbent Vice Governor Caesar Perez faces off against Incumbent Mayor Anthony Genuino, Former Mayor Francisco Lapis, Marcelino de Guzman and Juan Leron

Los Baños mayoralty election
Party	Candidate	Votes	%
Akbayan	Caesar Perez	17,200	43.01
UNA	Anthony Genuino	14,825	37.07
Liberal	Francisco Lapis	7,314	18.29
Independent	Marcelino De Guzman	430	1.08
NPC	Juan Leron	226	0.57
Total votes		41,402	100

Los Baños vice mayoralty election
Party	Candidate	Votes	%
Liberal	Procopio Alipon	23,891	63.12%
UNA	Josephine Evangelista	13,957	36.88
Total votes		41,402	100

=== 3rd District ===
- City: San Pablo City
- Municipality: Alaminos, Calauan, Liliw. Nagcarlan, Rizal, Victoria

==== San Pablo ====
Incumbent Vicente Amante his term-limited his son City Administrator Loreto Amante running for Mayor his opponents is Former City Administrator Atty. Hizon Arago, Incumbent Councilor Angelo Adriano and Former Mayor and Congressman in 3rd district Florante Aquino.

San Pablo City mayoralty election
Party	Candidate	Votes	%
UNA	Loreto Amante	59,449	61.06
Liberal	Hizon Arago	17,612	18.09
Independent	Angelo Adriano	12,143	12.47
PDP–Laban	Florante Aquino	8,162	8.38
Total votes		102,373	100

San Pablo City vice mayoralty election
Party	Candidate	Votes	%
UNA	Angelita Yang	39,039	41.50
Liberal	Frederick Martin Ilagan	18,500	19.67
Nacionalista	Alejandro Yu	18,443	19.61
PDP–Laban	Restituto Mendoza	13,337	14.18
Independent	Michael Anthony Potenciano	4,376	4.65
Independent	Edwin Gapunay	373	0.40
Total votes		102,373	100

==== Alaminos ====
Alaminos mayoralty election
Party	Candidate	Votes	%
Liberal	Eladio Magampon	11,160	65.96
UNA	Ramir Sapsa, Jr.	5,760	34.04
Total votes		17,643	100

Alaminos vice mayoralty election
Party	Candidate	Votes	%
UNA	Ruben Alvarez	9,247	56.64
Liberal	Wilson Villanueva	7,078	43.36
Total votes		17,643	100

==== Calauan ====
Calauan mayoralty election
Party	Candidate	Votes	%
UNA	Buenafrido Berris	10,982	53.32
Liberal	June Joseph Brion	9,291	45.11
Independent	Dario Velasco	324	1.57
Total votes		21,855	100

Calauan vice mayoralty election
Party	Candidate	Votes	%
UNA	Allan Jun Sanchez	15,950	100
Total votes		15,950	100
UNA hold			

==== Liliw ====
Liliw mayoralty election
Party	Candidate	Votes	%
Liberal	Ericson Sulibit	9,176	55.23
PDP–Laban	Raymundo Pales	3,949	23.77
UNA	Ma. Ayessa Ticzon	3,489	21.00
Total votes		17,252	100

Liliw vice mayoralty election
Party	Candidate	Votes	%
Liberal	Pablo Orioste	7,151	44.88
PDP–Laban	Jesus Monteiro	6,227	39.08
UNA	Agripina Sulte	2,555	16.04
Total votes		17,252	100

==== Nagcarlan ====
Nagcarlan mayoralty election
Party	Candidate	Votes	%
Liberal	Nelson Osuna	4,322	43.36
UNA	Valentin Castelo	2,850	28.59
PDP–Laban	Eliseo Corsega	2,698	27.07
Independent	Delfin Mojado	98	0.98
Total votes		10,452	100

Nagcarlan vice mayoralty election
Party	Candidate	Votes	%
PDP–Laban	Lourdes Arcasetas	4,937	51.61
Liberal	Brigido Araneta	4,629	48.39
Total votes		10,452	100

==== Rizal ====
Rizal mayoralty election
Party	Candidate	Votes	%
UNA	Antonino Aurelio	5,101	58.08
Liberal	Rolen Urriquia	3,681	41.92
Total votes		8,981	100

Rizal vice mayoralty election
Party	Candidate	Votes	%
UNA	Ferdinand Sumague	4,366	50.35
Liberal	Vener Muñoz	4,305	49.65
Total votes		8,981	100

==== Victoria ====
Victoria mayoralty election
Party	Candidate	Votes	%
Liberal	Raul Gonzales	7,416	44.24
UNA	Francisco Almeida	4,888	29.16
Nacionalista	Dwight Kampitan	4,460	26.60
Total votes		17,216	100

Victoria vice mayoralty election
Party	Candidate	Votes	%
UNA	Florencio Laraño	8,679	53.90
Nacionalista	Wilfredo Herradura	5,027	31.22
Liberal	Saturnino Balagtas	2,396	14.88
Total votes		17,216	100

=== 4th District ===
- Municipality: Cavinti, Famy, Kalayaan, Luisiana, Lumban, Mabitac, Magdalena, Majayjay, Laguna, Paete, Pagsanjan, Pakil, Pangil, Pila, Santa Cruz, Santa Maria, Siniloan

==== Cavinti ====
Cavinti mayoralty election
Party	Candidate	Votes	%
Liberal	Melbert Oliveros	5,864	58.87
UNA	Florcelie Esguerra	4,097	41.13
Total votes		10,135	100

Cavinti vice mayoralty election
Party	Candidate	Votes	%
Liberal	Hermie Titan	4,935	52.49
UNA	Danilo Arroyo	4,466	47.51
Total votes		10,135	100

==== Famy ====
Famy mayoralty election
Party	Candidate	Votes	%
UNA	Renonia Muramatsu	2,773	46.06
Nacionalista	Emmanuel Acomular	2,157	35.83
Independent	Vicente Carlos Llamas VI	1,090	18.11
Total votes		6,242	100

Famy vice mayoralty election
Party	Candidate	Votes	%
UNA	Edwin Pangilinan	3,102	53.48
Nacionalista	Arlando Albay	1,828	31.52
Independent	Lurlenn Melgar	870	15.00
Total votes		6,242	100

==== Kalayaan ====
Kalayaan mayoralty election
Party	Candidate	Votes	%
Nacionalista	Teodoro Adao, Jr.	5,054	52.19
UNA	Dominador Oviso	4,008	41.39
Independent	Antonio Dela Paz	602	6.22
Independent	Ponciano Pasco	19	0.20
Total votes		9,965	100

Kalayaan vice mayoralty election
Party	Candidate	Votes	%
Nacionalista	Russel Laganas	4,697	51.54
UNA	Lysander Magana	4,416	48.46
Total votes		9,965	100

==== Background ====
Incumbent Mayor Manuel Rondilla is term-limited as mayor, his ally incumbent Vice Mayor Crisanto Villamin instead ran as mayor. His main opponents are formner Councilor Nestor Rondilla and former Vice Mayor Alex Noceja.

Luisiana mayoralty election
Party	Candidate	Votes	%
UNA	Nestor Rondilla	4,850	46.54
Liberal	Crisanto Villamin	3,570	34.26
PDP–Laban	Alex Noceja	2,001	19.20
Total votes		10,421	100

Incumbent Vice Mayor Crisanto Villamin ran as Mayor, while incumbent Mayor Manuel Rondilla ran at his place, his main opponent is former councilor Reynaldo Pedron.

Luisiana vice mayoralty election
Party	Candidate	Votes	%
UNA	Reynaldo Pedron	5,663	58.21
Nacionalista	Manuel Rondilla	4,065	41.79
Total votes		9,728	100

==== Lumban ====
Lumban mayoralty election
Party	Candidate	Votes	%
UNA	Reynato Añonuevo	6,463	41.91
Liberal	Niccolo Paraiso	5,925	38.42
Nacionalista	Virgilio Lizo	3,034	19.67
Total votes		15,967	100

Lumban vice mayoralty election
Party	Candidate	Votes	%
UNA	Rolando Ubatay	7,594	50.94
Liberal	Mamerita Lagrosa	5,139	34.47
Nacionalista	Eugenio Magano	2,176	14.60
Total votes		15,967	100

==== Mabitac ====
Mabitac mayoralty election
Party	Candidate	Votes	%
UNA	Ronald Sana	5,175	55.26
Nacionalista	Gerardo Consignado	4,190	44.74
Total votes		9,657	100

Mabitac vice mayoralty election
Party	Candidate	Votes	%
UNA	Alberto Reyes	4,892	55.95
Nacionalista	Jaime San Luis	3,852	44.05
Total votes		9,657	100

==== Magdalena ====
Magdalena mayoralty election
Party	Candidate	Votes	%
Nacionalista	David Aventurado, Jr.	4,745	46.02
Liberal	Teresa Nieva Reodica	2,682	26.01
UNA	Virgilio Sol	2,206	21.39
Independent	Rafael Bueno	587	5.69
Independent	Jocelyn Savio	91	0.88
Total votes		10,815	100

Magdalena vice mayoralty election
Party	Candidate	Votes	%
Liberal	Constancio Burbos	5,648	59.48
UNA	Amado Criste, Jr.	3,848	40.52
Total votes		10,815	100

==== Majayjay ====
Majayjay mayoralty election
Party	Candidate	Votes	%
UNA	Victorino Rodillas	2,707	36.11
PDP–Laban	Antonio Esmaquel Victorino Rodillas	2,200	29.35
Nacionalista	Ana Linda Rosas	1,155	15.41
Liberal	Teofilo Guera	969	12.93
Independent	Bienvenido Cobrado	465	6.20
Total votes		7,840	100

Majayjay vice mayoralty election
Party	Candidate	Votes	%
Nacionalista	Lauro Mentilla	2,216	30.98
PDP–Laban	Ricardo Breganza	1,717	24.00
UNA	Victorino Ronabio	1,706	23.85
Liberal	Avelino Merestela	1,515	21.18
Total votes		7,840	100

==== Paete ====
Paete mayoralty election
Party	Candidate	Votes	%
UNA	Rojilyn Bagabaldo	6,708	60.27
Liberal	Marceliano Cadayona	4,367	39.24
Independent	Theodore Aseoche	55	0.49
Total votes		11,549	100

Paete vice mayoralty election
Party	Candidate	Votes	%
UNA	Aurelio Paraiso	5,617	52.62
Liberal	Emerito Gajitos	5,058	47.38
Total votes		11,549	100

==== Pagsanjan ====
Pagsanjan mayoralty election
Party	Candidate	Votes	%
UNA	Girlie "Maita" Ejercito	11,456	75.16
Liberal	Celso Rivera	3,264	21.41
KKK	Abner Afuang	523	3.43
Total votes		16,156	100

Pagsanjan vice mayoralty election
Party	Candidate	Votes	%
Liberal	Terryl Gamit-Talabong	7,995	54.52
UNA	Fred Capistrano	6,669	45.48
Total votes		16,156	100

==== Pakil ====
Pakil mayoralty election
Party	Candidate	Votes	%
Nacionalista	Vipops Charles Martinez	6,084	63.87
UNA	Alfredo Maray, Jr.	3,442	36.13
Total votes		9,930	100

Pakil vice mayoralty election
Party	Candidate	Votes	%
Nacionalista	Amelita Del Moro	4,791	52.07
UNA	Ariel Fornoles	4,410	47.93
Total votes		9,930	100

==== Pangil ====
Pangil mayoralty election
Party	Candidate	Votes	%
UNA	Jovito Reyes	4,417	51.49
Liberal	Rito Manzana	3,655	42.60
Nacionalista	Genidina Vicuña	454	5.29
Independent	Alfredo Acaylar	53	0.62
Total votes		8,941	100

Pangil vice mayoralty election
Party	Candidate	Votes	%
Liberal	Alberto Astoveza, Jr.	4,322	52.75
UNA	Joselito Pajarillo	3,872	47.52
Total votes		8,941	100

==== Pila ====
Pila mayoralty election
Party	Candidate	Votes	%
Nacionalista	Wilfredo Quiat	10,232	50.59
Liberal	Edgardo Ramos	9,992	49.41
Total votes		20,900	100

Pila vice mayoralty election
Party	Candidate	Votes	%
Liberal	Querubin Relova, Jr.	10,156	53.26
Independent	Zaldy Pantua	8,914	46.74
Total votes		20,900	100

==== Santa Cruz ====
Incumbent Mayor Domingo Panganiban seeks for reelection against Councilor Ramon Tan and former Mayor Ariel Magcalas.

Santa Cruz mayoralty election
Party	Candidate	Votes	%
Liberal	Domingo Panganiban	21,770	54.73
Independent	Ramon Tan	9,187	23.10
UNA	Ariel Magcalas	8,821	22.18
Total votes		41,598	100

Santa Cruz vice mayoralty election
Party	Candidate	Votes	%
Liberal	Louie De Leon	25,909	71.02
Independent	Bryan Lateo	10,571	28.98
Total votes		41,598	100

==== Santa Maria ====
Santa Maria mayoralty election
Party	Candidate	Votes	%
Nacionalista	Cindy Carolino	6,877	57.87
UNA	Josie Cuento	5,007	42.13
Total votes		12,240	100

Santa Maria vice mayoralty election
Party	Candidate	Votes	%
Nacionalista	Virginia Tuazon	5,590	48.97
NPC	Cesar Jumawan	2,546	22.30
UNA	Celestino Magbojos, Jr.	2,325	20.37
Independent	Jose Aguado	700	6.13
Independent	Benedict Real	254	2.23
Total votes		12,240	100

==== Siniloan ====
Siniloan mayoralty election
Party	Candidate	Votes	%
UNA	Eduardo Tibay	8,288	50.42
Liberal	Juanita Acero	8,151	49.58
Total votes		16,990	100

Siniloan vice mayoralty election
Party	Candidate	Votes	%
UNA	Roberto Acoba	8,202	51.57
Liberal	Homer Serrano	7,704	48.43
Total votes		16,990	100

== Aftermath ==
In September 2013, the Commission on Elections ruled that Ejercito was disqualified for overspending during the election, later in May 2014, the En Banc of COMELEC ordered Ejercito to step down from office, but the latter appealed on the Supreme Court to null the COMELEC decision. On May 27, 2014, Ramil Hernandez assumed as Governor of Laguna, while Board Member Atty. Katherine "Karen" Agapay of the 3rd District assumed as Vice Governor. Three days later, Ejercito's uncle, Manila Mayor Joseph Estrada convinced his nephew to step down at the capitol.
