= Joey Lina =

Politician

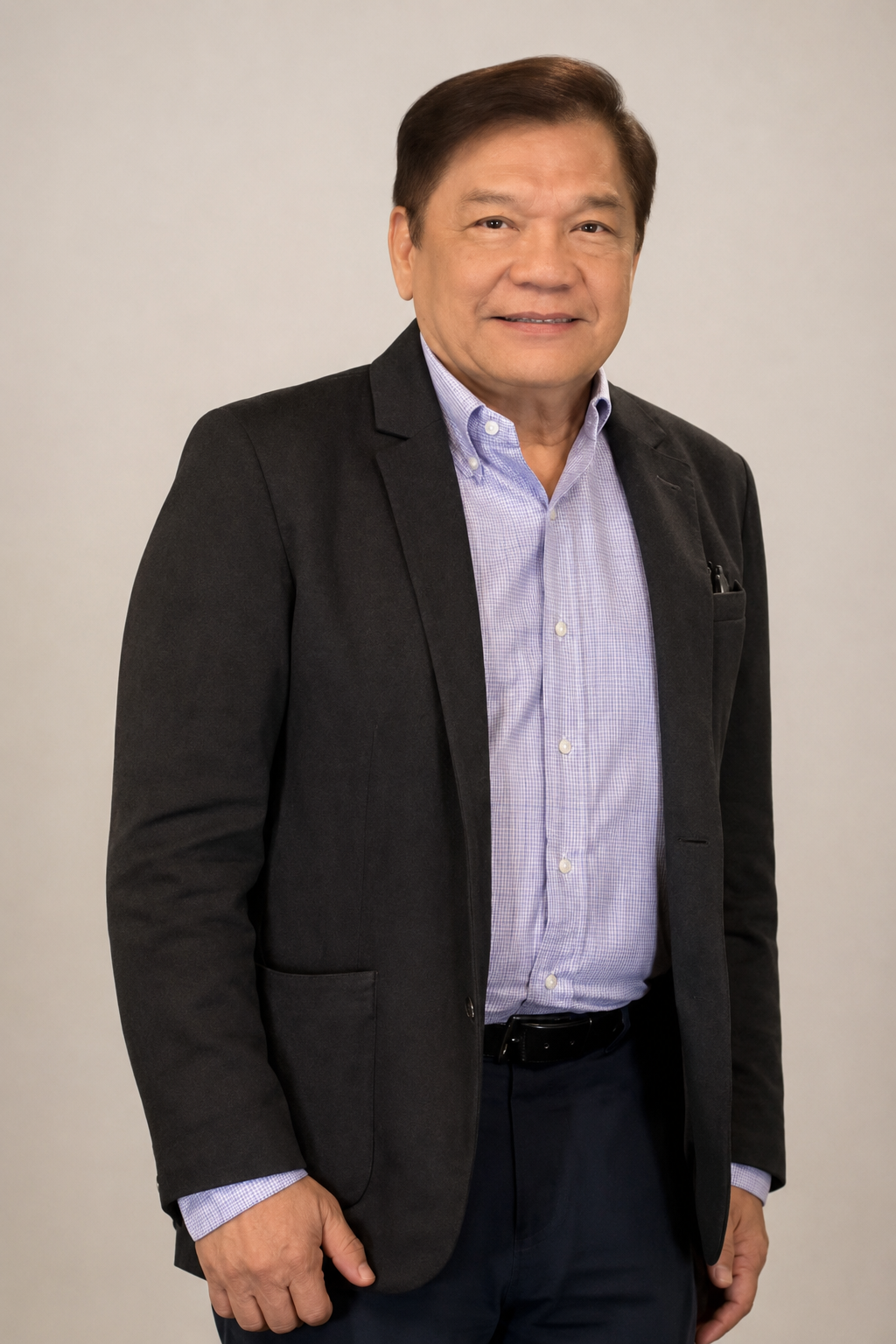

21st Secretary of the Interior and Local Government
- In office January 29, 2001 – July 11, 2004
- President: Gloria Macapagal Arroyo
- Preceded by: Anselmo Avelino Jr. (OIC)
- Succeeded by: Angelo Reyes

15th Governor of Laguna
- In office June 30, 1995 – January 28, 2001
- Vice Governor: Teresita Lazaro
- Preceded by: Restituto Luna
- Succeeded by: Teresita Lazaro

Senator of the Philippines
- In office June 30, 1987 – June 30, 1995

Governor of Metro Manila
- Acting
- In office February 25, 1986 – 1987
- Appointed by: Corazon Aquino
- Preceded by: Imelda Marcos
- Succeeded by: Jejomar Binay (acting)

Personal details
- Born: Jose David Lina Jr. December 22, 1951 (age 74) Victoria, Laguna, Philippines
- Party: Ang Komadrona (2021–present)
- Other political affiliations: Liberal (2009–2010); LDP (1988–2001); UNIDO (1984–1988)
- Spouse: Loretta Atienza
- Children: 6
- Parent: Jose Lina Sr.
- Relatives: Alberto Lina (brother)
- Education: University of Santo Tomas (BA); University of the Philippines Diliman (LL.B.)
- Occupation: Politician, businessman
- Profession: Lawyer Pastor
- Website: https://www.facebook.com/officialjoeylina

Jose "Joey" David Lina Jr., KGCR (born December 22, 1951) is a Filipino lawyer, politician, businessman, public servant, and radio personality who is the former governor of Laguna and former Senator of the Philippines. The youngest Senator during his time at the age of 3. He was the author of the "Lina Law" or Republic Act No. 7279, which decriminalizes squatting in the Philippines. He is currently the President.

== Education ==
Lina attended the University of Santo Tomas and graduated with a Bachelor's degree in Economics in 1975. He would later attend the University of the Philippines College of Law in Diliman, where he would also join the Alpha Phi Beta fraternity in 1977.

== Political career ==
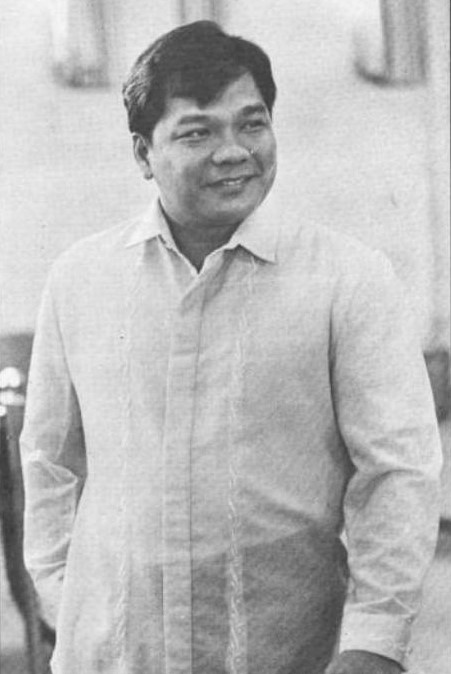
Lina as a senator, photograph released by the Philippine Congress, c. 1988

After Marcos was ousted, Lina was appointed acting Governor of Metro Manila, serving from 1986 to 1987.

During the canvassing of votes in the 1992 election, Lina was present with Ilocos Norte Rep. Roque Ablan Jr. as representatives of presidential candidate Imelda Marcos.

From 1995 to 2001, he served as Governor of Laguna. He was also concurrently the National President of the League of Provinces of the Philippines from 1998 to 2001. Months before the supposed end of his term as Laguna governor, he was then appointed in January 2001 by newly-installed President Gloria Macapagal Arroyo as Secretary of the Interior and Local Government, serving until 2004.
