= Dan Fernandez =

Filipino actor and politician (born 1966)

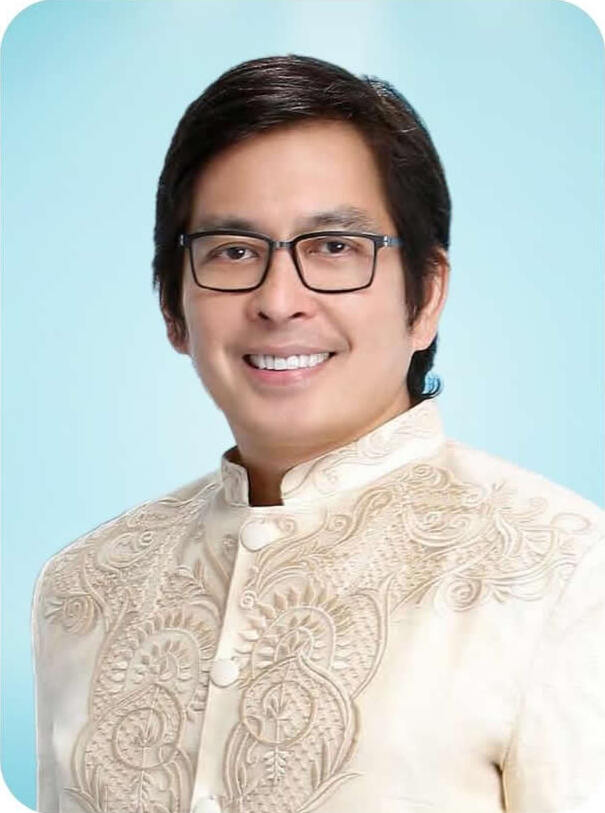
- Official portrait, 2022

Deputy Speaker of the House of Representatives of the Philippines
- In office July 22, 2019 – November 18, 2020
- House Speaker: Alan Peter Cayetano; Lord Allan Velasco

Member of the Philippine House of Representatives
- In office June 30, 2022 – June 30, 2025
- Preceded by: District established
- Succeeded by: Roy Gonzales
- Constituency: Santa Rosa
- In office June 30, 2019 – June 30, 2022
- Preceded by: Arlene Arcillas
- Succeeded by: Ann Matibag
- Constituency: 1st District of Laguna
- In office June 30, 2007 – June 30, 2016
- Preceded by: Uliran Joaquin
- Succeeded by: Arlene Arcillas
- Constituency: 1st District of Laguna

Mayor of Santa Rosa, Laguna
- In office June 30, 2016 – June 30, 2019
- Vice Mayor: Arnold B. Arcillas
- Preceded by: Arlene Arcillas
- Succeeded by: Arlene Arcillas

9th Vice Governor of Laguna
- In office June 30, 2001 – June 30, 2004
- Governor: Teresita Lazaro
- Preceded by: Gat-Ala Alatiit
- Succeeded by: Edwin Olivarez

Member of the Laguna Provincial Board from the 4th District
- In office June 30, 1998 – June 30, 2001

Personal details
- Born: Danilo Ramon Subiaga Fernandez; January 14, 1966 (age 60) Pagsanjan, Laguna, Philippines
- Party: NUP (2020–present)
- Other political affiliations: PDP–Laban (2018–2020); Liberal (2009–2018); Lakas (2007–2009); UNO (2006–2007); PDSP (2003–2006); NPC (until 2003)
- Spouse: Sheila Ysrael
- Children: 3
- Education: Centro Escolar University (OD)
- Occupation: Politician, Actor
- Profession: Optometrist

Danilo Ramon Subiaga Fernandez (born January 14, 1966) is a Filipino politician, actor, businessman, and optometrist who served as the representative of the Lone District of Santa Rosa, Laguna at the House of Representatives of the Philippines from 2022 to 2025. He previously represented the 1st District of Laguna from 2007 to 2016 and again from 2019 to 2022; he also concurrently served as a Deputy Speaker from 2019 to 2020. Prior to his election in the Congress, he served as a board member of Laguna from 1998 to 2001, Vice Governor of Laguna from 2001 to 2004, and Mayor of Santa Rosa from 2016 to 2019. He also ran for governor in 2004 but lost to the incumbent, Teresita Lazaro.

== Early life and education ==
Danilo Ramon Fernandez was born January 14, 1966 in Pagsanjan. He was the youngest of the four children of Edilberto Fernandez Sr., who served as a councilor of Pagsanjan, and Teresita Fernandez. He is related to Estanislao Fernandez, his paternal grandfather's first cousin who served as a lawmaker from Laguna, senator, and Supreme Court associate justice.

He completed his elementary education at Francisco Benitez Memorial School in Pagsanjan, where he earned an honorable mention. He completed his secondary education at Pagsanjan Academy. He was granted a college scholarship at the Centro Escolar University in Manila, where he completed doctor of optometry. He passed the optometry licensure examination in 1986. He then took up law at University of Santo Tomas but later dropped out to pursue an acting career.

== Acting career ==
Dan Fernandez entered show business when he accepted an offer to become an actor in 1986, while he was working out at YMCA of Manila during his law school days. He was known for acting in Mara Clara: The Movie (1996), Balawis (1996), Cobra (1997), Boy Tapang (1999), Upak Gang (2015), and Honor Thy Father (2015).

== Political career ==
Fernandez was first elected as member of the Laguna Provincial Board from the 4th district in 1998, serving for one term until 2001. He was elected vice governor of Laguna in 2001, serving for one term until 2004.

=== 2004 gubernatorial campaign ===
Fernandez chose not to seek re-election for vice governor and instead ran for Governor of Laguna in 2004. He eventually lost to incumbent Governor Teresita Lazaro. He filed a petition to annul Lazaro's proclamation, alleging tampering of election results in Biñan and San Pablo. However, on October 9, 2006, the Commission on Elections (COMELEC) dismissed the petition and denied his motion for reconsideration, due to his failure in filing timely objections and providing evidence of fraud. According to his 2025 Certificate of Candidacy, he transferred his residence to Santa Rosa, Laguna, several months after his vice gubernatorial term ended on June 30, 2004.

=== House of Representatives (2007–2016) ===
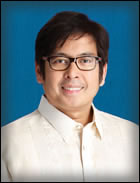
Fernandez official portrait during the 16th Congress

Fernandez decided to return to politics by running for representative of the first district of Laguna in 2007. He won the elections defeating Atty. Nereo Joaquin Jr., the son of former Representatives Nereo and Uliran Joaquin. On November 20, 2009, his election was annulled by the House of Representatives Electoral Tribunal for failing to complete the two-year residency requirement prior to filing his 2007 candidacy but it was reversed by the Supreme Court on January 4, 2010.

Fernandez ran for re-election in 2010 and won defeating his predecessor, Uliran Joaquin. He was once again re-elected in 2013.

As a member of the House of Representatives, Fernandez sponsored and authored 19 House measures. He also co-authored 13 House Bills and Resolutions.

Fernandez served on numerous committees as a member of the Philippine House of Representatives:

- Ecology
- Dangerous Drugs
- Justice
- Labor and Employment
- Public Information
- Public Order and Safety
- Southern Tagalog Development
- Trade and Industry
- Transportation

=== Mayor of Santa Rosa (2016–2019) ===
Upon being term-limited as representative, Fernandez ran for Mayor of Santa Rosa, Laguna in 2016. He won the elections, defeating two opponents and effectively switching places with Arlene Arcillas. However, in 2019, he decided not to seek re-election to seek a comeback to the Congress instead.

=== House of Representatives (2019–2025) ===
Fernandez was elected to his fourth term as Representative of the 1st District of Laguna, without having any opponents in 2019. He switched places with Arlene Arcillas once again. He was then named as one of the Deputy Speakers under the new Speakership of Alan Peter Cayetano. He is one of the 70 congressmen who voted against the renewal of the ABS-CBN franchise. His vote of denial to his former home network's hopes of renewing its legislative franchise sparked controversy from both the entertainment industry and the social media, branding him as a "traitor".

Fernandez was removed as the Deputy Speaker on November 18, 2020. In January 2021, Fernandez is announced to be part of the new bloc "BTS sa Kongreso" (named after the K-pop boy band group BTS of South Korea), a coalition group formed by Alan Peter Cayetano during the 18th Congress.

Fernandez sought re-election in 2022, this time for the newly established lone district of Santa Rosa. He was elected, making him the first representative of the new district. In the 19th Congress, he was named as the chairman of the House Committee on Public Order and Safety, making him a concurrent member of the National Security Council. He also chaired the Quad Committee, alongside Benny Abante (Manila–6th), which investigates the alleged extrajudicial killings during the drug war under former President Rodrigo Duterte, until both resigned as chairmen in November 2024 after former Mandaluyong City Police Chief Hector Grijaldo accused them of pressuring him to admit the existence of the drug war reward system. In January 2025, an ethics complaint was filed by Ferdinand Topacio, lawyer of Cassandra Ong, against Fernandez. The complaint alleged conduct unbecoming of a legislator and Quad Committee chairman, citing violations of the Code of Conduct during hearings on Philippine Offshore Gaming Operators (POGOs) and calling for Fernandez's expulsion.

=== 2025 gubernatorial campaign ===
Fernandez chose not to run for re-election to run in the House and ran instead for governor of Laguna for the second time in 2025. He chose fellow celebrity Gem Castillo as his vice gubernatorial running mate. On April 25, 2025, the Commission on Elections (COMELEC) Kontra Bigay committee issued show-cause order to Fernandez over alleged vote buying activities surrounding his campaign. Fernandez later lost the race to former Laguna 3rd district representative Sol Aragones, placing third.

== Filmography ==
Year	Title	Role	Note(s)	Ref(s).
1989	Gapos Gang			
1989	Babayaran Mo ng Dugo	Nelson's friend		
1990	Kasalanan ang Buhayin Ka	Ding		
1990	Mana sa Ina			
1990	Machete: Istatwang Buhay			
1990	Hindi Laruan ang Puso			
1991	Ang Katawan ni Sofia			
1991	Alyas Dodong Guwapo			
1992	Paminsan-minsan			
1992	Tondo: Libingan ng mga Siga			
1993	Teacher...Teacher I Love You			
1993	Parañaque Bank Robbery (Joselito Joseco Story)	Mojica's Gang member		
1993	Dodong Armado			
1994	Tinyente Saplan: Walang Kasukat sa Tapang		Hong Kong title: Deadly Target	
1994	Bratpack (Mga Pambayad Atraso)			
1995	Alfredo Lim: Batas ng Maynila			
1995	Silakbo	Mario Felix		
1995	Barkada, Walang Atrasan			
1995	Kakaibang Karisma			
1996	Mainit sa Laban... Renegade Soldiers			
1996	Huling Sagupaan			
1996	Balawis			
1996	Mara Clara: The Movie			
1996	Init sa Tag-ulan			
1997	Jacob C.I.S.			
1997	Huwag Mo Nang Itanong			
1997	Tapang sa Tapang			
1997	Cobra			
1997	Bawal Mahalin, Bawal Ibigin			
1997	Bandido			
1997	Padre Kalibre			
1998	Kahit Mabuhay Kang Muli			
1998	Sige, Subukan Mo	Jake		
1999	Boy Tapang			
2001	Cool Dudes			
2009	Ang Panday	Chieftain		
2015	Upak Gang			
2015	Honor Thy Father	Manny		
2019	Santigwar	Mang Nano		

== Personal life ==
Fernandez is married to actress Sheila Ysrael. His son Danzel Rafter had served as a board member of Laguna from the 1st district from 2022 to 2025 and unsuccessfully ran for Santa Rosa representative in 2025.

Global Aero Bleu Corporation, partially (10%) owned by Fernandez, was accused of failing to settle a debt by Fly Noor, which filed a US$751,536.84 claim against it on November 5, 2023 regarding aircraft lease.

House of Representatives of the Philippines
Preceded by Uliran Joaquin	Member of the Philippine House of Representatives from Laguna's 1st District; 2007–2016	Succeeded by Arlene Arcillas
Preceded by Arlene Arcillas	Member of the Philippine House of Representatives from Laguna's 1st District; 2019–2022	Succeeded by Ann Matibag
New district	Member of the Philippine House of Representatives from Santa Rosa's Lone District; 2022–2025	Succeeded by Roy Gonzales
Political offices
Preceded by Gat-Ala Alatiit	Vice Governor of Laguna; 2001–2004	Succeeded by Edwin Olivarez
Preceded by Arlene Arcillas	Mayor of Santa Rosa, Laguna; 2016–2019	Succeeded by Arlene Arcillas
