= 2025 Santa Cruz, Laguna, local elections =

Part of 2025 Philippine general election

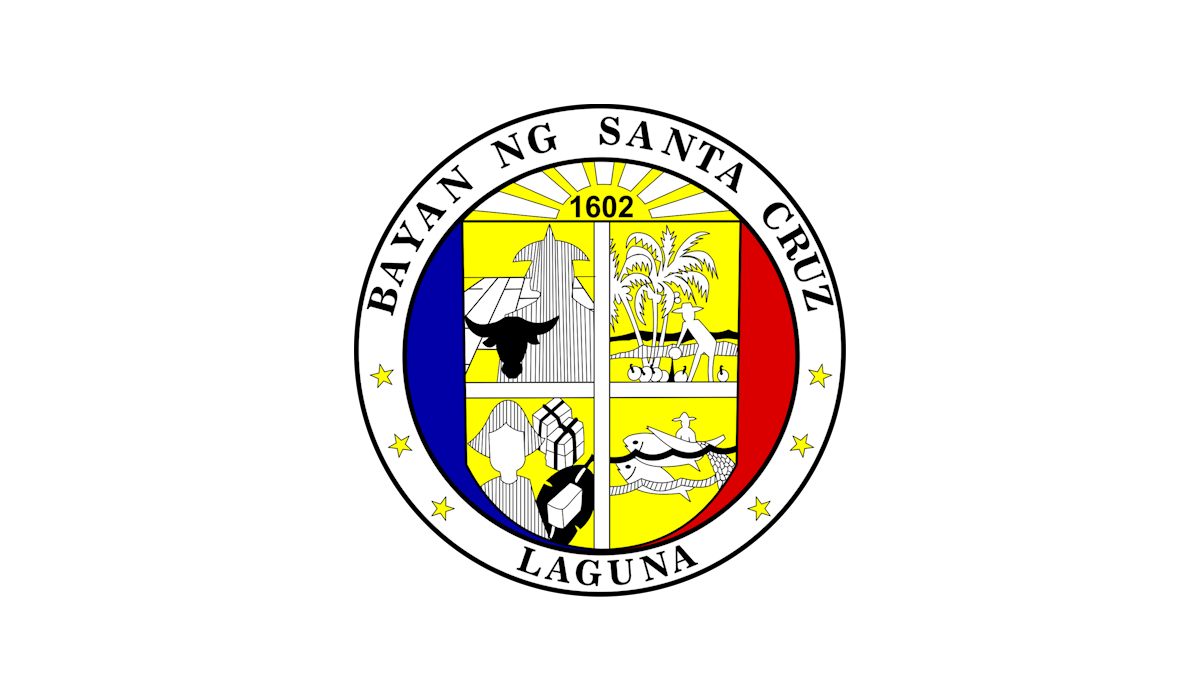
- May 12, 2025
- Mayoral election
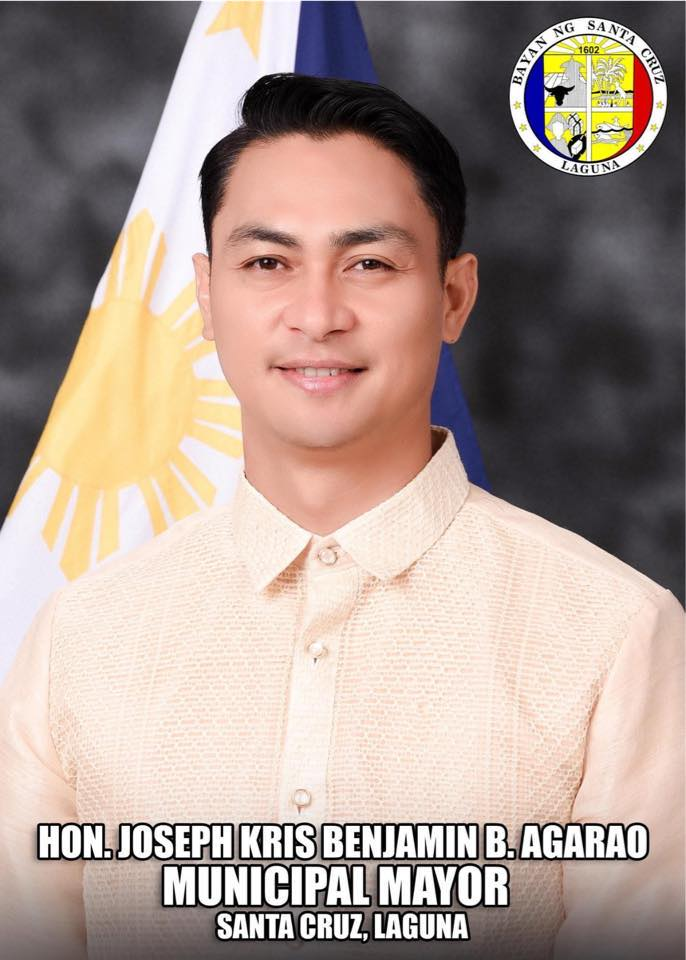

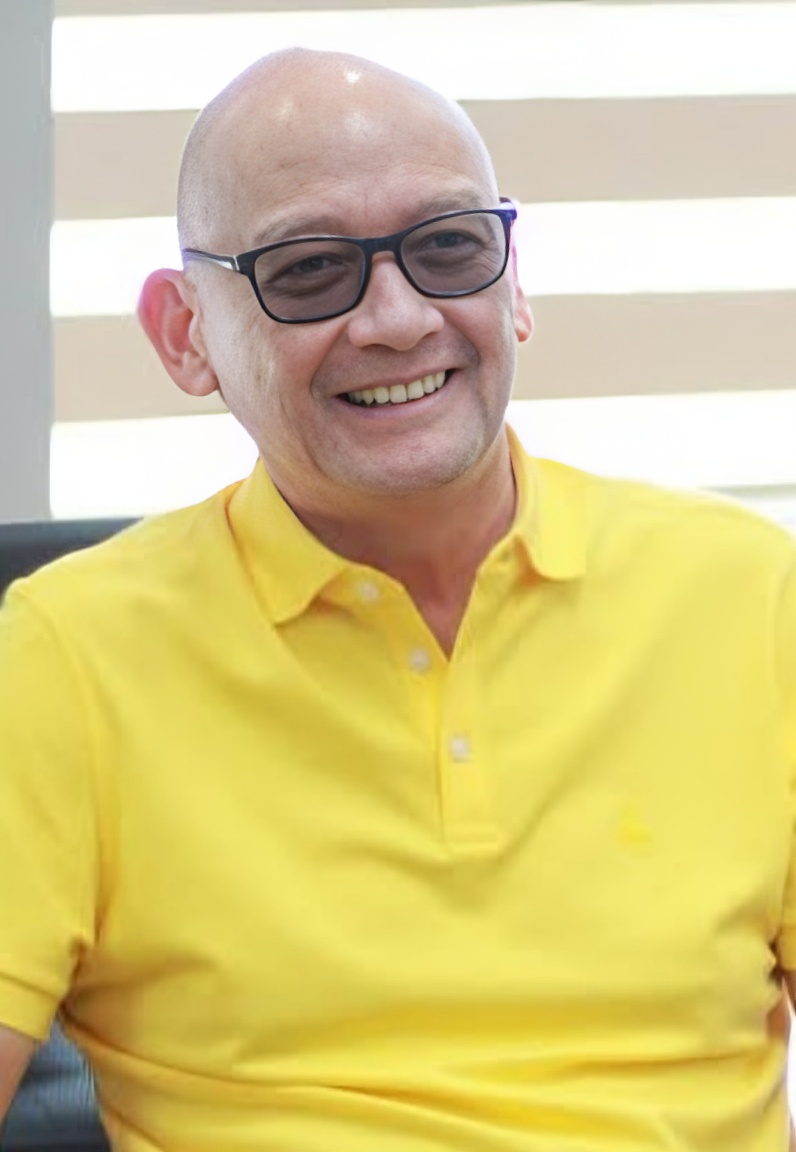
Candidate	Benjo Agarao	Edgar San Luis
Party	PFP	NUP
Running mate	Laarni Malibiran	Laura Obligacion
Incumbent Mayor
Edgar San Luis
Aksyon
- Vice Mayoral election
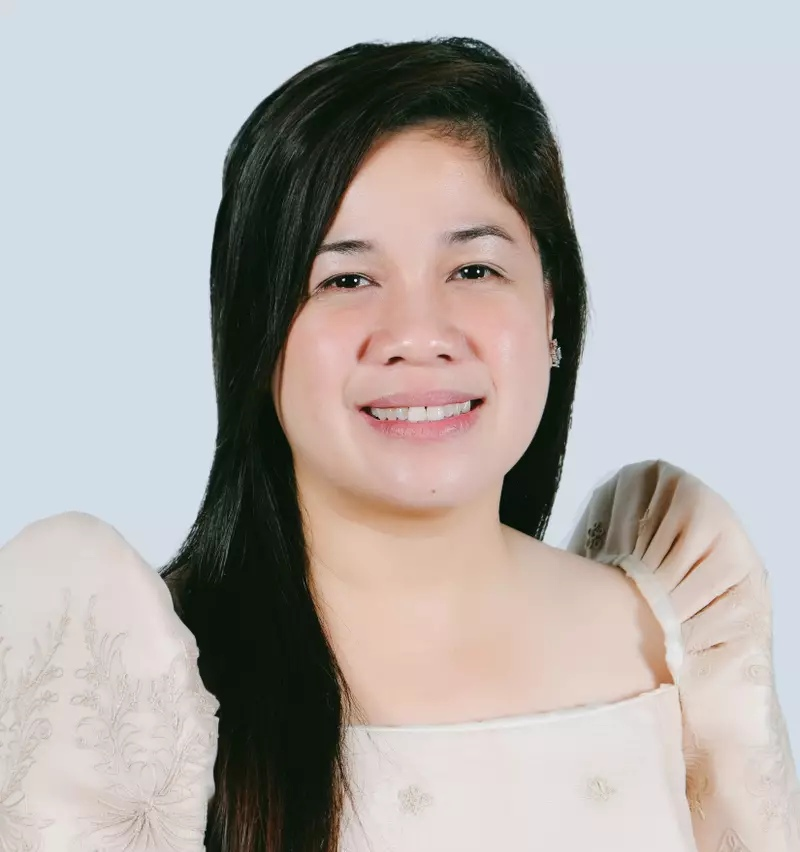

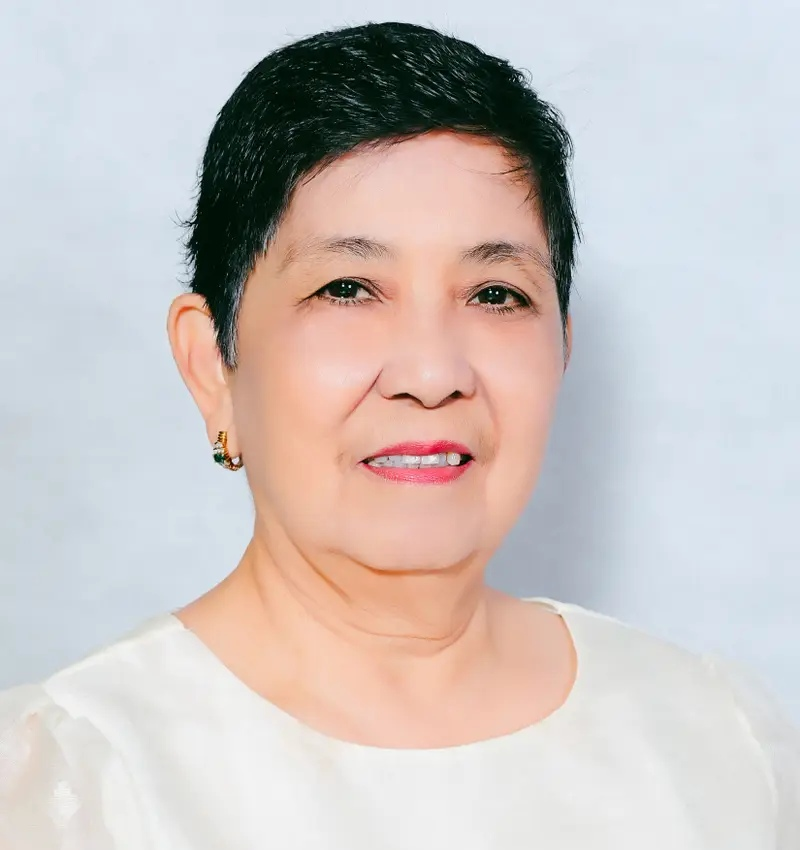
Candidate	Laarni Malibiran	Laura Obligacion
Party	PFP	NUP
Incumbent Vice Mayor
Laarni Malibiran
PROMDI

Local elections were held in Santa Cruz, Laguna, on Monday, May 12, 2025, as part of the Philippine general election. The electorate elected a town mayor, a town vice mayor, eight members of the Sangguniang Bayan, as well as two members of the Sangguniang Panlalawigan, a governor, a vice governor and a representative for the province's fourth congressional district to the House of Representatives. The officials who will be elected in the election will assume their respective offices on June 30, 2025, for a three-year term.

== Background ==
In the 2022 elections, Edgar San Luis and Laarni Malibiran were reelected to the mayoralty and vice mayoralty respectively. San Luis's coalition, Team Serbisyong may Puso, won four seats in the Municipal Council while the opposition, Tropang pang Masa, won three seats.

== Coalitions ==
As the mayor, vice mayor and the members of the Municipal Council are elected on the same ballot. The mayoral candidates may present or endorse a slate of candidates. These slates usually run with their respective mayoral and vice mayoral candidate's along with the other members of their slate. A group of Independent candidates of any mayoral or vice mayoral candidate may also form a slate consisting of themselves.

=== Administration coalition ===
Team Serbisyong may Puso (San Luis–Panganiban)
#	Name	Party
For Mayor
2	Edgar San Luis	NUP
For Vice Mayor
2	Laura Obligacion	NUP
For Councilor
2	Jericho Asinas	NUP
4	Louie De Leon	NUP
13	Mia Martinez	NUP
14	Lucena Odejar	NUP
16	Alan Pamatmat	NUP
18	Ambiel John Panganiban	NUP
19	Anna Clarissa San Luis	NUP
20	Norman Tolentino	NUP

=== Opposition coalition ===
Team Tropa Santa Cruz (Agarao–Malibiran)
#	Name	Party
For Mayor
1	Joseph Kris Benjamin Agarao	PFP
For Vice Mayor
1	Laarni Malibiran	Independent
For Councilor
1	Lea Almarvez	PFP
3	Esmeraldo De Las Armas Jr.	PFP
8	John Mark Garcia	PFP
9	Angelito Joven	PFP
11	Mark Anthony Juangco	PFP
12	Rizaldy Kalaw	PFP
15	Moises Ordoñez	PFP
17	Roselon Pamatmat	PFP

== Mayoral election ==
The incumbent Mayor Edgar San Luis was re-elected in 2022 election with the 50.97% (33,062 votes) of the total votes counted, defeating then-Laguna's 4th District Representative Benjamin Agarao Jr. of PDP–Laban.

=== Candidates ===
==== Declared ====
- Benjo Agarao (PFP), incumbent member of the Laguna Provincial Board
- Edgar San Luis (NUP), incumbent mayor of Santa Cruz

=== Results ===
2025 Santa Cruz Mayoralty election results
Candidate	Party or alliance		Votes	%
Benjo Agarao	Tropa Santa Cruz	PFP	34,944	52.46
Edgar San Luis	Serbisyong may Puso	NUP	31,670	47.54
Total			66,614	100.00
Valid votes			66,614	98.22
Invalid/blank votes			1,206	1.78
Total votes			67,820	100.00
Registered voters/turnout			80,643	84.10
PFP gain from NUP				

== Vice mayoral election ==
The incumbent Vice Mayor Laarni Malibiran was re-elected in 2022 election with the 59.74% (37,099 votes) of the total votes counted, defeating then-councilor and former vice mayor Louie De Leon of Aksyon Demokratiko.

=== Candidates ===
==== Declared ====
- Laura Obligacion (NUP), incumbent member of the Municipal Council and barangay captain of Calios
- Laarni Malibiran (Independent), incumbent vice mayor

=== Results ===
2025 Santa Cruz Vice Mayoralty election results
Candidate	Party or alliance		Votes	%
Laarni Malibiran	Tropa Santa Cruz	Independent	38,004	59.13
Laura Panganiban	Serbisyong may Puso	NUP	26,268	40.87
Total			64,272	100.00
Valid votes			64,272	94.77
Invalid/blank votes			3,548	5.23
Total votes			67,820	100.00
Registered voters/turnout			80,643	84.10
Independent hold				

== Municipal Council election ==
The Santa Cruz Municipal Council is composed of eight councilors elected to serve a three-year term. The election for the council is done via multiple non-transferable vote in which a voter has eight votes to distribute to eight different candidates. The eight candidates with the most votes garnered will be elected to the council.

The incumbent councilors are Ambiel John C. Panganiban, Lea Alagon–Almarves, Norman T. Tolentino, Esmeraldo C. De Las Armas Jr., Rizaldy N. Kalaw, Lucena Rebenque–Odejar and Alan T. Pamatmat. Mark Anthony P. Joven is also an incumbent, but remains in detention after allegations of rape.

=== Results ===
2025 Santa Cruz Municipal Council election results
Candidate	Party or alliance		Votes	%
Ambiel John Panganiban	Serbisyong may Puso	NUP	32,991	7.81
Norman Tolentino	Serbisyong may Puso	NUP	30,780	7.28
Lea Almarvez	Tropa Santa Cruz	PFP	29,370	6.95
Jericho Asinas	Serbisyong may Puso	NUP	27,239	6.44
Roselon Pamatmat	Tropa Santa Cruz	PFP	26,710	6.32
Esmeraldo De Las Armas Jr.	Tropa Santa Cruz	PFP	26,684	6.31
Rizaldy Kalaw	Tropa Santa Cruz	PFP	26,623	6.30
Louie De Leon	Serbisyong may Puso	NUP	26,466	6.26
Anna Clarissa San Luis	Serbisyong may Puso	NUP	25,028	5.92
John Mark Garcia	Tropa Santa Cruz	PFP	24,580	5.82
Alan Pamatmat	Serbisyong may Puso	NUP	22,740	5.38
Mia Martinez	Serbisyong may Puso	NUP	21,443	5.07
Lucena Odejar	Serbisyong may Puso	NUP	21,269	5.03
Angelito Joven	Tropa Santa Cruz	PFP	19,039	4.50
Moises Ordoñez	Tropa Santa Cruz	PFP	15,447	3.65
Efren Diaz	Independent		13,678	3.24
Mark Anthony Juangco	Tropa Santa Cruz	PFP	12,215	2.89
Renato Ernas	Independent		8,922	2.11
Mark Anthony Joven	Independent		7,949	1.88
Santiago Fajilago Jr.	Independent		3,495	0.83
Total			422,668	100.00
Valid votes			422,668	77.90
Invalid/blank votes			119,892	22.10
Total votes			542,560	100.00
Registered voters/turnout			645,144	84.10
