= Agarao =

Agarao is a surname. Notable people with the surname include:

- Benjamin Agarao Jr. (born 1957), Filipino politician and businessman
- Benjo Agarao (born 1979), Filipino businessman and politician
- Jam Agarao (born 1987), Filipina nurse and politician
