= 2022 Santa Cruz, Laguna, local elections =

Philippine election

2022 Santa Cruz local elections
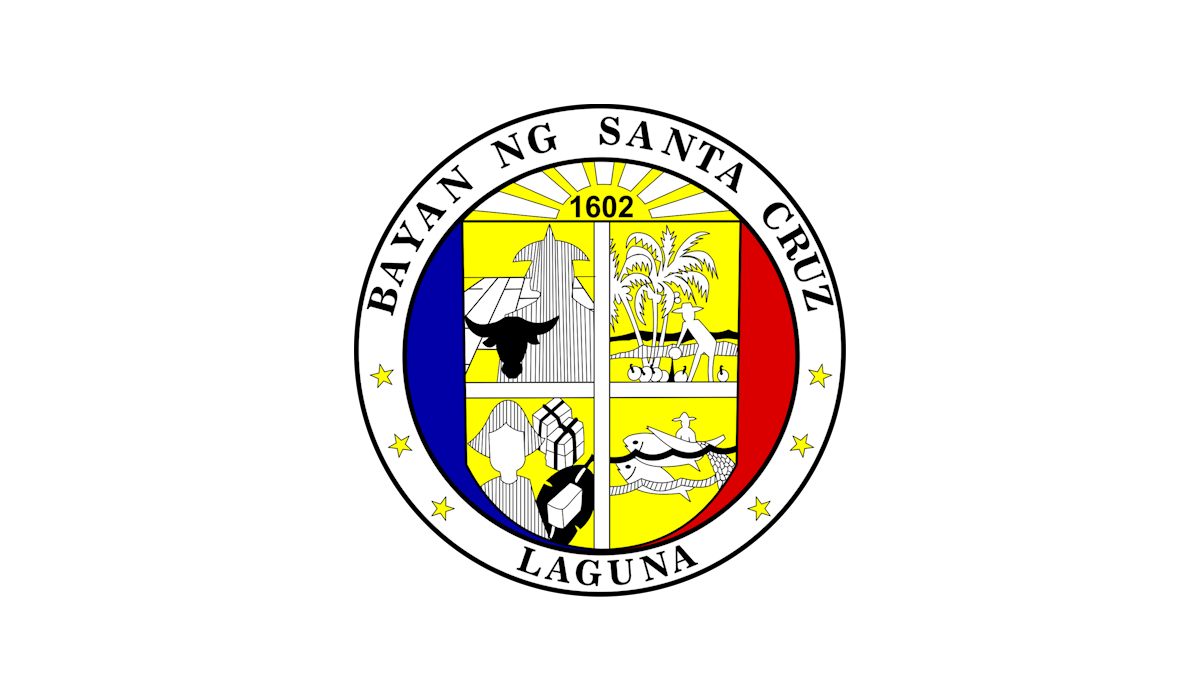
- May 9, 2022
- Mayoralty election
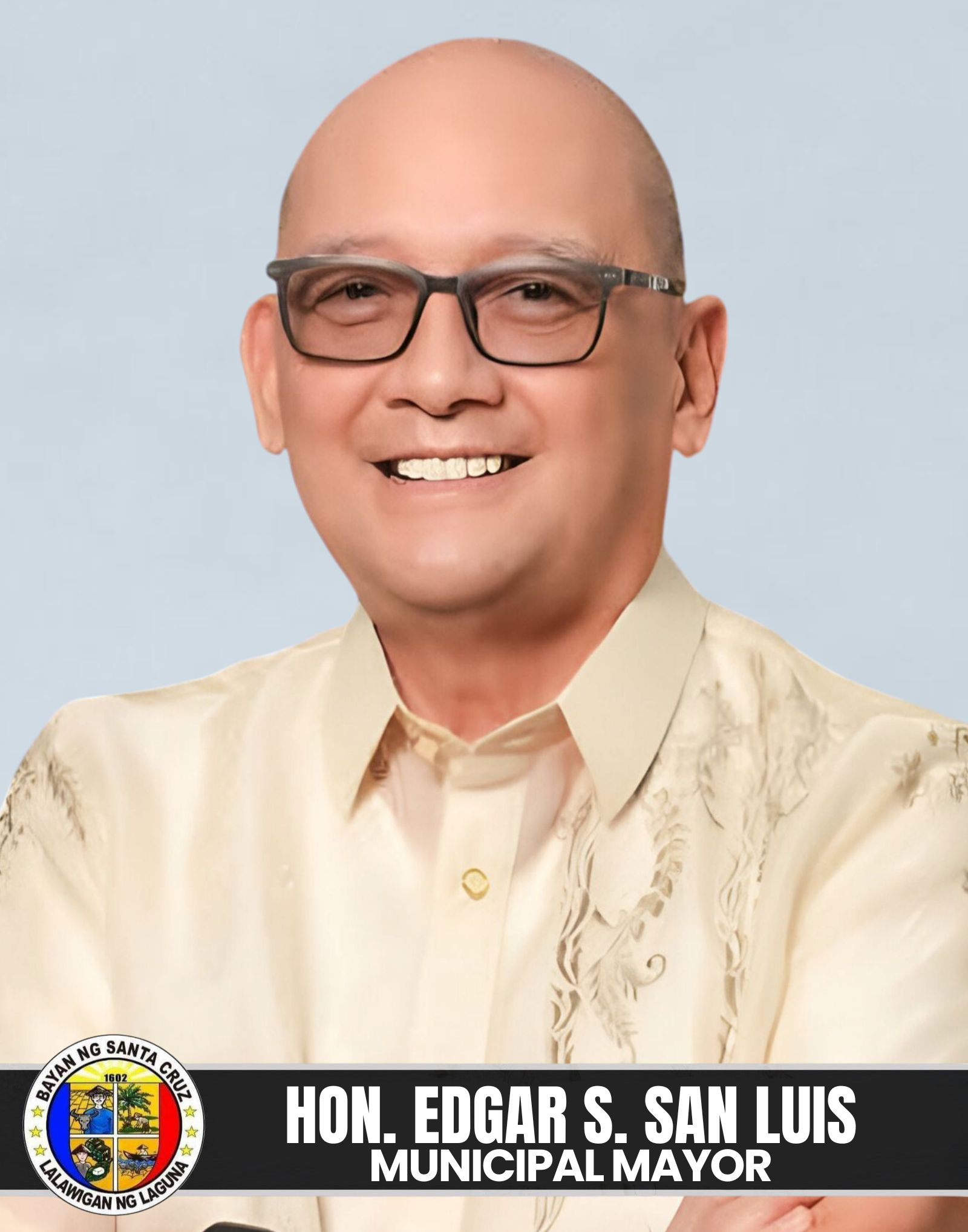

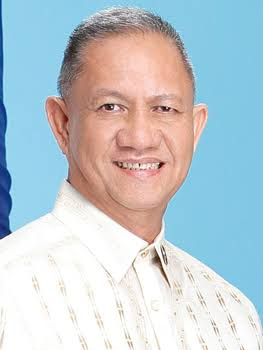
Candidate	Edgar San Luis	Benjamin Agarao Jr.
Party	Aksyon	PDP–Laban
Alliance	Serbisyong may Puso	Tropang pang Masa
Running mate	Louie De Leon	Laarni Malibiran (PROMDI)
Popular vote	33,062	31,809
Percentage	50.97	49.03
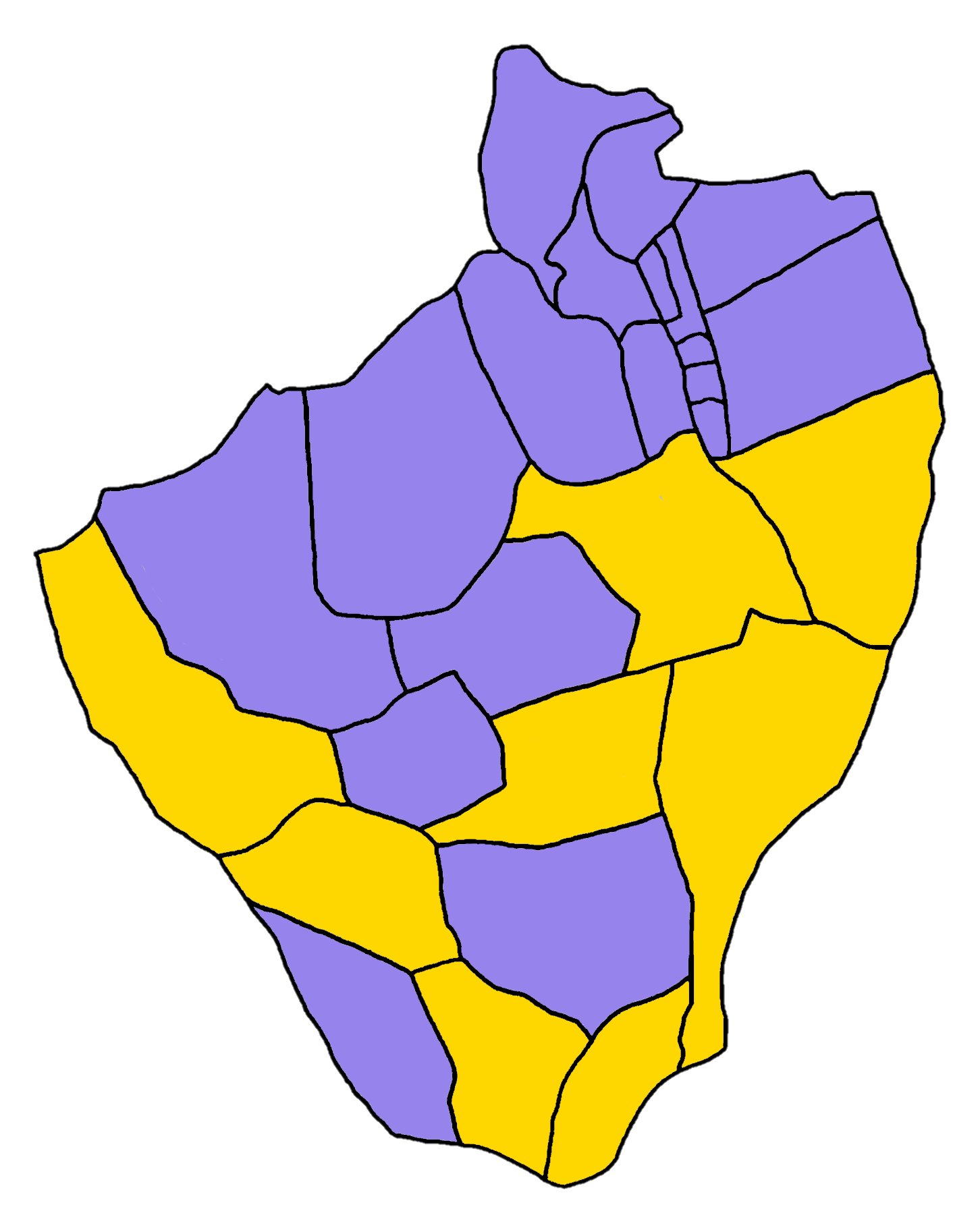
- Election results by barangay.
Mayor before election
Edgar San Luis
Nacionalista
Elected mayor
Edgar San Luis
Aksyon
- Vice mayoralty election
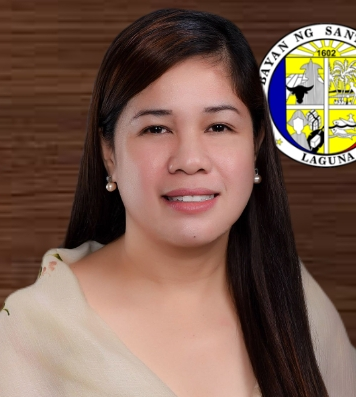

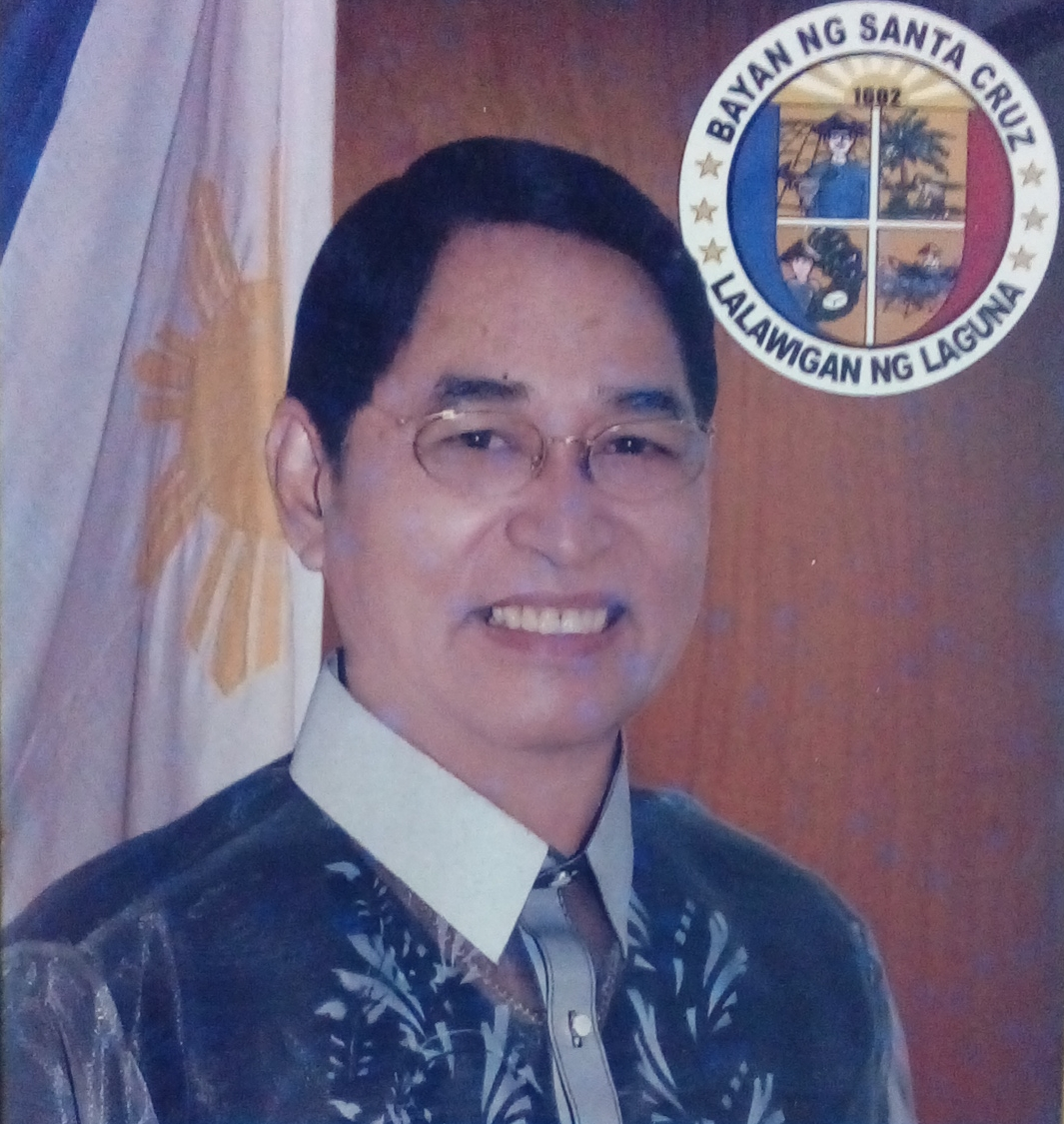
Candidate	Laarni Malibiran	Louie de Leon
Party	PROMDI	Aksyon
Alliance	Tropang pang Masa	Serbisyong may puso
Popular vote	37,099	24,997
Percentage	59.74	40.26
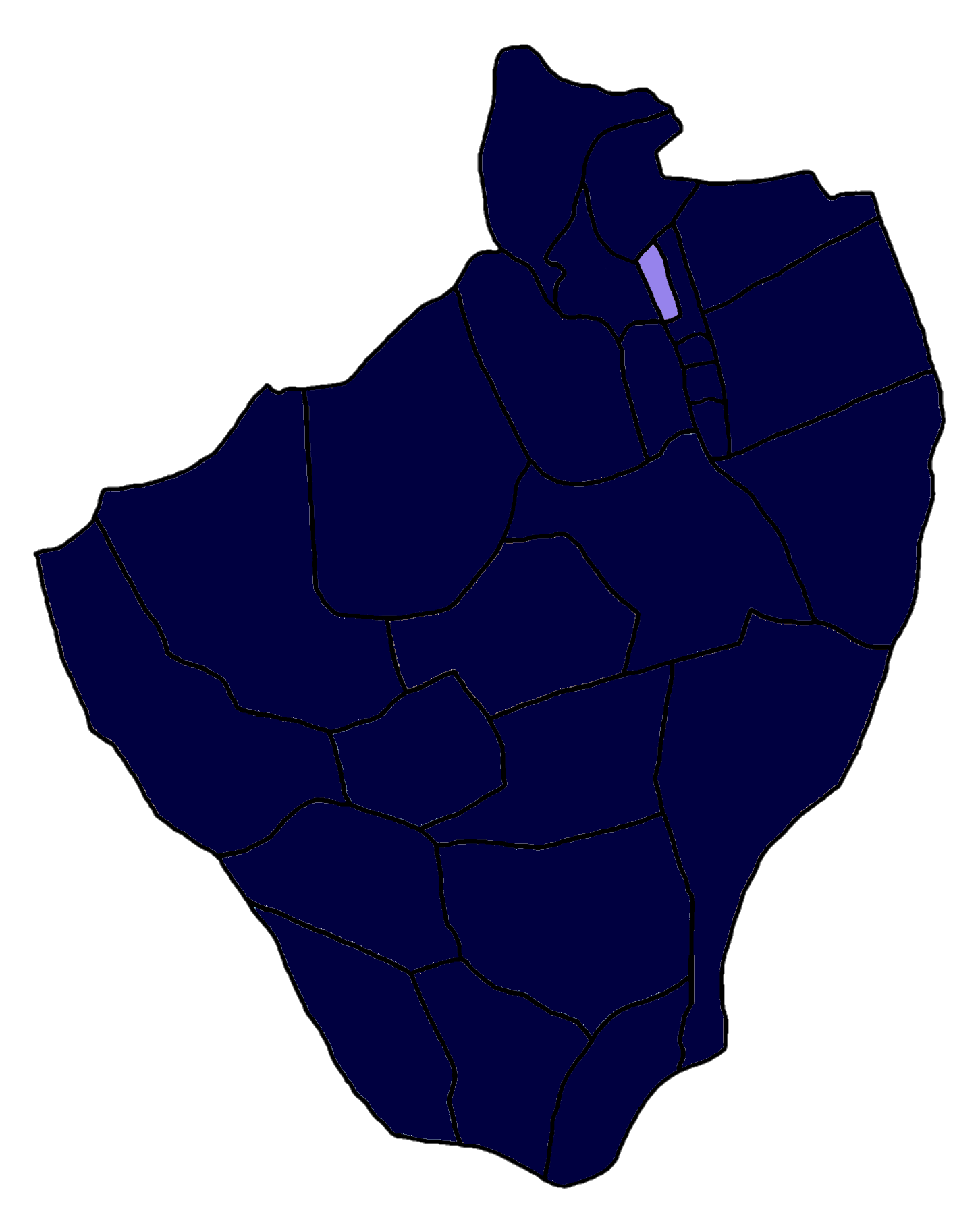
- Election results by barangay.
Vice Mayor before election
Laarni Malibiran
KDP
Elected Vice Mayor
Laarni Malibiran
PROMDI

Local elections were held in Santa Cruz on Monday, May 9, 2022, as a part of the 2022 Philippine general election. Voters will select candidates for all local positions: a town mayor, vice mayor and town councilors, as well as members of the Sangguniang Panlalawigan, a governor, a vice-governor and a representative for the province's fourth congressional district in the House of Representatives.

== Background ==
In 2019 elections Edgar San Luis ran as Mayor of Santa Cruz under the Nacionalista Party to succeed incumbent and term-limited Domingo Panganiban who wad running for Vice-Mayor. San Luis later won against to then incumbent Laguna Board member Benjo Agarao of PDP–Laban and to former Mayor Ariel Magcalas of KDP.

Incumbent San Luis is running for reelection under the Aksyon Demokratiko he's facing Laguna's 4th District Benjamin Agarao Jr. of PDP–Laban.

During the campaign period of the 2022 election, Incumbent Mayor of Manila Isko Moreno endorsed San Luis and Louie de Leon, while former Senator (later President) Bongbong Marcos endorsed Agarao and Laarni Malibiran.

== Tickets ==
=== Administration coalition ===
Team Serbisyong may Puso
#	Name	Party
For Mayor
2.	Edgar San Luis	Aksyon
For Vice Mayor
1.	Louie de Leon	Aksyon
For Councilor
4.	Efren Diaz	Aksyon
6.	Querubin Gabinete	Aksyon
8.	Angelito Joven	Aksyon
13.	Lucena Odejar	Aksyon
14.	Alan Pamatmat	Aksyon
15.	Ambiel Panganiban	Aksyon
18.	Ramon Tan	Aksyon
19.	Norman Tolentino	Aksyon

=== Primary opposition coalition ===
Team Tropang pang Masa
#	Name	Party
For Mayor
1.	Benjamin Agarao Jr.	PDP–Laban
For Vice Mayor
None (Note: Supporting guest candidate Laarni Malibiran of (PROMDI) see below.)
For Councilor
1.	Lea Almarves	PDP–Laban
2.	Frederick Ambrocio	PDP–Laban
3.	Esmeraldo de las Armas Jr.	PDP–Laban
5.	Renato Ernas	PDP–Laban
7.	Demmer Halili	PDP–Laban
10.	Rizaldy Kalaw	PDP–Laban
12.	Mia Martinez	PDP–Laban
16.	Serafin San Juan Jr.	PDP–Laban

=== Other coalitions and parties ===
Progressive Movement for the Devolution of Initiatives
#	Name	Party
For Vice Mayor
2.	Laarni Malibiran	PROMDI
For Councilor
9.	Mark Anthony Joven	PROMDI

Independent politician
#	Name	Party
For Councilor
11.	Romonito Lauta	Independent
17.	Percy San Miguel	Independent

== Results ==
The candidates for mayor and vice mayor with the highest number of votes wins the seat; they are voted separately, therefore, they may be of different parties when elected.

=== Mayor ===
Incumbent Edgar San Luis is running for reelection under Aksyon Demokratiko his main opponent is incumbent Laguna's 4th District Representative Benjamin Agarao Jr. of PDP–Laban.

2022 Santa Cruz mayoralty election
#	Candidate	Coalition	Party	Votes	%
1.	Edgar San Luis (Incumbent)	Serbisyong may Puso	Aksyon	33,062	50.97
2.	Benjamin Agarao Jr.	Tropang pang Masa	PDP–Laban	31,809	49.03
Valid ballots				64,871	81.15
Margin of victory				1,253	1.94
Invalid or blank ballots				15,067	18.85
Total votes				79,938	100.00
	Aksyon hold				

Popular vote percentage
Edgar San Luis	50.97%
Benjamin Agarao Jr.	49.03%

=== Vice Mayor ===
Incumbent Laarni Malibiran is running for reelection her main opponent is Incumbent Councilor and also her predecessor Louie de Leon.

2022 Santa Cruz vice mayoralty election
#	Candidate	Coalition	Party	Votes	%
1.	Laarni Malibiran (Incumbent)	Tropang pang Masa (Guest Candidate)	PROMDI	37,099	59.74
2.	Louie de Leon	Serbisyon may Puso	Aksyon	24,997	40.26
Valid ballots				62,096	77.68
Margin of victory				12,102	19.48
Invalid or blank ballots				17,842	22.32
Total votes				79,938	100.00
	PROMDI hold				

Popular vote percentage
Laarni Malibiran	59.74%
Louis de Leon	40.26%

=== Sangguniang Bayan ===
Election is via plurality-at-large voting: A voter votes for up to eight candidates, then the eight candidates with the highest number of votes are elected.

Party or alliance	Votes	%	Seats
Aksyon Demokratiko	203,491	48.95	4
PDP–Laban	177,137	42.61	3
PROMDI	25,087	6.03	1
Independent	9,981	2.04	0
Ex officio seats			2
Total votes	415,696	100.00	10

Vote share
Aksyon	48.95%
PDP–Laban	42.61%
PROMDI	6.03%
Independent	2.04%

Municipal Council seats
Aksyon	50.00%
PDP–Laban	37.50%
PROMDI	12.50%

2022 Santa Cruz sangguniang bayan election
#	Candidate	Coalition	Party	Votes	%
1.	Ambiel John Panganiban (Incumbent)	Serbisyong may Puso	Aksyon	34,775	8.37
2.	Lea Almarves (Incumbent)	Tropang pang Masa	PDP–Laban	29,711	7.15
3.	Norman Tolentino	Serbisyong may Puso	Aksyon	27,828	6.69
4.	Esmeraldo De Las Armas Jr.	Tropang pang Masa	PDP–Laban	26,911	6.47
5.	Pasirit Kalaw	Tropang pang Masa	PDP–Laban	26,626	6.41
6.	Mark Anthony Joven (Incumbent)	Tropang pang Masa (Guest Candidate)	PROMDI	25,087	6.03
7.	Lucena Odejar (Incumbent)	Serbisyong may Puso	Aksyon	25,087	6.03
8.	Alan Pamatmat (Incumbent)	Serbisyong may Puso	Aksyon	24,667	5.93
9.	Efren Diaz (Incumbent)	Serbisyong may Puso	Aksyon	24,322	5.85
10.	Angelito Joven	Serbisyong may Puso	Aksyon	22,537	5.42
11.	Ramon Tan (Incumbent)	Serbisyong may Puso	Aksyon	22,179	5.34
12.	Querubin Gabinete	Serbisyong may Puso	Aksyon	22,096	5.32
13.	Serafin San Juan Jr.	Tropang pang Masa	PDP–Laban	21,494	5.17
14.	Mia Martinez	Tropang pang Masa	PDP–Laban	21,145	5.09
15.	Demmer Halili	Tropang pang Masa	PDP–Laban	18,990	4.57
16.	Frederick Ambrosio	Tropang pang Masa	PDP–Laban	16,543	3.98
17.	Renato Ernas	Tropang pang Masa	PDP–Laban	15,717	3.78
18.	Percy San Miguel		Independent	8,522	2.05
19.	Ramonito Lauta		Independent	1,459	0.35
Valid ballots				415,696	65.00
Invalid or blank ballots				223,808	35.00
Total votes				639,504	100.00

== Aftermath ==
After the Municipal Board of Canvassers proclaimed reelectionist Edgar San Luis of Aksyon Demokratiko, The supporters of then incumbent Congressman Benjamin Agarao Jr. of PDP–Laban said the election was cheated and will file a complaint against San Luis. On the 14th of July 2023, one year after the elections some groups and individuals go to the Commission on Elections (COMELEC) office in Santa Cruz, Laguna to file for a Recall election for the position of Mayor, The COMELEC accept the complaint. On the 17th of July 2023, three days after the complaint was filed and accept by the COMELEC the incumbent Mayor Edgar San Luis official answer the questions of his supporters, he said Who ever is the person behind all this will be held prosecuted because only in the early 2023, Rumors has it that someone is buying the signature of a townsman and has a bribe of five hundred pesos and three/five kilos of rice.
