= Edgar San Luis =

Filipino businessman and politician (born 1955)

Egay San Luis
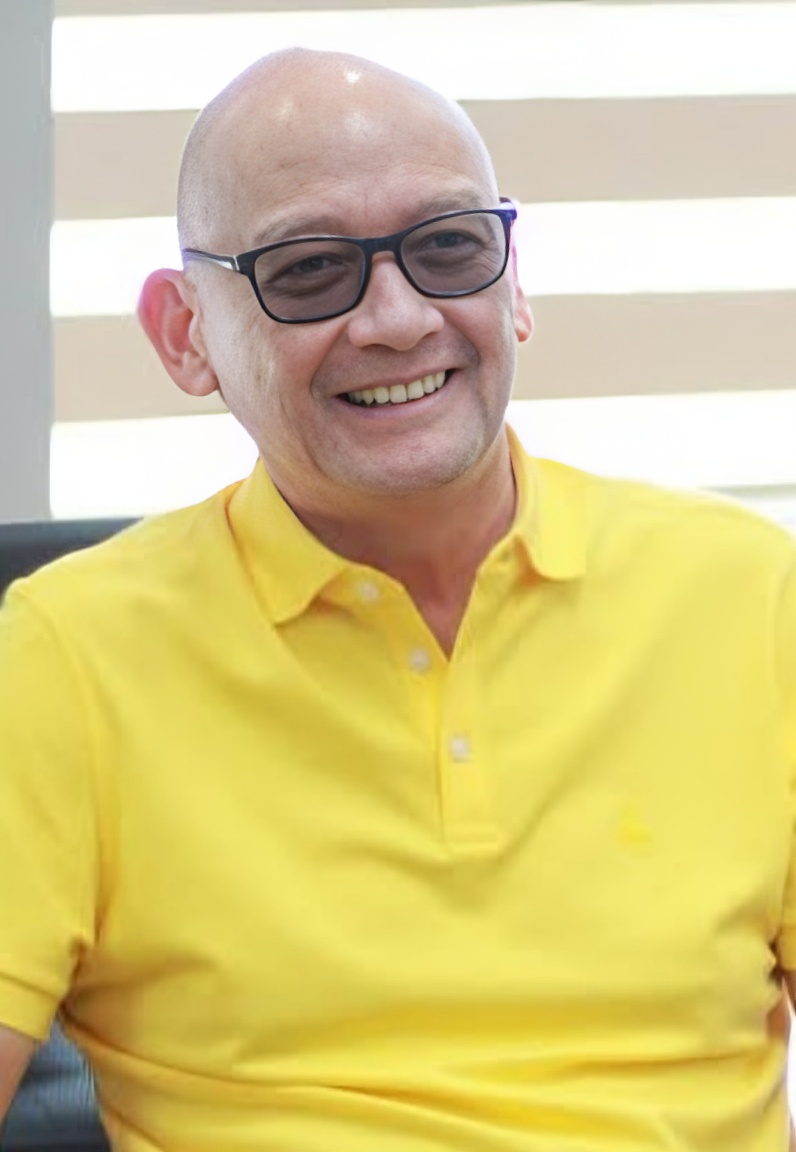
- San Luis in 2025

Mayor of Santa Cruz
- In office June 30, 2019 – June 30, 2025
- Vice Mayor: Laarni Malibiran
- Preceded by: Domingo G. Panganiban
- Succeeded by: Benjo Agarao

Member of the Philippine House of Representatives from Laguna's 4th district
- In office June 30, 2007 – June 30, 2013
- Preceded by: Benjamin Agarao Jr.
- Succeeded by: Benjamin Agarao Jr.

Personal details
- Born: Edgar Sulit San Luis; July 12, 1955 (age 71) Santa Cruz, Laguna, Philippines
- Party: NUP (2015–2018; 2024–present)
- Other political affiliations: Aksyon Demokratiko (2021–2024); Nacionalista (2018–2021); Liberal (2012–2015); NPC (2009–2012); KAMPI (2008–2009); Independent (2007–2008)
- Spouse: Doris Laviña
- Children: 4 (including Rai-Ann and Milo)
- Parent: Felicisimo San Luis (father)
- Relatives: Rodolfo San Luis (brother)
- Education: Don Bosco College – Canlubang (BCom); University of Santo Tomas (MCom)
- Occupation: Businessman; Politician
- Nickname: Egay

Edgar Sulit San Luis (born July 12, 1955), also known as (Kuya) Egay San Luis, is a Filipino politician, businessman and former media executive. He had served as Mayor of Santa Cruz, Laguna from June 30, 2019 until June 30, 2025. He previously served as Member of the Philippine House of Representatives representing Laguna's 4th district from June 30, 2007 to June 30, 2013.

San Luis' stint in politics began in 2007 elections, when he sought a seat in Congress and ultimately defeating the incumbent with 48% to 43% of Benjamin Agarao Jr. In 2013, he was the Liberal Party candidate for the governorship, challenging incumbent ER Ejercito. San Luis lost the election to Ejercito in a tight race, 46% to 53%.

In 2016, San Luis seek to reclaim his former post in Congress but lost to incumbent Agarao via landslide, 41% to 57%. In 2019, he ran for Mayor of Santa Cruz and won with a margin of 48% to 45% over Benjo Agarao. He was reelected in 2022, but was defeated in 2025 by Benjo, 42% to 57%.

== Early life and career ==
Edgar Sulit San Luis was born on July 12, 1955, in Santa Cruz, Laguna. His father was Felicisimo San Luis (1919–1992), a lawyer, and his mother, Virginia Sulit (died 1963), was an educator. San Luis has six siblings, namely: Rodolfo, Mila, Linda, Emilita, Manuel and Tobias.

San Luis' father served as Councilor of Santa Cruz, Laguna, and subsequently the provincial Governor of Laguna, serving from 1959 until his death in 1992. Edgar's brother, Rodolfo was Mayor of Santa Cruz, Laguna from 1988 until 1995 and served as Congressman for Laguna's 4th district from 1998 until 2004.

San Luis' inspiration is his father, he became his guide during his early years, he stand on his own feet, and struggled for his education even though his father was a famous politician. This led to him studying Commerce during his college years in Don Bosco College, Canlubang.

Before seeking public office, San Luis's primarily known in sales, marketing and advertising. He had previously served as President of the Radio Philippines Network (RPN), one of the biggest TV stations in the Philippines during the 1970s–90s. It is now known as the DZKB-TV.

== House of Representatives (2007–2013) ==
San Luis had held the position as Member of the House of Representatives representing Laguna's 4th district serving from June 30, 2007 until June 30, 2013, respectively.

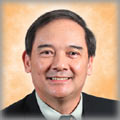
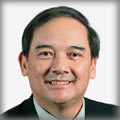
Official Portraits of San Luis during the 14th (left) and 15th Congresses (right).

=== Elections ===
==== 2007 ====
San Luis' first stint in politics was during the 2007 Philippine elections in favor of his brother, Rodolfo, when he ran for a seat in the Philippine House of Representatives to represent the 4th district of Laguna. He ran as an independent candidate.

On May 14, 2007, the elections were held and on May 18, San Luis would be proclaimed as the duly elected Congressman of the district, unseating the incumbent Benjamin Agarao Jr. of the Liberal Party. San Luis managed to win 48.46% of the votes to 43.56% of Agarao.

==== 2010 ====
On May 10, 2010, the elections were held. San Luis ran under Nationalist People's Coalition and would be proclaimed on the same day, winning his re-election unopposed, respectively.

=== House of Representative Tenure ===
Prior to assuming the position of Representative of Laguna's 4th district, he was a businessman and media executive, primarily known in sales, marketing and advertising.

In 2007, during his first term in Congress, he became controversial when he endorsed the three-page Impeachment Complaint filed by lawyer Roberto Rafael Pulido against President Gloria Macapagal Arroyo. The complaint discussed the failure to take action over the awarding of a $329 million contract to the Chinese telecom company, ZTE. On October 11, the complaint was moved to the House Justice Committee. The same day, Arroyo discussed the complaint with lawmakers in the House of Representatives. The complaint was later discarded due to Arroyo's party dominance in the House. Congressman Matias Defensor Jr. later stated that the House would not accept any more impeachment complaints.

In 2009, San Luis authored House Resolution No. 1142 which aimed to grant Freddie Roach, an American boxing trainer and former professional boxer a Filipino citizenship for his efforts training Manny Pacquiao for his boxing matches.

During the 15th Congress, San Luis authored House Bill No. 5445 that aims to impose a prison penalty of six months to one year and a fine of 100,000 to 500,000 pesos against violators of the proposed act. The bill main purpose is to prevent hospitals from charging any on-the-job training fees on registered nurses who render services in these institutions to gain work experience. Earlier, during his first term, he filed a bill seeking to protect new registered nurses.

On December 12, 2011, San Luis was among 187 lawmakers from the House of Representatives who signed the impeachment complaint against Chief Justice Renato Corona, who was accused of committing graft and corruption, violating the Constitution, and betrayal of public trust.

San Luis voted for Jose de Venecia Jr. as House Speaker during the opening session of the 14th Congress. During the ouster of de Venecia, on February 4, 2008, San Luis voted yes to declare the position of Speaker vacant. On July 26, 2010, during the opening session of the 15th Congress, San Luis voted for Feliciano Belmonte Jr. for Speaker. During both of his terms in the House of Representatives, he joined the Majority bloc.

=== House Committee membership ===
The following were the House Committees assigned for San Luis during the 14th and 15th Congresses, respectively:

San Luis house committee memberships
House Committees	Congress	
House Committees	14th	15th
Accounts	—N/a	Member
Agriculture and Food	Member	—N/a
Appropriations	—N/a	Vice Chairperson
Aquaculture and Fisheries Resources	—N/a	Member
Cooperatives Development	Member	—N/a
Ecology	—N/a	Member
Economic Affairs	Vice Chairperson	—N/a
Government Enterprises and Privatization	—N/a	Member
Government Reorganization	Vice Chairperson	—N/a
Higher and Technical Education	—N/a	Member
Human Rights	Member	—N/a
Information and Communications Technology	—N/a	Member
Inter-Parliamentary Relations and Diplomacy	—N/a	Member
Justice	Member	—N/a
Labor and Employment	Member	—N/a
Natural Resources	—N/a	Member
Overseas Workers Affairs	Member	—N/a
Peace, Reconciliation and Unity	Member	—N/a
Public Information	Vice Chairperson	—N/a
Public Works and Highways	Member	
Reforestation	—N/a	Member
Science and Technology	—N/a	Member
Social Services	—N/a	Member
Southern Tagalog Development	Member	Vice Chairperson
Tourism	—N/a	Vice Chairperson
Trade and Industry	Member	—N/a

=== Bills filed ===
The following are the list of House Bills filed and authored by San Luis, himself during his tenure in Congress in 14th and 15th Congresses.

Principal Authored Bills
  - House Bill 1631 - An Act Declaring Every 2nd Day of October as Majayjay Day and Designating it as an Official Non-Working Holiday in All the Barangays in the Municipality of Majayjay, Province of Laguna (July 31, 2007; 14th Congress)
  - House Bill 1749 - An Act Creating a Goat Dairy Farm Center in Barangay Mayatba, Municipality of Famy, Province of Laguna, and Appropriating Funds Therefore (August 2, 2007; 14th Congress)
  - House Bill 1750 - An Act Creating an Agro-Industrial High School in Barangay Kapatalan, Municipality of Siniloan, Province of Laguna, to be known as the Governor Felicisimo San Luis Agro-Industrial High School and Appropriating Funds Therefore (August 2, 2007; 14th Congress)
  - House Bill 1751 - An Act Creating a Goat Dairy Farm Center in Barangay Sabang, Municipality of Magdalena, Province of Laguna, and Appropriating Funds Therefore (August 2, 2007; 14th Congress)
  - House Bill 2048 - Pilot Farmers' Post-Harvest Facilities Center Act (August 14, 2007; 14th Congress)
  - House Bill 2217 - Agricultural Innovation Promotion Act (August 23, 2007; 14th Congress)
  - House Bill 2218 - An Act Establishing Post-Harvest Facilities for the Benefit of Rice Farmers in the Province of Laguna and Appropriating Funds Therefore (August 23, 2007; 14th Congress)
  - House Bill 2285 - An Act Reclassifying the Crime of Stealing Installed Electric Power Equipment and Materials from Electric Power Utilities as Qualified Theft and Increasing the Penalty Therefore (August 29, 2007; 14th Congress)
  - House Bill 2371 - An Act Providing for the Establishment of the Virginia Sulit-San Luis Memorial Children's Hospital in the Municipality of Siniloan, Laguna (September 3, 2007; 14th Congress)
  - House Bill 2372 - An Act Declaring the Taytay Falls in Majayjay, Buruisan Falls of Famy, Buntot Palos and Ambon-Ambon Falls of Pangil, All in the Province of Laguna, as Tourist Spots, Providing for its Development and Appropriating Funds Therefore (September 3, 2007; 14th Congress)
  - House Bill 2431 - An Act Institutionalizing the Creation of a Scholarship Fund in Every Private School, College and University which has been Operating Profitably at least for the last 10 Years for the Benefit of Poor but Deservinh Students (September 5, 2007; 14th Congress)
  - House Bill 2477 - An Act Promoting and Institutionalizing the One-Town-One-Product Program in all Provinces Nationwide and Rationalizing their Specialization to Encourage the Promotion, Development and Growth of a Million Small Enterprises in the Rural Areas and Appropriating Funds Therefore (September 11, 2007; 14th Congress)
  - House Bill 2583 - An Act Establishing an Ornamental Fish Zone in Laguna De Bay to be Operated by the Bureau of Fisheries and Aquatic Resources and Appropriating Funds Therefor (September 18, 2007; 14th Congress)
  - House Bill 2963 - An Act to Reform the Laguna Lake Development Authority (LLDA), Appropriating Funds Therefor and For Other Purposes (October 17, 2007; 14th Congress)
  - House Bill 3193 - Micro-Hydroelectric Power Development Incentives Act (December 3, 2007; 14th Congress)
  - House Bill 3685 - An Act Declaring October 2 of Every Year an Official Nonworking Holiday in the Municipality of Majayjay, Province of Laguna, and in All its Barangays, to be Known as 'Majayjay Day' (March 3, 2008; 14th Congress)
  - House Bill 3687 - An Act Seeking the Creation of Poten and Eliseo Quesada Memorial National High School in Paete, Province of Laguna (March 3, 2008; 14th Congress)
  - House Bill 5249 - An Act Establishing a National Agro-Industrial High School in Barangay Kapatalan, Municipality of Siniloan, Province of Laguna to be Known as Governor Felicisimo T. San Luis National Agro-Industrial High School and Appropriating Funds Therefor (October 2, 2008; 14th Congress)
  - House Bill 5606 - An Act Establishing a Paete Handicraft Research and Development Center and Appropriating Funds Therefor (December 10, 2008; 14th Congress)
  - House Bill 5985 - An Act Prohibiting Public and Private Hospitals from Requiring the Payment of Money upon Post Graduate Nurses who want to gain Work Experience from their Hospitals and Penalizing any Violation Thereof (February 18, 2009; 14th Congress)
  - House Bill 5986 - An Act Providing for the Establishment of a Government Corporate Monitoring and Coordinating Committee for all Government-Owned Controlled Corporations and Appropriating Funds Therefor (February 18, 2009; 14th Congress)
  - House Bill 6279 - An Act Separating Bubukal Elementary School Annex in Barangay San Juan, Municipality of Sta. Cruz, Province of Laguna from Bubukal Elementary School Converting it into an Independent Elementary School, to be known as the San Juan Elementary School and Appropriating Funds Therefor (April 28, 2009; 14th Congress)
  - House Bill 6567 - An Act Separating the San Juan National High School - Paete Annex in the Municipality of Paete, Province of Laguna from the San Juan National High School, Converting it into an Independent National High School to be known as Poyen and Eliseo Quesada Memorial National High School, and Appropriating Funds Therefor (July 7, 2009; 14th Congress)
  - House Bill 6987 - An Act to Strengthen the Laguna Lake Development Authority (LLDA), Thereby Repealing Republic Act No. 4850, as Amended, Otherwise Known as the Laguna Development Authority Act of 1966, and for Other Purposes (November 16, 2009; 14th Congress)
  - House Bill 7085 - An Act to Establish an Agro-Industrial and Renewable Energy Technology park at the Laguna-Quezon Land Grant of the University of the Philippines (December 15, 2009; 14th Congress)
  - House Bill 765 - An Act Providing for the Conversion of the Pagsanjan-Magdalena-Majayjay-Lucban Provincial Road in the Municipalities of Pagsanjan, Magdalena, Majayjay, Province of Laguna and Lucban, Province of Quezon into a National Road, and Appropriating Funds Therefor (July 5, 2010; 15th Congress)
  - House Bill 766 - An Act Separating Bubukal Elementary School Annex in Barangay San Juan, Municipality of Sta. Cruz, Province of Laguna from Bubukal Elementary School, Converting it into an Independent Elementary School, to be Known as the San Juan Elementary School and Appropriating Funds Therefor (July 5, 2010; 15th Congress)
  - House Bill 767 - An Act Prohibiting Public and Private Hospitals from Requiring the Payment of Money upon Post Graduate Nurses who want to gain Work Experience from their Hospitals and Penalizing any Violation Thereof (July 5, 2010; 15th Congress)
  - House Bill 1983 - An Act Separating the San Juan National High School - Paete Annex in the Municipality of Paete, Province of Laguna from the San Juan National High School, Converting it into an Independent National High School to be known as Potten and Eliseo Quesada Memorial National High School, and Appropriating Funds Therefore (August 2, 2010; 15th Congress)
  - House Bill 2120 - An Act Providing for Mandatory Drug Testing for Drivers Previously Involved in Traffic Accidents, Amending for the Purpose Section 36 of RA 9165 or the Comprehensive Dangerous Drug Act of 2002 (August 3, 2010; 15th Congress)
  - House Bill 2401 - An Act to Strengthen the Laguna Lake Development Authority (LLDA), Appropriating Funds Therefor and For Other Purposes (August 11, 2010; 15th Congress)
  - House Bill 2420 - An Act Creating a Special Court to be Known as the "Dangerous Drugs Court" and for Other Purposes (August 11, 2010; 15th Congress)
  - House Bill 2749 - An Act Declaring Taytay Falls in the Municipality of Majayjay, Buruisan Falls in the Municipality of Famy, Bunto Palos an Ambon-Ambon Falls in the Municipality of Pangil, All in the Province of Laguna, as Tourist Spots, Providing for its Development and Appropriating Funds Therefor (August 24, 2010; 15th Congress)
  - House Bill 3785 - An Act Improving the Welfare Benefits for the Members of the Government Service Insurance System, Further Amending for the Purpose Presidential Decree No. 1146, as Amended, Otherwise Known as the "Revised Government Service Insurance System Act of 1977 (December 1, 2010; 15th Congress)
  - House Bill 3786 - An Act Providing for the Stronger Anti-Smuggling Strategies, Amending for the Purpose Presidential Decree No. 1464, Otherwise Known as "The Tariff and Customs Code of 1978 (December 1, 2010; 15th Congress)
  - House Bill 4167 - An Act Providing for the Conversion of the Mabitac-Pangil-Pakil-Jala-Jala Provincial Road in the Municipalities of Mabitac, Pangil and Pakil, Province of Laguna and Jala-Jala, Province of Rizal into a National Road, and Appropriating Funds Therefor (February 8, 2011; 15th Congress)
  - House Bill 5314 - An Act Upgrading the Position of Sanitation Inspector to the Next Higher Salary Grade and Appropriating Funds Therefor (September 19, 2011; 15th Congress)
  - House Bill 5445 - An Act Prohibiting Public and Private Hospitals from Requiring the Payment of Money upon Registered Nurses who want to gain Work Experience and Penalizing any Violation Thereof (October 20, 2011; 15th Congress)
  - House Bill 5539 - An Act Creating an Additional Branch of the Regional Trial Court in the Fourth Judicial Region to be Stationed in the Municipality of Siniloan, Province of Laguma, Further Amending for the Purpose Batas Pambansa Bilang 129, Otherwise Known as "The Judicial Reorganization Act of 1980," as Amended, and Appropriating Funds Therefor (November 23, 2011; 15th Congress)
  - House Bill 5540 - An Act Creating an Additional Branch of the Regional Trial Court in the Fourth Judicial Region to be Stationed in the Municipality of Sta. Cruz, Province of Laguna, Further Amending for the Purpose Batas Pambansa Bilang 129, Otherwise Known as "The Judicial Reorganization Act of 1980," as Amended, and Appropriating Funds Therefor (November 23, 2011; 15th Congress)
  - House Bill 6017 - An Act Separating Sta. Maria National High School - Juan Santiago Annex in Brgy. Juan Santiago, Municipality of Sta. Maria, Province of Laguna from Sta. Maria National High School, Converting it into an Independent National High School to be known as the Juan Santiago National High School and Appropriating Funds Therefor (March 14, 2012; 15th Congress)
  - House Bill 6312 - An Act Establishing an Extension Office of the Land Transportation Office (LTO) in the Municipality of Mabitac, Province of Laguna and Appropriating Funds Therefor (June 6, 2012; 15th Congress)
  - House Bill 6864 - An Act Creating an Additional Branch of the Regional Trial Court in the Fourth Judicial Region to be Stationed in the Municipality of Sta. Cruz, Province of Laguna, Further Amending for the Purpose Section 14, Paragraph (E) of Batas Pambansa Blg. 129, Otherwise Known as "The Judiciary Reorganization Act of 1980", as Amended, and Appropriating Funds Therefor (January 30, 2013; 15th Congress)
  - House Bill 6866 - An Act Creating an Additional Branch of the Regional Trial Court in the Fourth Judicial Region to be Stationed in the Municipality of Siniloan, Province of Laguna, Further Amending for the Purpose Section 14, Paragraph (E) of Batas Pambansa Blg. 129, Otherwise Known as "The Judiciary Reorganization Act of 1980", as Amended, and Appropriating Funds Therefor (January 30, 2013; 15th Congress)

== 2013 gubernatorial election ==
Although, San Luis was eligible to run for re-election in the House of Representatives for his third and final consecutive term, but he instead sought a higher position to serve the people of Laguna. He filed his Certificate of Candidacy (COC) for the upcoming 2013 Philippine elections for the position of Governor under the Liberal Party of the Aquino Administration. His sole opponent was the incumbent Governor Emilio Ramon Ejercito III, popularly known as "E.R." He was running under the opposition's United Nationalist Alliance. Ejercito is a famous actor who turned politician during the 2001 elections, respectively.

During the campaign period, the battle for the governorship was heated, revolving into dishonoring and throwing name-calling at each other's party. Three days prior to the upcoming election, San Luis filed a disqualification case against Ejercito before the Office of the COMELEC Clerk in Intramuros, Manila. In the filed case seeks Ejercito's disqualification due to his "orange-cards" and overspending during the campaign, respectively. Subsequently, on May 16, San Luis filed an urgent Ex-Parte Motion to issue the suspension of the possible proclamation of Ejercito. However, the COMELEC didn't act on the motion filed. On May 17, Governor Ejercito would be proclaimed by the Provincial Board of Canvassers (PBOC) as the duly reelected governor of Laguna.

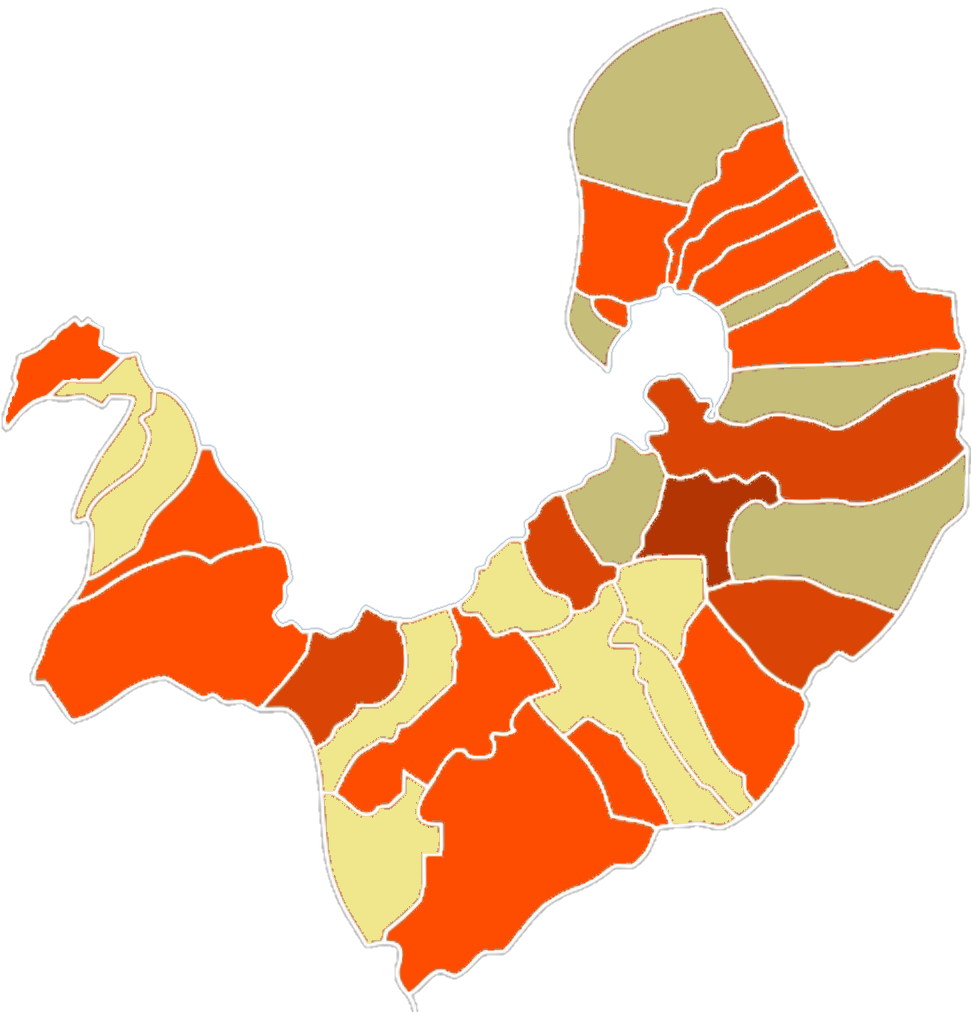
Results map by city/municipality Ejercito: 50–55%; 56–60%; 61%+; San Luis: 50–55%; 56%+

Based on the Official Certificate of Canvass by the PBOC, San Luis garnered 471,209 votes (46.17%) to Ejercito's 549,310 votes (53.83%).

In September 2013, the Commission on Elections (COMELEC) ruled that Ejercito is thereby disqualified for campaign overspending during the 2013 election. Later, in May 2014, the COMELEC En Banc ordered Governor Ejercito to voluntarily step down from his office, and later appealed to the Supreme Court to null the COMELEC's decision, but was later denied.

On May 30, 2014, Governor Ejercito voluntarily stepped down from his position, in favor of his uncle, former President and Manila City Mayor Joseph Ejercito Estrada. Incumbent Vice Governor Ramil Hernandez already took his oath on May 27 to replace Ejercito as the Governor, while Board Member Katherine Agapay would be elevated to the Vice Governorship on May 30.

== 2016 congressional comeback attempt ==
After his failed 2013 Gubernatorial bid, San Luis once again planned to run for the 2016 elections as the Liberal Party candidate. In October 2015, the Liberal Party and the Nacionalista Party of incumbent Governor Ramil Hernandez joined forces, setting aside San Luis as a candidate. He would later leave the Liberal Party after having a conflict with the LP–NP Coalition and join the National Unity Party (NUP).

On October 15, 2015, surprisingly he filed his Certificate of Candidacy (COC) for Representative of Laguna's 4th district seeking a comeback, dropping his second planned Gubernatorial run to give way to Governor Hernandez, who was endorsed by the Aquino Administration. San Luis later endorsed Senator Grace Poe's presidential bid for the upcoming election.

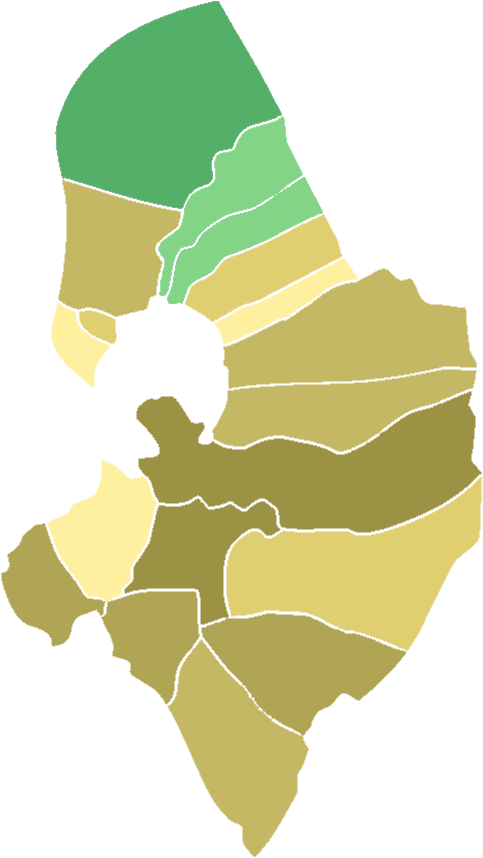
Results map by municipality Agarao: 41–45%; 46–50%; 51–55%; 56–60%; 61%+; San Luis: 46–50%; 56%+

On May 10, one day after the election day, the Provincial Board of Canvassers (PBOC) officially announced the final results. San Luis garnered 99,262 votes (41.69%) compared to 137,058 votes (57.56%) for former Representative Benjamin Agarao Jr. of the Liberal Party. San Luis conceded the election to Agarao.

== Mayor of Santa Cruz, Laguna (2019–2025) ==
San Luis held the position of Mayor of Santa Cruz, Laguna, serving from June 30, 2019 until June 30, 2025.

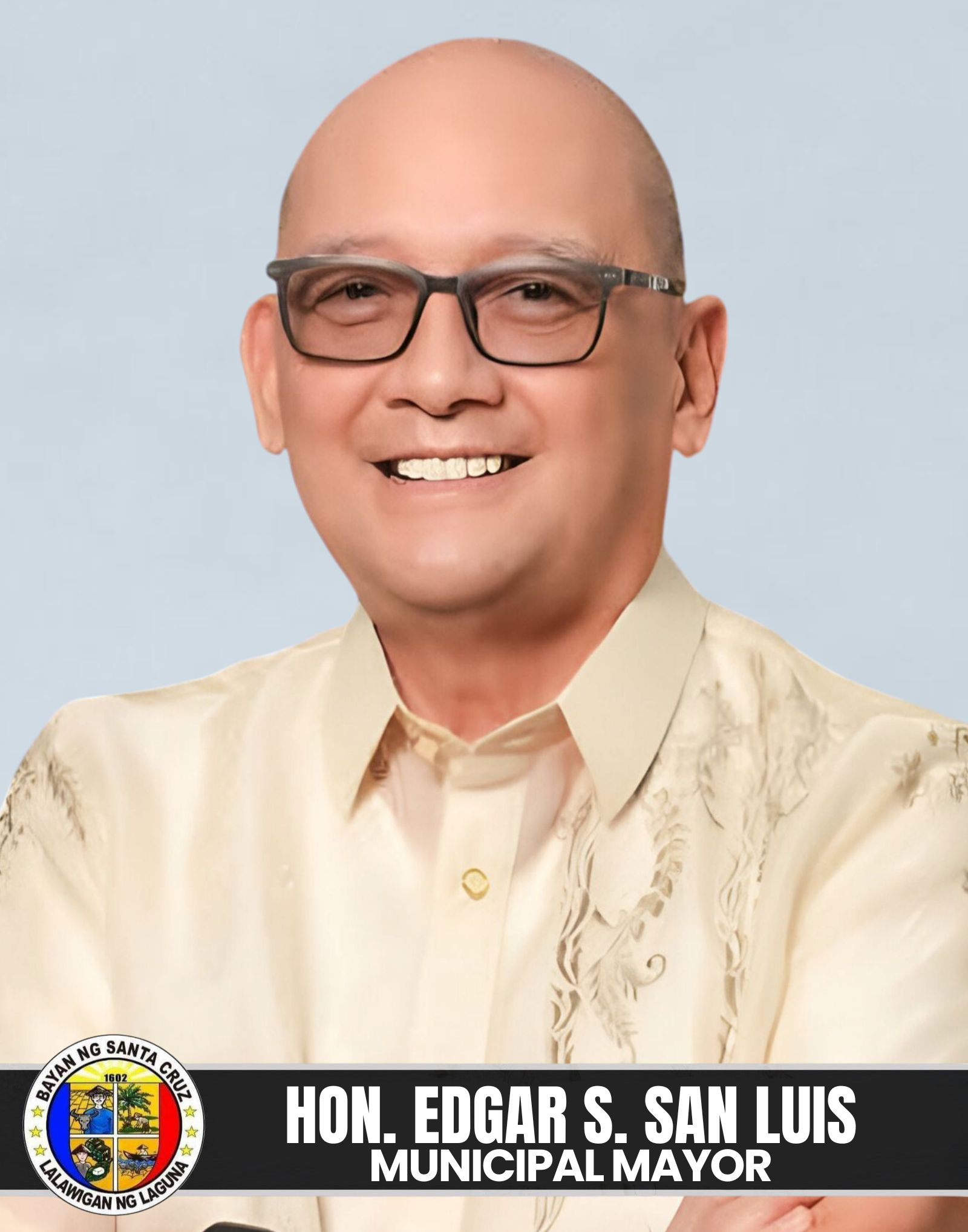
San Luis' mayoral portrait in 2025.

=== Elections ===
==== 2019 ====
On October 16, 2019, San Luis filed his Certificate of Candidacy (COC) for Mayor before the COMELEC office in Santa Cruz, Laguna. He ran under the Nacionalista Party, with term-limited Mayor Domingo G. Panganiban as his running-mate and formed their own slate, Team Egay-Dennis.

On May 13, 2019, the elections were held and on the same day, he was proclaimed as Mayor–elect beating incumbent Board Member Benjo Agarao and former Mayor Ariel Magcalas. San Luis garnered 48.09% of the votes to 45.16% of Agarao and in distant third, Magcalas with 6.75%.

==== 2022 ====
On October 5, 2021, San Luis filed his Certificate of Candidacy (COC) under Aksyon Demokratiko for re-election in COMELEC Santa Cruz office. He formed his new slate with incumbent Councilor Louie De Leon as his running-mate.

On February 11, 2022, San Luis endorsed the campaign of Manila Mayor Isko Moreno for the presidency with other local candidates.

On May 9, 2022, the elections were held and on May 10, he was officially proclaimed for his second term in office, after garnering 50.97% of the votes to 49.03% of his sole opponent Benjamin Agarao Jr., incumbent Representative.

==== 2025 ====
On October 2, 2024, San Luis filed his Certificate of Candidacy (COC) under the National Unity Party for his third and final term in the new COMELEC Santa Cruz office, located in Metro Central Mall. This time, his running-mate is Laura Obligacion, ex officio Councilor for Liga ng mga Barangay.

The campaign trial was heated and on May 12, the elections were held and eventually, San Luis would be defeated by incumbent (Senior) Board Member Benjo Agarao in a rematch, he obtained 47.54% of the votes to Agarao's 52.46%. The next day, San Luis thanked his supporters and conceded the election.

=== Mayoral Tenure ===
San Luis took office on June 30, 2019 succeeding outgoing Mayor Domingo G. Panganiban. His first term was seen as a fresh leadership in Santa Cruz. During his first term the town's water provider was a problem and was replaced with PrimeWater, a water and wastewater services provider owned by the Villar family. This resulted in controversies due to its failed services not only in Santa Cruz, but in other places where it is the main service provider. On May 19, 2025, after a five-year contract with the company, San Luis announced that the town's water district finalized a decision to end their contract with PrimeWater due to its failed services.

During San Luis' term, the town faced major crisis's, especially when the COVID-19 virus erupted which resulted in government placing the country in a lockdown. Unemployment was high, the town's economy was primarily hit by the pandemic. San Luis acted immediately and launched his program, the Kabuhayanihan. This initiative focused on providing help for families with sustainable livelihoods, he also authorized to scanned all the unused lands in the town and started a community garden program for food for those families affected by the pandemic.

On July 14, 2023, one year after the polls. A petition to recall San Luis' election was filed before the COMELEC office in Santa Cruz by incumbent Councillor Rizaldy Kalaw and other individuals. The reason includes loss of confidence in San Luis' leadership, allegations of fraud, irregularities and vote-buying during the election.

After losing the election, he once again faced major problem when part of the town's public market was burned down on May 23, 2025. This resulted in many business establishments left destroyed by the fire. San Luis assures assistance for those market vendors whose affected by the fire, respectively.

On June 18, 2025, San Luis suspended the classes from both public and private schools, and the work in the municipal hall and office after an anonymous person posted a bomb threat online threatening the town schools and government offices. Later the threat was confirmed as hoax and the assailant was arrested by the authorities, respectively.

Despite all of these events, during San Luis' leadership the town was awarded with the Seal of Good Local Governance (SGLG) from the Department of Interior and Local Government (DILG) in 2019. The town was also awarded with Good Financial Housekeeping Award in 2019, 2021, 2022, 2023, and lastly in 2024, before his tenure ends.

== Personal life ==
San Luis is married to Doris Laviña of Cabuyao, Laguna. They have four children: Anna Clarissa (Cleng; born 1978), Rai-Ann Agustine (Rai-Ann, born 1983), Francis Joseph (Milo) and Felicisimo Mateo (Bingbong). San Luis resides in Poblacion III, Santa Cruz, Laguna. He is a Roman Catholic. San Luis also plays golf as his sports.

== Controversies ==
=== ‘Bogus’ impeachment complaint ===
After San Luis endorsement of the three-page Impeachment Complaint filed by lawyer Roberto Rafael Pulido against President Arroyo. He was accused of being bribed to endorse the ‘bogus’ complaint so the Pro-Estrada opposition would be barred from filing their own complaint to the House of Representatives, respectively.

=== PDAF scam ===
San Luis was accused, along with other lawmakers, of being involved in the Priority Development Assistance Fund (PDAF) scam (Pork barrel scam) of Janet Lim-Napoles, a Filipina businesswoman who was believed to be the mastermind of the scam. As stated by the whistleblowers, he got 100 million pesos from the Congressional Pork barrel system.

=== Fake COMELEC staffs ===
Prior to the 2025 elections, San Luis was once again involved in a controversy. This time over the arrested fake COMELEC staff and NBI agents. He was alleged as one of the masterminds of the fake staff and agents so that they could favor the election results for them. San Luis denied the allegations against him.
