= Laarni =

Laarni is a feminine given name.

== People with the given name ==
- Laarni Lozada, Filipino singer
- Laarni Malibiran, Filipina educator and politician
- Laarni Roque, Filipino politician

== See also ==
- Larni
