= Efforts to impeach Gloria Macapagal Arroyo =

Efforts to impeach the 14th President of the Philippines

Gloria Macapagal-Arroyo (often referred to as GMA) served as president of the Philippines from 2001 to 2010. During and after her presidency she faced multiple impeachment complaints (2005-2008), three high-profile military uprisings or coup attempts (the Oakwood mutiny, Oplan HACKLE, and the Manila Peninsula siege), and large protest moments tied to controversies such as EDSA III, the Hello Garci scandal, and the NBN–ZTE deal corruption scandal. None of the impeachment complaints advanced to a Senate trial; the House of Representatives dismissed them at various stages.

== Background ==
From January 16 to 20, 2001, protests known as EDSA II, or the Second EDSA Revolution, culminated in Arroyo taking her oath as the 14th president of the Philippines. During her first term, a Social Weather Stations survey reported 42% satisfaction and 18% dissatisfaction with her performance. Arroyo won the 2004 presidential election. In 2005, the leak of a phone call later referred to as Hello, Garci revealed a vote-rigging scandal and sparked major controversy.

== Impeachment complaints ==
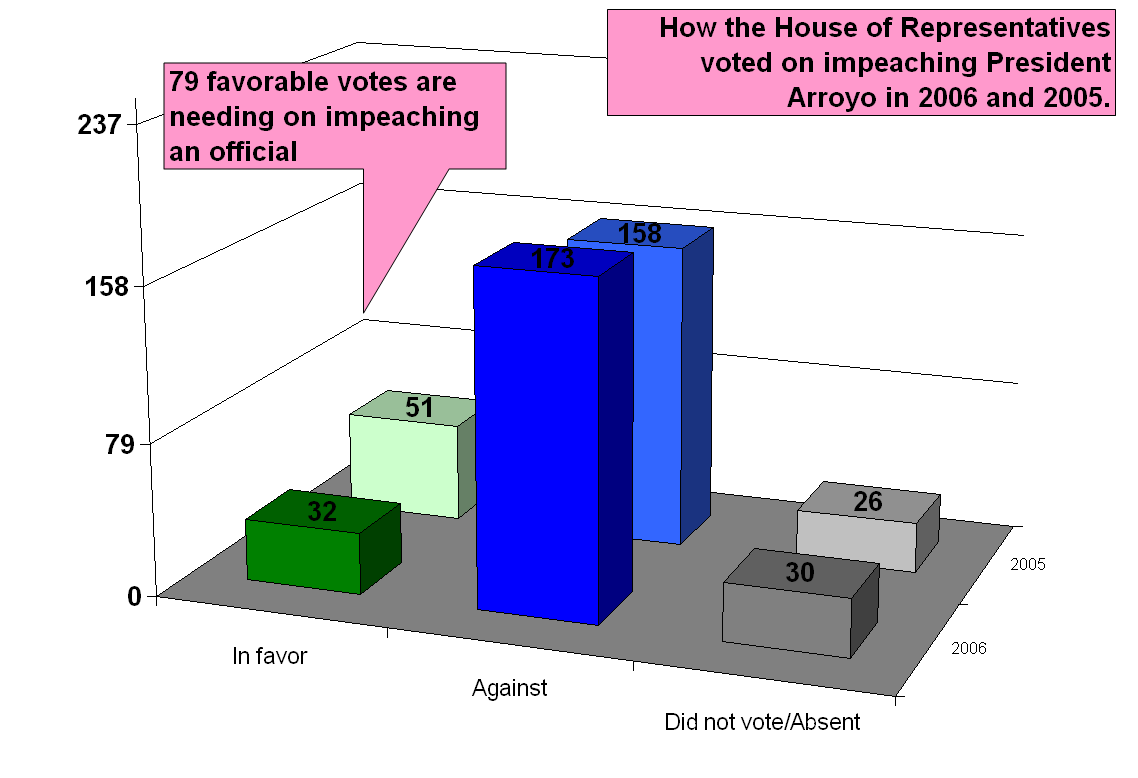
Votes for the impeachment of Arroyo in the House of Representatives.

=== 2005 ===
On July 27, 2005, in the wake of the Hello, Garci scandal, lawyer Oliver Lozano filed an impeachment complaint alleging betrayal of public trust and electoral fraud; it was endorsed by Representative Rodante Marcoleta.

Although the complaint drew numerous endorsements, the House Committee on Justice ruled it insufficient because it did not meet the constitutional threshold of one-third of House members. Speaker Jose de Venecia Jr. later announced he had enough signatures to block the complaint. After a marathon debate, the House voted to dismiss the complaint; protests followed, and some public figures, including former President Corazon Aquino, called for Arroyo to resign.

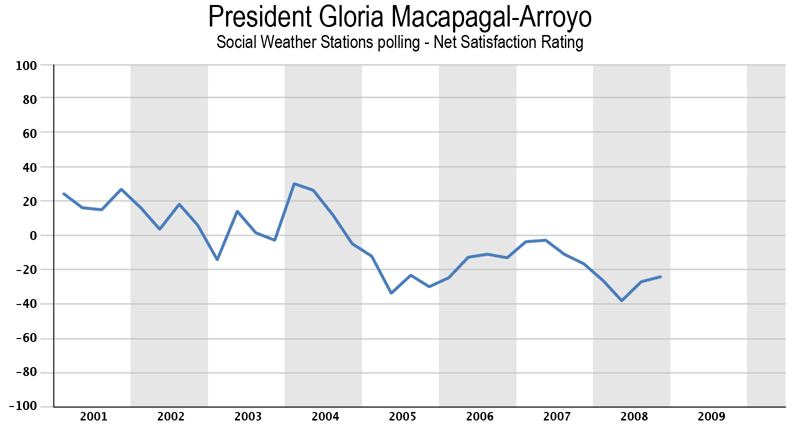
Net satisfaction rating ("satisfied" minus "dissatisfied") of Philippine President Gloria Macapagal-Arroyo, based on quarterly polling of Social Weather Stations.

=== 2006 ===
Civil society and opposition groups prepared a new complaint in mid-2006. Arroyo’s counsel, Romulo Macalintal and Alberto Agra, argued that the prior case still had a pending petition, and House support again fell short of the required signatures. The complaint was ultimately dismissed by the Committee on Justice.

=== 2007 ===
On October 5, 2007, lawyer Roel Pulido filed a complaint related to the $329 million ZTE contract; Representative Edgar San Luis endorsed it, and the case was referred to the Committee on Justice. A second complaint, filed November 12 and citing alleged abductions of government critics, was likewise rejected amid expectations that the House majority would block any impeachment move.

=== 2008 ===
On October 14, 2008, Bayan Muna's Neri Colmenares and others filed a complaint alleging betrayal of public trust, constitutional violations, bribery, graft, and related offenses, referencing the Fertilizer Fund scam, the Hello Garci scandal, and alleged cash gifts in 2007. The House minority opposed the complaint, and on November 4, former Speaker Jose de Venecia III filed a separate case. The Committee on Justice voted 42–8 to find the latter "insufficient in substance," and both efforts failed to advance.

== Ouster plots ==
=== Oakwood mutiny ===
At about 1:00 a.m. PHT on July 27, 2003, roughly 300 soldiers calling themselves the Magdalo Group occupied the Oakwood Premiere in Makati, demanded Arroyo's resignation, and alleged corrupted in the armed forces. They disarmed the security guards, planted claymore mines around the building, and threatened to set off the explosives if the government attacked. After negotiations and a day-long standoff, the group surrendered that evening. The leaders of the mutiny, including Navy Lt. Antonio Trillanes, faced coup d’etat charges.

=== Oplan HACKLE and Coup d'état attempt ===
On February 24, 2006, amid reports of a planned uprising involving soldiers and opposition figures, authorities detained senior officers including Brig. Gen. Danilo Lim. The government declared a one-week state of national emergency as protests escalated. A Magdalo soldier later confirmed the existence of "Oplan HACKLE," a plan to unseat Arroyo reportedly discussed over several months.

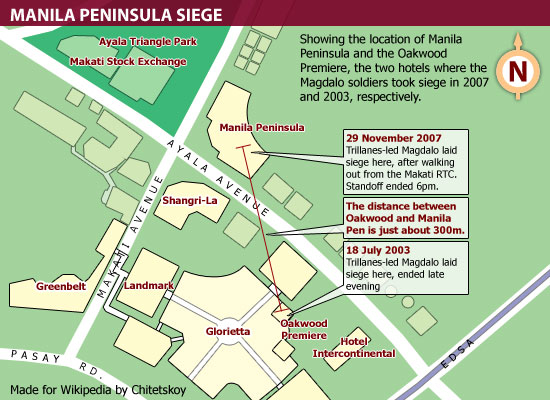
Map covering the places where the Manila Peninsula siege and Oakwood mutiny took place.

=== Manila Peninsula siege ===
On November 29, 2007, during their coup case hearing, Trillanes, Lim, and others walked out of court and proceeded to the Manila Peninsula hotel, where they called for Arroyo’s resignation. Authorities set a surrender deadline, cordoned off the area, and used an armored vehicle to enter the hotel. After a seven-hour standoff, the group surrendered; charges followed.

== Protests ==
=== EDSA III protests ===
Following the April 25, 2001 arrest of former president Joseph Estrada, allied groups (including Iglesia ni Cristo leaders, the Puwersa ng Masa alliance, and pro-Estrada supporters) organized mass actions that peaked at an estimated 100,000 people on May 1 before dispersing.

=== Hello Garci scandal protests ===
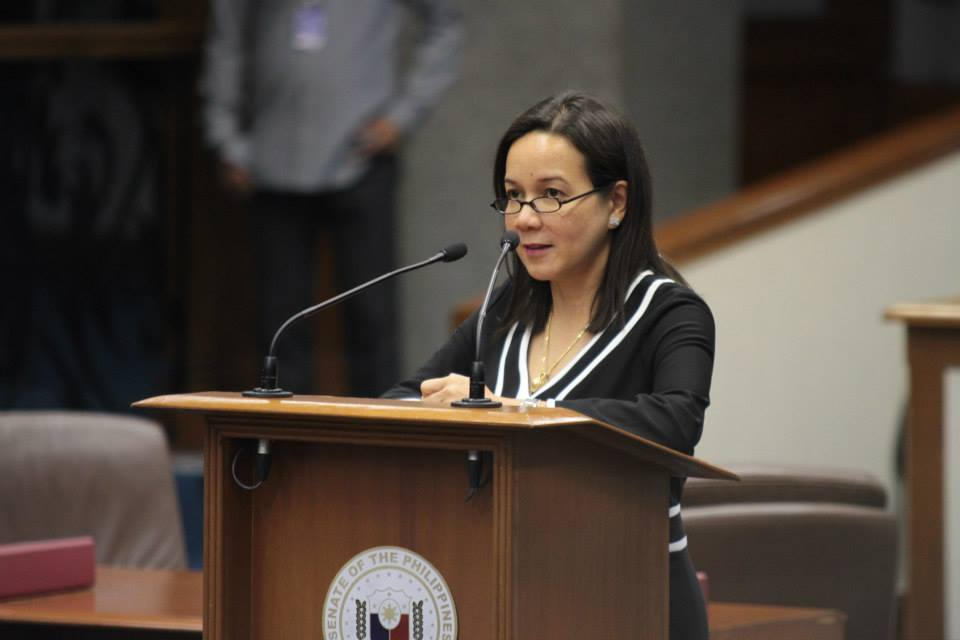
Senator Grace Poe delivering a speech in the ten-year anniversary of the Hello Garci scandal.

Protests linked to the "Hello, Garci" recordings began in June 2005 and recurred through the year, with rallies in Makati and in other locations calling for Arroyo’s resignation or a new election. Counter-rallies were also held. Demonstrations continued into early 2006 alongside reports of coup plots..

=== NBN-ZTE scandal protests ===
In 2007–2008, the government’s broadband contract with ZTE drew scrutiny and prompted investigations and protests. Large rallies supported whistleblowers such as Jun Lozada and called for accountability, including events in Makati, at La Salle Green Hills, and among Filipino communities overseas. On February 24, Filipino groups that formed a coalition calling for Arroyo's resignation conducted an interfaith prayer rally in Chater Road in Central, Hong Kong.

== See also ==
- Efforts to impeach Rodrigo Duterte
- Trial of Joseph Estrada
- People Power Revolution
