= Laarni Malibiran =

Filipina educator and politician (born 1979)

The Honorable Laarni Malibiran AB
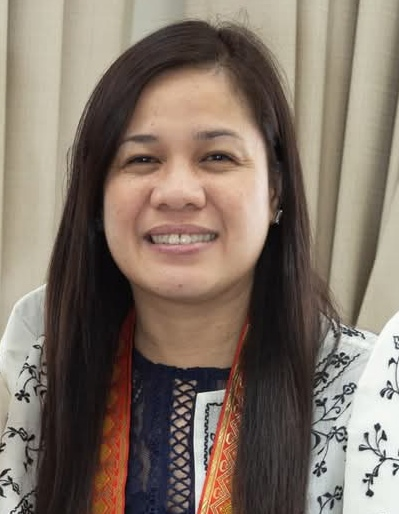
- Malibiran in 2024.

Vice Mayor of Santa Cruz
- Incumbent
- Assumed office June 30, 2019
- Mayor: Edgar San Luis (2019–2025); Benjo Agarao (2025–present)
- Preceded by: Louie De Leon

Member of the Santa Cruz Municipal Council
- In office June 30, 2010 – June 30, 2019
- Constituency: At-large

Personal details
- Born: Laarni Canoy Aguilar; September 8, 1979 (age 47) Santa Cruz, Laguna
- Party: Independent (since 2022; 2015–2018)
- Other political affiliations: PROMDI (2021–2022); PDP–Laban (2019–2021); KDP (2018–2019); UNA (2012–2015); Lakas–CMD (2010–2012)
- Spouse: Julius Malibiran (m. 2002)
- Children: 3
- Education: Centro Escolar University (AB)
- Occupation: Educator; Politician

Laarni Canoy Aguilar-Malibiran (born September 8, 1979) is a Filipina educator and politician. She currently serves as Vice Mayor of Santa Cruz, Laguna since June 30, 2019. Before being elected as Vice Mayor, she firstly served as a member of the Municipal Council from June 30, 2010, until June 30, 2019.

== Early life and education ==
Laarni Canoy Aguilar was born on September 8, 1979, in Santa Cruz, Laguna. Her father was Andres Estrada Aguilar, and her mother was Zenaida Guevarra Canoy. Malibiran has six siblings, namely: Arthur, Aileen, Cherry, Eryle, Barbz and Mayu.

Aguilar went to Santisima Cruz Elementary School in Santa Cruz, Laguna, where she completed her primary education in 1992 with a 2nd honorable mention. She finished her secondary education at the Pedro Guevara Memorial High School also located in Santa Cruz, Laguna, where she graduated in 1996. She graduated in 2000 as a University Scholar at the Centro Escolar University in Manila with Bachelor of Arts degree in Mass Communication major in broadcasting, where she also obtained her Masteral's in Bachelor of Arts degree in teaching in 2008.

== Early career ==
While still in Santisima Cruz Elementary School, she served as the Vice President of the Graduating students in 1992. In 1993, she also served as the Club President of the Sophomore Class Organization in Pedro Guevara Memorial National High School, she also served as Chairwoman of the Senior Planning Board of Girl Scouts Laguna Council from 1993 to 1994 and in 1994 she was awarded as a Chief Girl Scout Medalist, the highest award given to a Girl Scout in the Philippines. Later on, she would serve as President of both Junior and Senior Class Organization's in 1994 and 1995. She also served as the Student Council Vice President from 1995 to 1996. While in Centro Escolar University, she served as a Youth Councilor during the Linggo ng Kabataan (lit. 'Youth Week') in 1999 and would later be Secretary of CEU Graduate School in 2003 until 2004. She also worked as a university Professor at the Philippine College of Health Sciences, a private university in Manila for a short period of time (2003–2004). After obtaining her Master's degree in Bachelor of Arts in teaching, in 2008 she worked as a Professor in the AMA Computer University in Santa Cruz, Laguna. She would later resign to pursue her career in Politics.

== Political career ==
Malibiran's first stint in politics was during the 2010 Philippine elections, when she ran for a seat in the Santa Cruz Municipal Council. She ran under the administration party, Lakas–KAMPI and joined the slate of then-Mayor Ariel Magcalas who's seeking re-election.

=== Member, Municipal Council ===
The first position Malibiran held was as a member of the Municipal Council of Santa Cruz, Laguna, she served from June 30, 2010, until June 30, 2019, respectively.

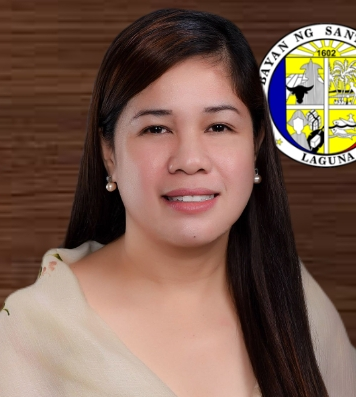
Malibiran's portrait in 2019.

==== Elections ====
On May 11, 2010, Malibiran was proclaimed and elected to the Santa Cruz Municipal Council during the 2010 Santa Cruz local elections, placing fourth of 29 candidate's for the position and garnered 13,875 votes of the total votes counted. She along with Councilor Laura Obligacion are the only female elected and served in the council.

In October 2012, she filed her Certificate of Candidacy for re-election under the opposition's United Nationalist Alliance. Later-on she once again joined the slate of former Mayor Magcalas, whose seeking a Political comeback, after his loss in 2010. On May 14, 2013, she was proclaimed and re-elected to the same post, now placing second of 25 candidate's for the position and garnered 21,849 votes of the total votes counted. She was re-elected once again alongside Councilor Obligacion.

In October 2015, she filed once again her Certificate of Candidacy for re-election, she run as an independent but was backed by the United Nationalist Alliance and by former Mayor Magcalas, whose once again seeking the post he'd served of. On May 10, 2016, she was proclaimed and re-elected to a third and final term. She placed first of 13 candidate's and garnered 33,122 votes of the total votes counted.

==== Tenure ====
Upon assuming to her Council seat, she was appointed as the chairperson of the Committee on Education and Culture and Committee on Social Welfare Development, serving from June 30, 2010. She would later serve as the Auditor of the Philippine Councilors League – Laguna Chapter from August 30, 2010, until June 30, 2013, and as Regional Board of Director of the Calabarzon Chapter.

As she reassumed her seat, she was once again appointed as the Chairperson of the Committee on Education and Culture on June 30, 2013. She also served as the Laguna Chapter President of National Movement of Young Legislators from 2013 until 2016 and served as a Board of Director of the Philippine Councilors League – Laguna Chapter from 2013 to 2016.

After assuming her third and final term, she was once again reappointed as the chairperson of the Committee on Education and Culture on June 30, 2016, until June 30, 2019, in which she held the position for nine years straight. She later served as the Vice President of the Philippine Councilors League – Laguna Chapter from 2016 until 2019 and later-on as a Regional Board of Director of the Calabarzon Chapter. She also served as the Municipal Chapter President of the Santa Cruz Lady Local Legislators League from 2016 to 2019 and also as the Provincial Chapter Treasurer of the Laguna Lady Local Legislators League on the same time period. She also served as the Vice President of the International Affairs of the Laguna Council from 2016 until 2019.

=== Municipal Vice Mayor ===
Pursuant to the Philippine Constitution, Malibiran is barred from seeking a fourth consecutive term as a member of the Municipal Council, she ran and won for the position of Vice Mayor of Santa Cruz serving since June 30, 2019.

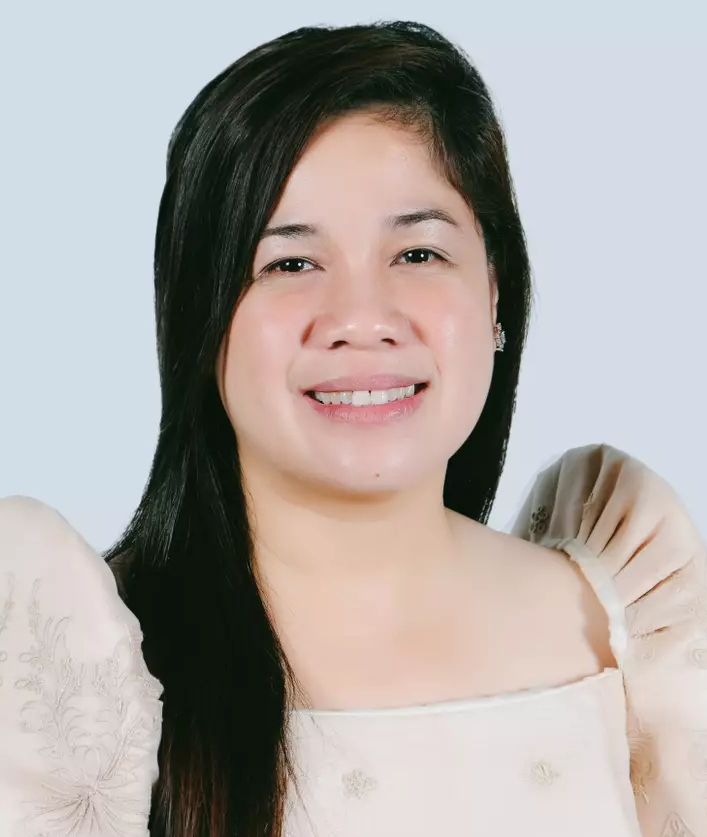
Malibiran's vice mayoral portrait in 2022.

==== Elections ====
Few months before the filing for the 2019 Philippine general election, Malibiran was invited by former Mayor Ariel Magcalas to an event in Santa Rosa City, where he invited her to seek a seat in the Provincial Board, but she declined the offer and opted to run for Vice Mayor of Santa Cruz.

In October 2018, she formally filed her Certificate of Candidacy for Vice Mayor under the banner of Katipunan ng Demokratikong Pilipino, she joined the Team Good Governance of her long-time political ally former Mayor Magcalas, who's once again seeking the Mayorship of the town. On May 13, 2019, she was proclaimed and elected as the second female Vice Mayor of Santa Cruz, Laguna after garnering 23,149 votes (45.38%) of the total votes counted. She defeated the incumbent Mayor Domingo Panganiban of the Nacionalista Party and incumbent Councilor Rizaldy Kalaw of the PDP–Laban via wide margin.

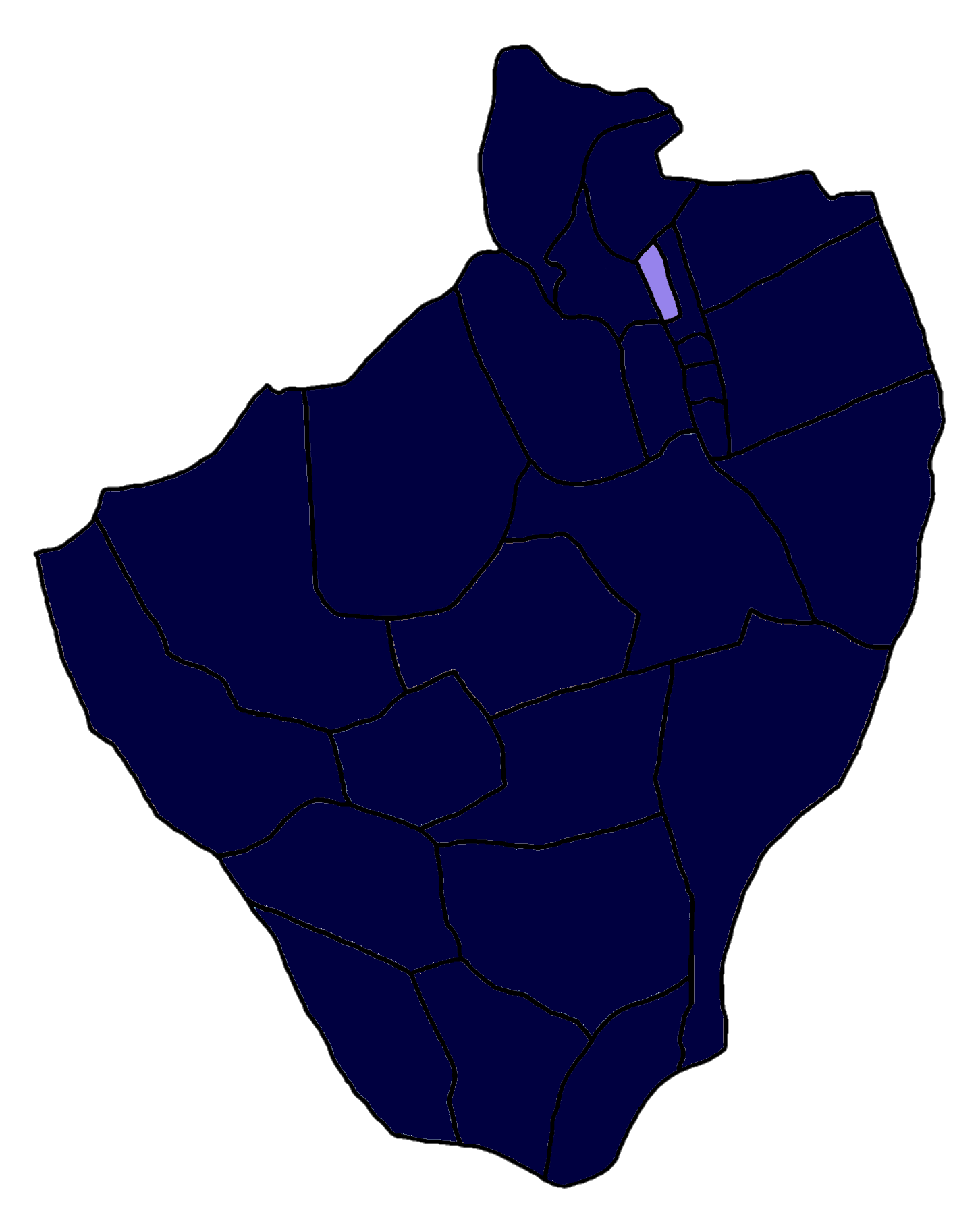
2022 Santa Cruz Vice Mayoralty election results per barangay's. Malibiran De Leon

On October 7, 2021, she filed her Certificate of Candidacy for re-election under the banner of Progressive Movement for the Devolution of Initiatives and joined the Team Tropang pang Masa, the slate of then-Laguna Representative Benjamin Agarao Jr. seeking the Mayorship against the incumbent San Luis. On May 10, 2022, she was proclaimed and re-elected to her position after once again winning via wide margin. Malibiran garnered 37,099 votes (59.74%) against former Vice Mayor and incumbent Councilor Louie De Leon of Aksyon Demokratiko who garnered 24,997 votes (40.26%) of the total votes counted. Malibiran nearly won almost all of the barangays in Santa Cruz, Laguna, except the Poblacion II.

On October 8, 2024, she filed her Certificate of Candidacy for her third and final term for Vice Mayor of Santa Cruz running as an independent politician, but was joined by the slate of incumbent Board Member Benjo Agarao running for Mayor under the administration's Partido Federal ng Pilipinas. She faced former Councilor Laura Obligacion (sister of former Mayor Panganiban) who ran under the National Unity Party.

==== Tenure ====
She assumed the position of the Vice Mayor of Santa Cruz, Laguna on June 30, 2019, and became the town's official second female Vice Mayor, she also became the Presiding officer of the Municipal Council and became an ex-officio member of every Committees. She would also elected as the Secretary-General of the Vice Mayors League of the Philippines – Laguna Chapter and later-on as a Board of Director of the Vice Mayors League of the Philippines – Calabarzon Chapter from 2019.

She was re-elected as Vice Mayor on May 10, 2022, and would later take her oath on June 30, 2022, she still served as the Presiding officer of the Municipal Council and became an ex-officio member of every Committees. On July 22, 2022, during the meeting of the Vice Mayors League of the Philippines – Laguna Chapter, she was elected as the Provincial Chapter Auditor. On September 29, 2022, during the Regional Convention of Vice Mayors League of the Philippines – Calabarzon Chapter at the Diamond Hotel Philippines – Manila, she was duly elected as the Regional Chapter President for the term of 2022 to 2025, succeeding outgoing President Julian Casapao, Vice Mayor of Bauan, Batangas who served from 2019 to 2022.

== Personal life ==
In the early 2000s, Malibiran began dating her long-time friend, Julius Razon Malibiran and would later get married on September 28, 2002. They were blessed with three children, namely Leanne Red, Chanel Kristel and John Lei. Malibiran resides in San Pablo Sur, Santa Cruz, Laguna.

Malibiran is a School Directress of Little Javanna Montessori Academy, a Private school located at Santa Cruz, Laguna, she also served as the Municipal Chapter President of the Girl Scouts of the Philippines from 2013. Malibiran also served as the Program Directress of Paper and Pencil Learning Center.

Her husband, Julius is also a politician and educator, serving as Barangay Kagawad of Santo Angel Sur, Santa Cruz since 2013. He is also the Head of the Finance Department of Little Javanna Montessori Academy.
