= Benjo Agarao =

Filipino businessman and politician

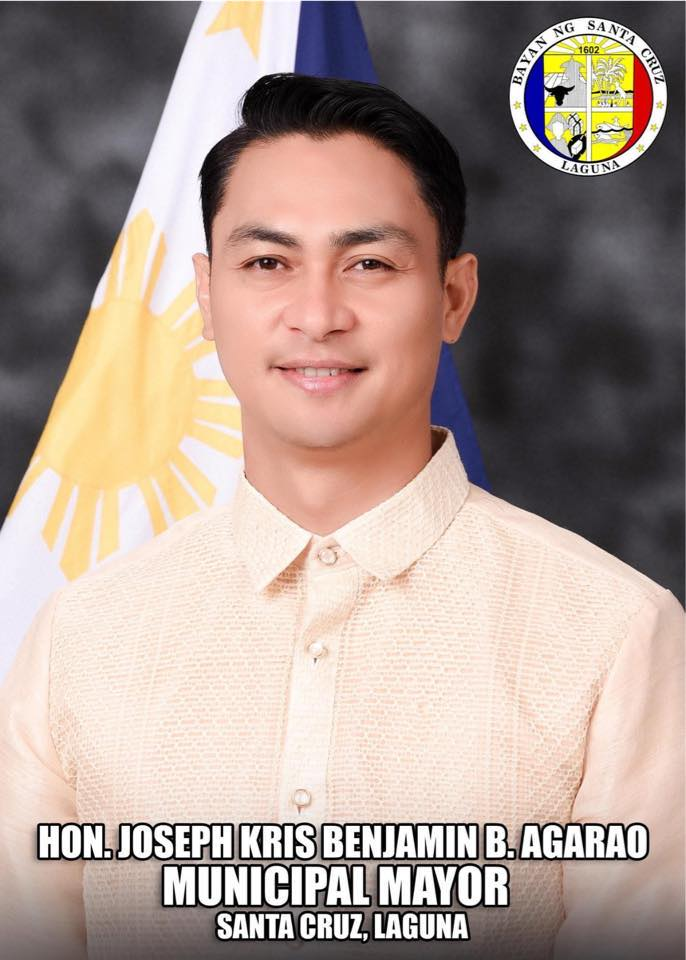
- Official portrait, 2025

Mayor of Santa Cruz
- Incumbent
- Assumed office June 30, 2025
- Vice Mayor: Laarni Malibiran
- Preceded by: Edgar San Luis

Member of the Laguna Provincial Board from the 4th District
- In office June 30, 2022 – June 30, 2025
- In office June 30, 2010 – June 30, 2019

Personal details
- Born: Joseph Kris Benjamin Baltazar Agarao; October 11, 1981 (age 44) Pagsanjan, Laguna, Philippines
- Party: AKAY
- Other political affiliations: PFP (2024–2025); NUP (2021–2024); PDP–Laban (2018–2021); Liberal (2010–2018)
- Spouse: Ellaine Taleon
- Children: 4 (including Krissela (born 2004))
- Parents: Benjamin Agarao Jr. (father); Estelita Baltazar (mother)
- Relatives: Jam Agarao (sister)
- Occupation: Businessman; Politician
- Website: Ka1sa ni Benjo Agarao

Joseph Kris Benjamin Baltazar Agarao (born October 11, 1981) also known as Benjo Agarao, is a Filipino businessman and politician. He is currently serving as Mayor of the Municipality of Santa Cruz, Province of Laguna, having won the majority of votes in the 2025 Midterm National and Local Elections.

== Political career ==
In 2010 election, Agarao ran for a seat in the Laguna Provincial Board for the 4th District. He ran as a candidate of the Liberal Party, joining the ticket of former Laguna governor Joey Lina. Agarao endorsed the Presidential candidacy of then-Senator Benigno Aquino III of the Liberal Party. Agarao won with 107,940 votes (or 31.48%) of the total votes counted. He served with Benedicto Mario Palacol Jr. of the Lakas–KAMPI. Agarao was re-elected in 2013 and 2016 elections under the Liberal Party.

In 2019, being term-limited, Agarao ran for mayor of the Santa Cruz, Laguna election, running under PDP–Laban. He lost to former Laguna's representative Edgar San Luis of the Nacionalista Party. Agarao garnered 23,547 votes against San Luis' 25,075 votes of San Luis.

Agarao returned into a private life as a businessman. He later ran for Board Member for the 2022 election under the National Unity Party and became the top-notcher (Senior Board Member) of the chamber. He garnered 186,326 votes, serving with Francis Joseph San Luis of Aksyon Demokratiko.

On April 6, 2024, Agarao joined the Partido Federal ng Pilipinas. In June 2024, Agarao confirmed that he will run for mayor of Santa Cruz for the upcoming 2025 elections.

== Personal life ==
Joseph Kris Benjamin Baltazar Agarao was born on October 11, 1979, in Santa Cruz, Laguna. His father is Benjamin Agarao Jr., who served as the district representative of Laguna's fourth district from 2013 to 2022 and previously from 2004 to 2007, and his mother is Estelita Agarao. Agarao is an Aglipayan.

Agarao is married to Ellaine Talleon; together they have four daughters.

== Electoral history ==
Electoral history of Benjo Agarao
| Year | Office | Party | Votes received | | | | Result |
| Year | Office | Party | Total | % | P. | Swing | Result |
|---|---|---|---|---|---|---|---|
| 2010 | Board Member (Laguna–4th) | Liberal | 107,940 | 31.48% | 1st | —N/a | Won |
| 2013 | Board Member (Laguna–4th) | Liberal | 112,301 | 35.90% | 1st | —N/a | Won |
| 2016 | Board Member (Laguna–4th) | Liberal | 135,410 | 45.04% | 1st | —N/a | Won |
| 2022 | Board Member (Laguna–4th) | NUP | 186,326 | 47.62% | 1st | —N/a | Won |
| 2019 | Mayor of Santa Cruz | PDP–Laban | 23,547 | 45.16% | 2nd | —N/a | Lost |
| 2025 | Mayor of Santa Cruz | PFP | 34,944 | 52.46% | 1st | —N/a | Won |
