= Don Bosco College, Canlubang =

Roman Catholic college in Laguna, Philippines

- Kolehiyo ng Don Bosco, Canlubang (Filipino)
- Former name: Don Bosco Seminary-College
- Motto: Ad Maiora Natus (Latin)
- Motto in English: Born For Greater Things
- Type: Private, Catholic Non-profit Coeducational Basic and Higher education institution
- Established: 1963; 63 years ago
- Founder: Salesians of the Society of Saint John Bosco
- Religious affiliation: Roman Catholic (Salesians)
- Rector: Fr. Jeffrey Mangubat, SDB
- Principal: Bernadette Salonga (Grade School & High School); Veronica Castillo (Senior High School & TVET)
- Dean: Fr. Onofre Inocencio, Jr., SDB
- Technical Director: Fr. Paul Michael Suarez, SDB
- Faculty: 250 (approximate)
- Students: approx. 2000
- Location: Jose Yulo Sr. Blvd, Canlubang, Calamba, Laguna, Philippines; 14°12′37″N 121°06′59″E
- Campus: Suburban, 13 hectares (130,000 m^{2})
- Colors: Blue & gold
- Mascot: Gray Wolf named Grigio
- Website: donboscocanlubang.edu.ph

- Location within Laguna Location within Luzon Location within Philippines

Don Bosco College, Canlubang, also referred to by its acronym DBC, is a private Catholic basic and higher educational institution owned and operated by the Salesians of the Society of Saint John Bosco in Canlubang, Laguna, Philippines. It was established in 1963 by the Salesians.

== History ==
In 1967, the Philippine government recognized that the courses in the institution were valid for a degree in Bachelor in Secondary Education (BSEd). Two years later, the school's curriculum for the course in Bachelor of Science in Industrial Education (BSIEd) was also approved. In 1972, the institution started an outreach program called Manpower Training Department (MTD), now called TVET, for low-income students.

== Members of the Salesian Community ==
- Fr. Jm , SDB, Rector
- Fr. Uly Rimbawa, SDB, Economer & TVET Director
- Br. Roj Mallari, SDB, Brother Assistant
- Fr. Jun Lingad, SDB, Confessor
- Fr. Paul Dungca, SDB, BED Spiritual Director
- Fr. Bob Zarate, SDB, Institutional Pastoral Affairs & HEI Spiritual Director
