= Jam Agarao =

Filipina politician (born 1987)

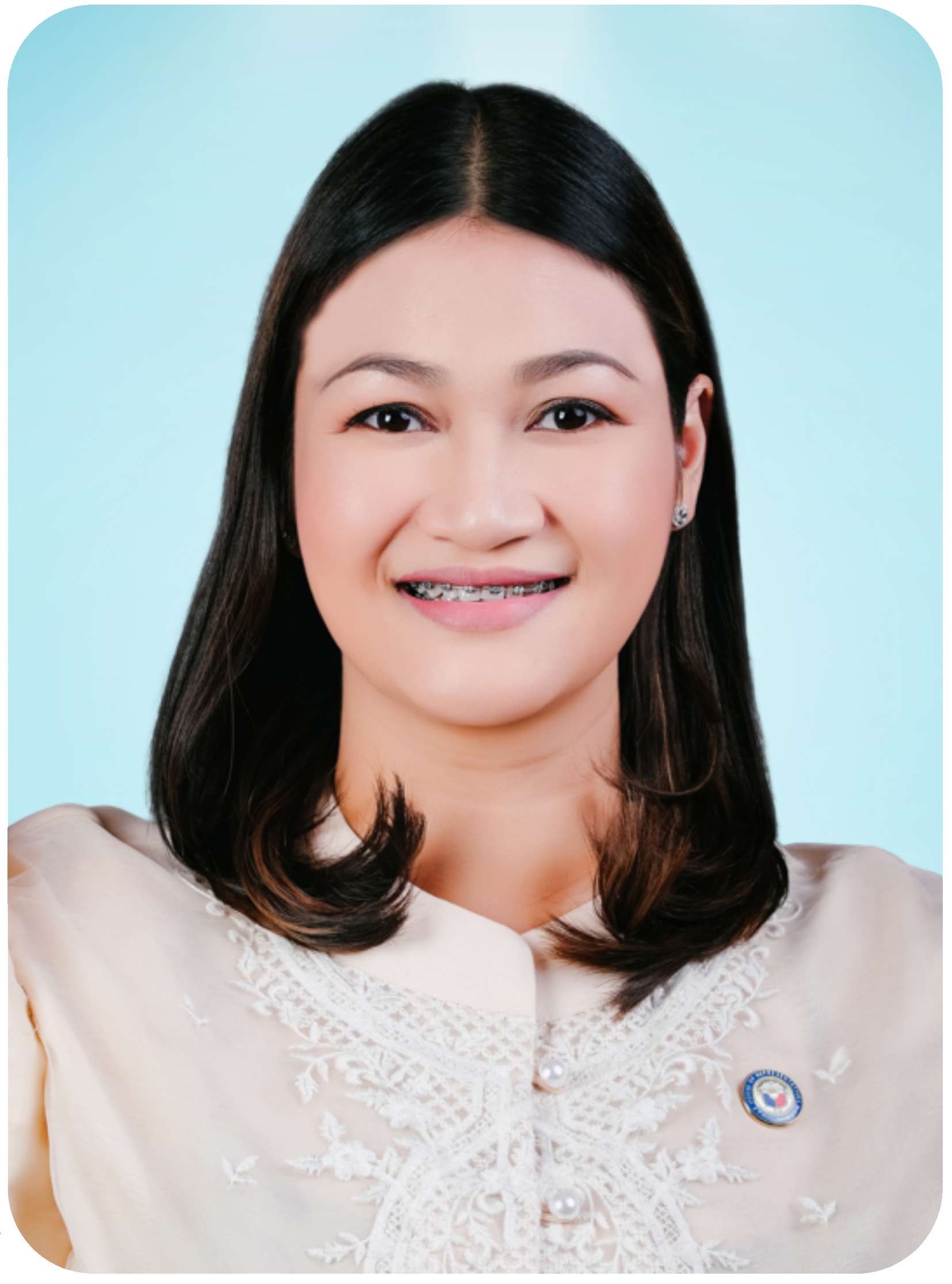
- Official portrait, 2022

Member of the Laguna Provincial Board from the 4th district
- Incumbent
- Assumed office June 30, 2025
- In office June 30, 2019 – June 30, 2022

Member of the Philippine House of Representatives from Laguna's 4th district
- In office June 30, 2022 – June 30, 2025
- Preceded by: Benjamin Agarao Jr.
- Succeeded by: Benjamin Agarao Jr.

Personal details
- Born: Maria Jamina Katherine Baltazar Agarao; December 6, 1987 (age 38) Pagsanjan, Laguna, Philippines
- Party: AKAY (2026–present)
- Other political affiliations: PDP–Laban (2018–2022); Lakas–CMD (2022–2023); PFP (2023–2026)
- Spouse: Nolan Oloroso (m. 2022)
- Children: 1
- Parent: Benjamin Agarao Jr. (father)
- Relatives: Benjo Agarao (brother)
- Education: Colegio de San Juan de Letran Calamba (BSN)
- Occupation: Nurse; politician
- Website: Hon. Agarao-Oloroso, Ma. Jamina Katherine B.

Maria Jamina Katherine Baltazar Agarao-Oloroso (born December 6, 1987), also known as Jam Agarao, is a Filipina nurse and politician who has been a member of the Laguna Provincial Board from the 4th district since 2025, previously serving on the board from 2019 to 2022. Agarao was a member of the Philippine House of Representatives representing Laguna's 4th district from 2022 to 2025.

== Early life ==
Born in Santa Cruz, Laguna, Philippines, Agarao is the daughter of Benjamin Agarao Jr., former congressman from Laguna's 4th district, and Estelita Agarao.

== Political life ==
=== Provincial Board Member (2019–2022) ===
In the 2019 elections, Agarao ran for the Laguna Provincial Board under the 4th district and won.

=== House of Representatives (2022–2025) ===
In the 2022 elections, Agarao ran for congresswoman for Laguna's 4th district to succeed her father, who was running for mayor of Santa Cruz. Agarao won 153,495 votes; her opponent was former Santa Maria Mayor Antonio "Tony" Carolino, who got 153,267. The margin of the votes was only 228, or 0.08%, making it the narrowest win in the 2022 Philippine House of Representatives elections. She was the youngest and first female representative for Laguna's 4th district. She served in the House of Representatives until 2025, when she chose to instead contest the provincial board election. Her father was re-elected to the House in her place.

=== Provincial Board Member (2025–present) ===
In 2025, Agarao was re-elected to a second non-consecutive term as member of the Laguna Provincial Board under the 4th district. She was named as the senior board member.

== Electoral history ==
Year	Office	Party	Votes for Agarao				Result
Year	Office	Party	Votes	%	P.	Swing	Result
2019	Board Member (Laguna–4th)	PDP–Laban	156,588	42.96	1st	N/A	Won
2025	Board Member (Laguna–4th)	PFP	184,487	40.26	1st	N/A	Won
2022	Representatives (Laguna–4th)	PDP–Laban	153,495	50.04	1st	+7.08%	Won
