= Laguna's 4th congressional district =

Filipino congressional district

- Constituency for the House of Representatives of the Philippines
- Boundary of Laguna's 4th congressional district in Laguna

- Location of Laguna within the Philippines
- Province: Laguna
- Region: Calabarzon
- Population: 582,052 (2024)
- Electorate: 451,974 (2025)
- Major settlements: 16 LGUs: Municipalities; Cavinti; Famy; Kalayaan; Luisiana; Lumban; Mabitac; Magdalena; Majayjay; Paete; Pagsanjan; Pakil; Pangil; Pila; Santa Cruz; Santa Maria; Siniloan
- Area: 1,017.91 km^{2} (393.02 sq mi)

Current constituency
- Created: 1987
- Representative: Benjamin Agarao Jr.
- Political party: Partido Federal ng Pilipinas
- Congressional bloc: TBD

Laguna's 4th congressional district is one of the seven congressional districts of the Philippines in the province of Laguna. It has been represented in the House of Representatives of the Philippines since 1987. The district consists of the capital municipality of Santa Cruz and the entire eastern Laguna municipalities of Cavinti, Famy, Kalayaan, Luisiana, Lumban, Mabitac, Magdalena, Majayjay, Paete, Pagsanjan, Pakil, Pangil, Pila, Santa Maria and Siniloan. It is currently represented in the 20th Congress by Benjamin Agarao Jr. of the Partido Federal ng Pilipinas.

== Representation history ==
#	Member		Term of office		Congress	Party	Electoral history	Constituent LGUs
#	Image	Name (birth-death)	Start	End	Congress	Party	Electoral history	Constituent LGUs
=== Laguna's 4th district for the House of Representatives of the Philippines ===
District created February 2, 1987.
1		Magdaleno Palacol Sr. (1918–1997)	June 30, 1987	August 21, 1997	8th	LnB	Elected in 1987.	1987–present Cavinti, Famy, Kalayaan, Luisiana, Lumban, Mabitac, Magdalena, Majayjay, Paete, Pagsanjan, Pakil, Pangil, Pila, Santa Cruz, Santa Maria, Siniloan
1		Magdaleno Palacol Sr. (1918–1997)	June 30, 1987	August 21, 1997	9th	LDP	Re-elected in 1992.	1987–present Cavinti, Famy, Kalayaan, Luisiana, Lumban, Mabitac, Magdalena, Majayjay, Paete, Pagsanjan, Pakil, Pangil, Pila, Santa Cruz, Santa Maria, Siniloan
1		Magdaleno Palacol Sr. (1918–1997)	June 30, 1987	August 21, 1997	10th	LDP	Re-elected in 1995. Died.	1987–present Cavinti, Famy, Kalayaan, Luisiana, Lumban, Mabitac, Magdalena, Majayjay, Paete, Pagsanjan, Pakil, Pangil, Pila, Santa Cruz, Santa Maria, Siniloan
2		Rodolfo San Luis (1946–2010)	June 30, 1998	June 30, 2004	11th	LAMMP	Elected in 1998.	1987–present Cavinti, Famy, Kalayaan, Luisiana, Lumban, Mabitac, Magdalena, Majayjay, Paete, Pagsanjan, Pakil, Pangil, Pila, Santa Cruz, Santa Maria, Siniloan
2		Rodolfo San Luis (1946–2010)	June 30, 1998	June 30, 2004	12th	LDP	Re-elected in 2001.	1987–present Cavinti, Famy, Kalayaan, Luisiana, Lumban, Mabitac, Magdalena, Majayjay, Paete, Pagsanjan, Pakil, Pangil, Pila, Santa Cruz, Santa Maria, Siniloan
3		Benjamin Agarao Jr. (born 1958)	June 30, 2004	June 30, 2007	13th	NPC	Elected in 2004.	1987–present Cavinti, Famy, Kalayaan, Luisiana, Lumban, Mabitac, Magdalena, Majayjay, Paete, Pagsanjan, Pakil, Pangil, Pila, Santa Cruz, Santa Maria, Siniloan
4		Edgar San Luis (born 1955)	June 30, 2007	June 30, 2013	14th	NPC	Elected in 2007.	1987–present Cavinti, Famy, Kalayaan, Luisiana, Lumban, Mabitac, Magdalena, Majayjay, Paete, Pagsanjan, Pakil, Pangil, Pila, Santa Cruz, Santa Maria, Siniloan
4		Edgar San Luis (born 1955)	June 30, 2007	June 30, 2013	15th	NPC	Re-elected in 2010.	1987–present Cavinti, Famy, Kalayaan, Luisiana, Lumban, Mabitac, Magdalena, Majayjay, Paete, Pagsanjan, Pakil, Pangil, Pila, Santa Cruz, Santa Maria, Siniloan
(3)		Benjamin Agarao Jr. (born 1958)	June 30, 2013	June 30, 2022	16th	Liberal	Elected in 2013.	1987–present Cavinti, Famy, Kalayaan, Luisiana, Lumban, Mabitac, Magdalena, Majayjay, Paete, Pagsanjan, Pakil, Pangil, Pila, Santa Cruz, Santa Maria, Siniloan
(3)		Benjamin Agarao Jr. (born 1958)	June 30, 2013	June 30, 2022	17th	Liberal	Re-elected in 2016.	1987–present Cavinti, Famy, Kalayaan, Luisiana, Lumban, Mabitac, Magdalena, Majayjay, Paete, Pagsanjan, Pakil, Pangil, Pila, Santa Cruz, Santa Maria, Siniloan
(3)		Benjamin Agarao Jr. (born 1958)	June 30, 2013	June 30, 2022	18th	PDP–Laban	Re-elected in 2019.	1987–present Cavinti, Famy, Kalayaan, Luisiana, Lumban, Mabitac, Magdalena, Majayjay, Paete, Pagsanjan, Pakil, Pangil, Pila, Santa Cruz, Santa Maria, Siniloan
5		Jam Agarao (born 1988)	June 30, 2022	June 30, 2025	19th	PDP–Laban	Elected in 2022.	1987–present Cavinti, Famy, Kalayaan, Luisiana, Lumban, Mabitac, Magdalena, Majayjay, Paete, Pagsanjan, Pakil, Pangil, Pila, Santa Cruz, Santa Maria, Siniloan
5		Jam Agarao (born 1988)	June 30, 2022	June 30, 2025	19th	Lakas	Elected in 2022.	1987–present Cavinti, Famy, Kalayaan, Luisiana, Lumban, Mabitac, Magdalena, Majayjay, Paete, Pagsanjan, Pakil, Pangil, Pila, Santa Cruz, Santa Maria, Siniloan
5		Jam Agarao (born 1988)	June 30, 2022	June 30, 2025	19th	PFP	Elected in 2022.	1987–present Cavinti, Famy, Kalayaan, Luisiana, Lumban, Mabitac, Magdalena, Majayjay, Paete, Pagsanjan, Pakil, Pangil, Pila, Santa Cruz, Santa Maria, Siniloan
(3)		Benjamin Agarao Jr. (born 1958)	June 30, 2025	Incumbent	20th	PFP	Elected in 2025.	1987–present Cavinti, Famy, Kalayaan, Luisiana, Lumban, Mabitac, Magdalena, Majayjay, Paete, Pagsanjan, Pakil, Pangil, Pila, Santa Cruz, Santa Maria, Siniloan

== Election results ==
=== 2025 ===
2025 Philippine House of Representatives election
Party	Candidate	Votes	%
PFP	Benjamin Agarao Jr.	150,553	50.06
NUP	Antonio Carolino	150,217	49.94
Total votes		300,770	100
PFP hold			

=== 2022 ===
2022 Philippine House of Representatives elections
Party	Candidate	Votes	%
PDP–Laban	Ma. Jamina Katherine Agarao	153,495	50.04
Aksyon	Antonio Carolino	153,267	49.96
Total votes		306,762	100.00
PDP–Laban hold			

=== 2019 ===
2019 Philippine House of Representatives elections
Party	Candidate	Votes	%
PDP–Laban	Benjamin Agarao Jr. (Incumbent)	146,602	58.06
Nacionalista	Antonio Carolino	105,886	41.94
Total votes		252,488	100.00
PDP–Laban hold			

=== 2016 ===
2016 Philippine House of Representatives elections
Party	Candidate	Votes	%
Liberal	Benjamin Agarao Jr. (Incumbent)	137,058	57.55
NUP	Edgar San Luis	99,262	41.68
UNA	Fidel Santos	1,803	0.75
Total votes		238,123	100.00
Liberal hold			

=== 2013 ===
2013 Philippine House of Representatives elections
Party	Candidate	Votes	%
Liberal	Benjamin Agarao Jr.	91,530	46.28
Nacionalista	Antonio Carolino	79,531	40.21
PDP–Laban	Benedicto Palacol Jr.	26,709	13.51
Total votes		219,171	100.00
Liberal hold			

=== 2010 ===
2010 Philippine House of Representatives elections
Party	Candidate	Votes	%
NPC	Edgar San Luis (Incumbent)	181,930	100.00
Valid ballots		181,930	77.76
Invalid or blank votes		52,023	22.24
Total votes		233,953	100.00
NPC hold			

=== 2007 ===
2007 Philippine House of Representatives elections
Party	Candidate	Votes	%
Independent	Edgar San Luis	55,991	49.17
Liberal	Benjamin Agarao Jr. (Incumbent)	48,189	43.32
Independent	Eufemio Lagumbay	9,684	8.05
Total votes		113,864	100.00
Independent gain from Liberal			

=== 2004 ===
2004 Philippine House of Representatives elections
Party	Candidate	Votes	%
LDP	Benjamin Agarao Jr.	64,685	100.00%
Total votes		64,685	100.00
LDP hold			

=== 2001 ===
2001 Philippine House of Representatives elections
Party	Candidate	Votes	%
LDP	Rodolfo San Luis (Incumbent)	166,262	100.00
Valid ballots		166,262	75.83
Invalid or blank votes		52,995	24.17
Total votes		219,257	100.00
LDP hold			

=== 1995 ===
1995 Philippine House of Representatives elections
Party	Candidate	Votes	%
LDP	Magdaleno Palacol (Incumbent)	102,495	51.10
Lakas	Rodolfo San Luis	98,077	48.90
Total votes		200,572	100.00
LDP hold			

== See also ==
- Legislative districts of Laguna
