= Benjamin Agarao Jr. =

Filipino polititcian (born 1957)

Benjie Agarao
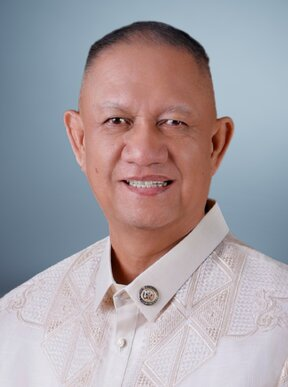
- Official portrait, 2025

Member of the Philippine House of Representatives from Laguna's 4th district
- Incumbent
- Assumed office June 30, 2025
- Preceded by: Jam Agarao
- In office June 30, 2013 – June 30, 2022
- Preceded by: Edgar San Luis
- Succeeded by: Jam Agarao
- In office June 30, 2004 – June 30, 2007
- Preceded by: Rodolfo San Luis
- Succeeded by: Edgar San Luis

Member of the Laguna Provincial Board from the 4th district
- In office June 30, 2001 – June 30, 2004
- In office June 30, 1992 – June 30, 1995

Personal details
- Born: Benjamin Cueto Agarao Jr. October 1, 1957 (age 68) Lumban, Laguna, Philippines
- Party: PFP (2023–present)
- Other political affiliations: PDP–Laban (2018–2023); Liberal (2010–2018); NPC (2007–2010); LDP (2004–2007)
- Spouse: Estelita Agarao (m. 1981)
- Children: 4 (including Benjo and Jam)
- Parents: Benjamin Agarao Sr. (father); Nydia Cueto (mother)
- Relatives: Ma. Meg Agarao–Espiritu (sister)
- Occupation: Politician, businessman

Benjamin Cueto "Benjie" Agarao Jr. (born October 1, 1957) is a Filipino politician and businessman who has served as Member of the Philippine House of Representatives from Laguna's 4th district since 2025, previously holding the seat from 2004 until 2007, and from 2013 until 2022. He also served a board member of Laguna from the same district from 1992 to 1995 and from 2001 to 2004.

== Political career ==
Agarao served as the board member of Laguna from the 4th district from 1992 to 1995 and 2001 to 2004. He served as the congressman for Laguna's 4th congressional district for five terms, from 2004 to 2007, 2013 to 2022, and 2025 to present under the Laban ng Demokratikong Pilipino (LDP), the Liberal Party of the Philippines (LP), and PDP-Laban.

He ran for mayor of Santa Cruz, Laguna, with PDP-Laban, losing to the incumbent Edgar San Luis.

Agarao transferred from PDP-Laban to the Partido Federal ng Pilipinas (PFP).

== Electoral history ==
Electoral history of Benjamin Agarao Jr.
Election Year	Position	Party	Votes for Agarao				Result
Election Year	Position	Party	Total	%	Plc.	Swing	Result
1992	Board Member (Laguna–4th)	NPC	38,309	39.21%	2nd	—N/a	Won
1995	Representative (Laguna–4th)	Lakas–NUCD	31,838	23.82%	2nd	—N/a	Lost
1998	Board Member (Laguna–4th)	Independent	56,024	40.56%	4th	—N/a	Lost
2001	Board Member (Laguna–4th)	LDP	67,390	52.75%	1st	+12.19%	Won
2004	Representative (Laguna–4th)	LDP	64,685	35.08%	1st	—N/a	Won
2007	Representative (Laguna–4th)	Liberal	96,038	48.46%	2nd	+13.38%	Lost
2010	Mayor of Santa Cruz	Liberal	13,867	33.06%	2nd	—N/a	Lost
2013	Representative (Laguna–4th)	Liberal	91,530	46.28%	1st	—N/a	Won
2016	Representative (Laguna–4th)	Liberal	137,058	57.55%	1st	+11.27%	Won
2019	Representative (Laguna–4th)	PDP–Laban	146,602	58.06%	1st	+0.51%	Won
2022	Mayor of Santa Cruz	PDP–Laban	31,809	49.03%	2nd	—N/a	Lost
2025	Representative (Laguna–4th)	PFP	150,553	50.06%	1st	—N/a	Won

== Controversies ==
In May 2014, Agarao was involved in a controversy regarding a multi-billion-peso scam regarding the Priority Development Assistance Fund (PDAF), however, Agarao denied the alleged "accusation".

In 2015, while in an election campaign for the 2016 elections, the Liberal Party held a rally, also celebrating the birthday of Agarao. Then MMDA Chairman Francis Tolentino invited the dance group Play Girls to entertain the guests, causing controversy.

== Personal life ==
Agarao was born on October 1, 1957, in Santa Cruz, Laguna, he is married to Estelita Agarao, having 4 children with her. Including Benjo Agarao and Jam Agarao, Jam is the current senior board member of the Laguna Provincial Board.
