= Laguna Provincial Board =

Legislative body of the province of Laguna, Philippines

Laguna Provincial Board Sangguniang Panlalawigan ng Laguna

Type
- Type: Unicameral
- Term limits: 3 terms (9 years)

Leadership
- Presiding Officer: Magtangol Jose Carait III, Lakas since June 30, 2025
- Senior Board Member: Maria Jamina Katherine Agarao, AKAY since June 30, 2025

Structure
- Seats: 13 board members 1 ex officio presiding officer
- Political groups: NUP (6) Lakas (5) PFP (2) KNP (1) NPC (1) AKAY (1) Nonpartisan (1)
- Length of term: 3 years
- Authority: Local Government Code of the Philippines

Elections
- Voting system: Multiple non-transferable vote (regular members); Indirect election (ex officio members)
- Last election: May 12, 2025
- Next election: May 8, 2028

Meeting place
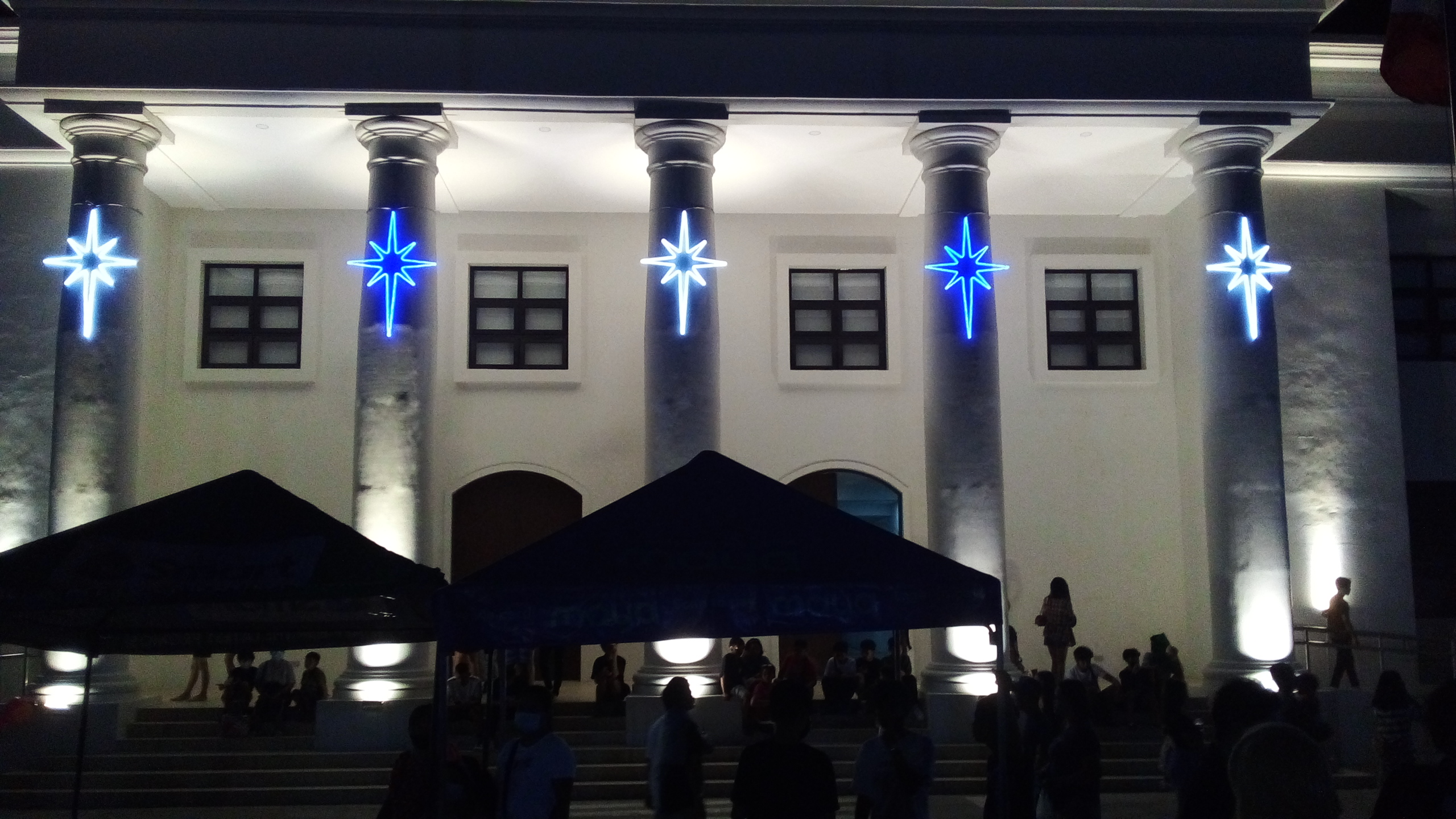
- New Sangguniang Panlalawigan Building, Santa Cruz

The Laguna Provincial Board (Filipino: Sangguniang Panlalawigan ng Laguna) is the Sangguniang Panlalawigan (provincial legislature) of the Philippine province of Laguna.

The members are elected via plurality-at-large voting: the province is divided into four legislative districts, the first and the second sending three members each and the third and fourth sending two members each; the number of the members the electorate votes depends on the number of members their district sends. The candidates with the highest number of votes in each district, depending on the number of members the district sends, are elected.

The districts used in appropriation of members is coextensive with the four legislative districts of Laguna, as well as the lone congressional districts of Biñan, Calamba, and Santa Rosa since 2025.

== Apportionment ==
Elections	Seats per district							Ex officio seats	Total seats
Elections	Laguna–1st	Laguna–2nd	Laguna–3rd	Laguna–4th	Biñan	Calamba	Santa Rosa	Ex officio seats	Total seats
until 2022	3	3	2	2	–	–	–	3	13
2025–beyond	2	2	2	2	2	2	2	3	17

== List of members ==
Three additional ex officio members are the presidents of the provincial chapter of the Association of Barangay Captains, of the Sangguniang Kabataan, and of the Philippine Councilors League. The municipal and city (if applicable) presidents of the Association of Barangay Captains and of the Sangguniang Kabataan shall elect amongst themselves their provincial presidents who shall be their representatives at the board.

=== Current members ===
These are the members after the 2025 local elections and 2023 barangay and SK elections:

- Vice Governor: Magtangol Jose Carait III (Lakas)

District / League	Board member	Party	Start of term	End of term
Laguna–1st	Rafael Campos	NUP	June 30, 2025	June 30, 2028
Laguna–1st	Bernadeth Olivares	KNP	June 30, 2025	June 30, 2028
Laguna–2nd	Neptali Bagnes	NUP	June 30, 2025	June 30, 2028
Laguna–2nd	Tito Fortunato Caringal III	NUP	June 30, 2025	June 30, 2028
Laguna–3rd	Karla Monica Adajar-Lajara	Lakas	June 30, 2025	June 30, 2028
Laguna–3rd	Angelica Alarva	PFP	June 30, 2025	June 30, 2028
Laguna–4th	Maria Jamina Katherine Agarao (Senior Board Member)	AKAY	June 30, 2025	June 30, 2028
Laguna–4th	Rai-Ann San Luis	NUP	June 30, 2025	June 30, 2028
Biñan	Wilfredo Bejasa Jr. (Floor Leader)	Lakas	June 30, 2025	June 30, 2028
Biñan	Flaviano “Jigcy” D. Pecaña Jr.	Lakas	June 30, 2025	June 30, 2028
Calamba	Princess Lajara	Lakas	June 30, 2025	June 30, 2028
Calamba	Dyan Espiridion	Lakas	June 30, 2025	June 30, 2028
Santa Rosa	Jose Cartaño	NUP	June 30, 2025	June 30, 2028
Santa Rosa	Arnel Gomez	NPC	June 30, 2025	June 30, 2028
ABC	Lorenzo Zuñiga Jr.	PFP	2023	January 1, 2026
PCL	Arvin L. Manguiat	Lakas	September 4, 2025	June 30, 2028
SK	Bhenj Stephen Felismino	Nonpartisan	November 30, 2023	January 1, 2026

=== Vice Governor ===
Election year	Name	Party
1988	Restituto Luna (Note: Elevated to Governor on December 18, 1992, following the death of Felicisimo San Luis.)	LnB
1992	Restituto Luna	LDP
1992	Teresita S. Lazaro (Note: Board member elevated to Vice Governor.) (Note: Elevated to Governor on January 30, 2001, following the appointment of Joey Lina as Secretary of the Interior and Local Government.)	NPC
1995	Teresita S. Lazaro	LDP
1998	Teresita S. Lazaro	LAMMP
1998	Gat-Ala Alatiit	LAMMP
2001	Dan Fernandez	Lakas
2004	Edwin Olivarez	Lakas
2007	Ramil Hernandez	Nacionalista
2010	Caesar Perez	Lakas–Kampi
2010	Caesar Perez	Akbayan
2013	Ramil Hernandez (Note: Elevated to Governor on May 30, 2014, following the disqualification of E.R. Ejercito.)	Nacionalista
2013	Katherine Agapay	Independent
2016	Katherine Agapay	Nacionalista
2019	Katherine Agapay	PDP–Laban
2022	Katherine Agapay	PDP–Laban
2022	Katherine Agapay	PFP
2025	Magtangol Jose Carait III	Lakas

== All-time members ==
=== 1st District ===
- Cities: Biñan (until 2025), San Pedro, Santa Rosa (until 2025)

Election year	Member (party)	Member (party)	Member (party)
1998	Gat-Ala Alatiit (Note: Elevated to Vice Governor in 2001, following the elevation of Teresita Lazaro to governor.) (LAMMP)	Emilio Tiongco (LAMMP)	Carlos Amendrala (Lakas)
2001	Edwin Olivarez (Lakas)	Emilio Tiongco (Lakas)	Gabnulang Alatiit (PMP)
2004	Gabnulang Alatiit (Lakas)	Marco Sison (Lakas)	Ramon Carillo (Lakas)
2007	Dave Almarinez (Lakas)	Emilio Tiongco (United Opposition)	Ramon Carillo (Lakas)
2010	Carlo Almoro (Lakas–Kampi)	Gabnulang Alatiit (Liberal)	Emilio Tiongco (Lakas–Kampi)
2013	Dave Almarinez (Nacionalista)	Carlo Almoro (PDP–Laban)	Emilio Tiongco (UNA)
2016	Dave Almarinez (Nacionalista)	Carlo Almoro (Liberal)	Magtangol Jose Carait III (UNA)
2019	Ann Matibag (PDP–Laban)	Magtangol Jose Carait III (Nacionalista)	Abigael Alonte (Nacionalista)
2022	Magtangol Jose Carait III (PDP–Laban/Lakas)	Danzel Rafter Fernandez (Aksyon/NUP)	Wilfredo Bejasa Jr. (PDP–Laban/Lakas)
2025	Bernadeth Olivares (KNP)	Rafael Campos (NUP)	—N/a

=== 2nd District ===
- Cities: Cabuyao, Calamba (until 2025)
- Municipality: Bay, Los Baños

Election year	Member (party)	Member (party)	Member (party)
1998	Sonny Tapia (Lakas-CMD)	Juan Unico (Lakas-CMD)	Luis Tanyag (LAMMP)
2001	Rolly Bagnes (Lakas-CMD)	Sonny Tapia (Lakas-CMD)	Juan Unico (Lakas-CMD)
2004	Ramil Hernandez (Lakas-CMD)	Rolly Bagnes (Lakas-CMD)	Sonny Tapia (Lakas-CMD)
2007	Rolly Bagnes (Lakas-CMD)	Juan Unico (Lakas-CMD)	Neil Andrew Nocon (United Opposition)
2010	Neptali Bagnes (Nacionalista)	Juan Unico (Lakas-Kampi)	Neil Andrew Nocon (Lakas-Kampi)
2013	Neptali Bagnes (UNA)	Pursino Oruga (Liberal)	Juan Unico (UNA)
2016	Ruth Mariano-Hernandez (Nacionalista)	Pursino Oruga (Nacionalista)	Leeanne Aldabe-Cortez (UNA)
2019	Christian Niño Lajara (Nacionalista)	Peewee Perez (PDP-Laban)	Neptali Bagnes (PFP)
2022	Christian Niño Lajara (Aksyon)	Peewee Perez (AKAY)	Tito Fortunato Caringal II (Nacionalista)
2025	Tito Fortunato Caringal II (NUP)	Neptali Bagnes (NUP)	—N/a

=== 3rd District ===
- Cities: San Pablo City
- Municipalities: Alaminos, Calauan, Liliw, Nagcarlan, Rizal, Victoria
- Population (2020): 590,757

Election year	Member (party)	Member (party)
1998	Gerard Christopher Alava (LAMMP)	Ramon De Roma (Lakas–CMD)
2001	Gerard Christopher Alava (KAMPI)	Arcadio Gapangada Jr. (KAMPI)
2004	Arcadio Gapangada Jr. (Lakas-CMD)	Adoracion Alava (LDP)
2007	Katherine Agapay (NPC)	Reynaldo Paras (Lakas-CMD)
2010	Reynaldo Paras (Lakas-Kampi)	Angelica Alarva (Nacionalista)
2013	Katherine Agapay (Independent) (Note: Elevated to Vice Governor on May 30, 2014, following the elevation of Ramil Hernandez to governor.)	Angelica Alarva (UNA)
2016	Dante Amante (UNA)	Alejandro Yu (UNA)
2019	Angelica Alarva (PFP)	Alejandro Yu (PDP-Laban)
2022	Alejandro Yu (PDP-Laban)	Karla Monica Adajar-Lajara (Lakas–CMD)
2025	Karla Monica Adajar-Lajara (Lakas–CMD)	Angelica Alarva (PFP)

=== 4th District ===
- Municipalities: Cavinti, Famy, Kalayaan, Luisiana, Lumban, Mabitac, Magdalena, Majayjay, Paete, Pagsanjan, Pakil, Pangil, Pila, Santa Cruz, Santa Maria, Siniloan

Election year	Member (party)	Member (party)
1992	Felix Flores (LDP)	Benjamin Agarao Jr. (NPC)
1995	Magdaleno Palacol Jr. (LDP)	Querubin Relova Jr. (Lakas-CMD)
1998	Danilo Ramon Fernandez (Lakas-CMD)	Magdaleno Palacol (LAMMP)
2001	Benjamin Agarao Jr. (LDP)	Vincent Soriano (LDP)
2004	Eufemio Lagumbay (Lakas-CMD)	Benedicto Mario Palacol Jr. (Lakas-CMD)
2007	Benedicto Mario Palacol Jr. (Lakas-CMD)	Domingo Panganiban (LDP)
2010	Joseph Kris Benjamin Agarao (Liberal)	Benedicto Mario Palacol Jr. (Lakas-Kampi)
2013	Joseph Kris Benjamin Agarao (Liberal)	Rai-ann Agustine San Luis (Independent)
2016	Joseph Kris Benjamin Agarao (Liberal)	Rai-Ann Agustine San Luis (NUP)
2019	Maria Jamina Katherine Agarao (PDP-Laban)	Rai-Ann Agustine San Luis (Nacionalista)
2022	Joseph Kris Benjamin Agarao (NUP/PFP)	Francis Joseph San Luis (Aksyon)
2025	Maria Jamina Katherine Agarao (PFP)	Rai-Ann Agustine San Luis (NUP)

=== Biñan ===
- Cities: Biñan

Election year	Member (party)	Member (party)
2025	Wilfredo Bejasa Jr. (Lakas–CMD)	Flaviano “Jigcy” D. Pecaña Jr. (Lakas–CMD)

=== Calamba ===
- Cities: Calamba

Election year	Member (party)	Member (party)
2025	Princess Diane Lajara (Lakas–CMD)	Dyan Espiridion (Lakas–CMD)

=== Santa Rosa ===
- Cities: Santa Rosa

Election year	Member (party)	Member (party)
2025	Arnel Gomez (NPC)	Jose Cartaño (NUP)

=== Philippine Councilors League President ===
Election year	Member (party)
1992	Remelito Belen (San Pablo) (LDP)
1995	Remelito Belen (San Pablo) (Lakas NUCD–UMDP)
1998	Edgardo Ramos (Pila) (LAMMP)
2001	Edgardo Ramos (Pila) (KAMPI)
2004	Alejandro Yu (San Pablo) (Lakas–CMD)
2007	Danilo Yang (San Pablo) (PDSP)
2010	Dante Amante (San Pablo) (Lakas–Kampi–CMD)
2013	Jeffrey Place (Rizal) (Liberal)
2016	Jonalina Reyes (Biñan) (Liberal)
2019	Jonalina Reyes (Biñan) (PDP–Laban)
2022	Jonalina Reyes (Biñan) (Lakas–CMD)
2025	Lyca A. Leyma-Luna (Liliw) (NUP) (Interim)
2025	Arvin Manguiat (Calamba) (Lakas–CMD)

=== Liga ng mga Barangay President ===
Election year	Member (party)
1989	Felix Ravelas (Pila) (Nonpartisan)
2002	Numeriano Buenviaje (San Pedro) (Nonpartisan)
2007	Bernabe Vibora (Victoria) (Nonpartisan)
2010	Floro Esguerra (Cavinti) (Nonpartisan)
2013	Lorenzo Zuñiga Jr. (Alaminos) (Nonpartisan)
2018	Ma. Meg A. Espiritu (Santa Cruz) (Nonpartisan)
2024	Lorenzo Zuñiga Jr. (Alaminos) (PFP)

=== SK Provincial Federation President ===
Election year	Member (party)
2007	Kathleen Kay Kampitan Yambot (Victoria) (Nonpartisan)
2010	Von Mark Anthony R. Dacdac (Pagsanjan) (Nonpartisan)
2018	Autriou Austeen Amante (San Pablo) (Nonpartisan)
2023	Bhenj Stephen Felismino (San Pablo) (Nonpartisan)
