= 2007 Laguna local elections =

Part of 2007 Philippine general elections

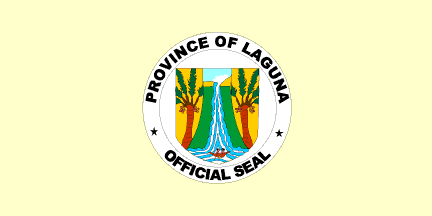
- May 14, 2007
- Gubernatorial election
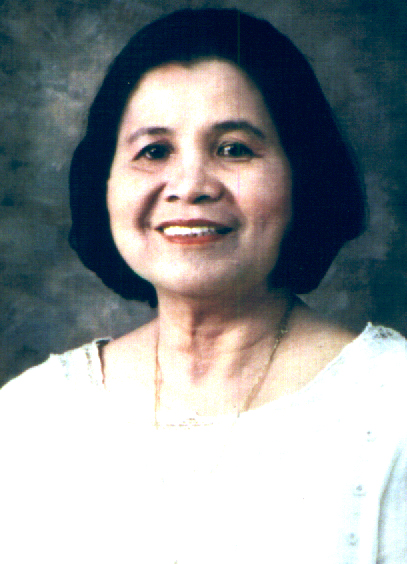

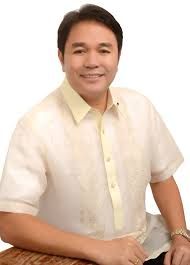
Nominee	Teresita Lazaro	Edwin Olivarez
Party	Lakas–Kampi	UNO
Running mate	Marco Sison	Ramil Hernandez
Popular vote	425,732	390,891
Percentage	52.13	47.87
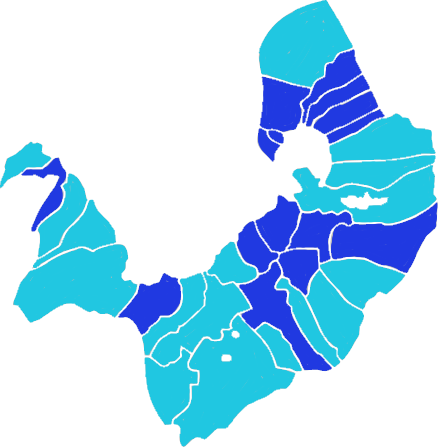
- Result of the Gubernatorial election by Cities/Municipalities
Governor before election
Teresita Lazaro
Lakas
Elected Governor
Teresita Lazaro
Lakas–Kampi
- Vice gubernatorial election
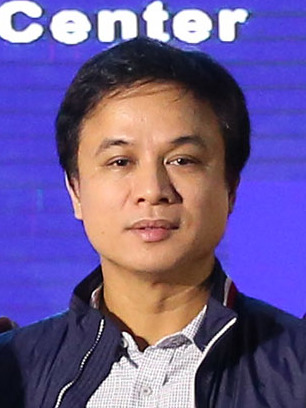

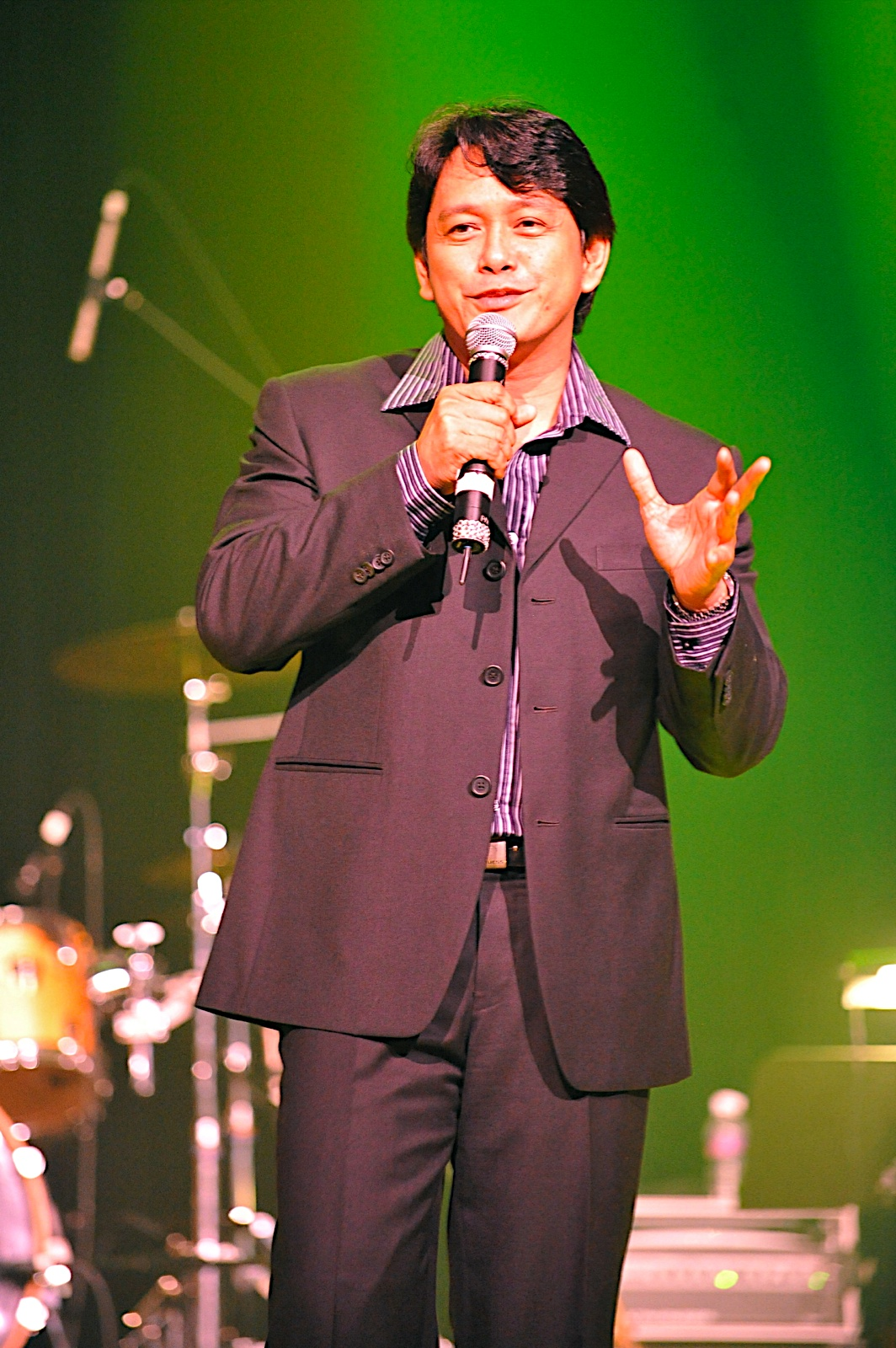
Candidate	Ramil Hernandez	Marco Sison
Party	UNO	Lakas
Popular vote	418,166	289,249
Percentage	59.11	40.89
Vice Governor before election
Edwin Olivarez
Lakas
Elected Vice Governor
Ramil Hernandez
UNO

Local elections were held in the Province of Laguna on May 14, 2007 as part of the 2007 Philippine general election. Voters selected candidates for all local positions: a municipal/city mayor, vice mayor and town councilors, as well as members of the Sangguniang Panlalawigan, the vice-governor, governor and representatives for the four districts of Laguna.

== Candidates ==
=== Administration coalition ===
Team Lazaro–Sison
Name	Party	Result
For Governor
Teresita Lazaro	Lakas	Won
For Vice Governor
Marco Sison	Lakas	Lost
For 1st District
For Representative
Nereo Raymundo Joaquin Jr.	Lakas	Lost
For Board Member
Dave Almarinez	Lakas	Won
Ramon Carrillo	Lakas	Won
Macrino Jesus Tancinco	Lakas	Lost
2nd District
For Representative
Susano Tapia	Independent	Lost
For Board Member
Ronaldo Bagnes	Lakas	Won
Juan Unico	Lakas	Won
Alvin Villa	Lakas	Lost
3rd District
For Representative
Florante Aquino	Lakas	Lost
For Board Member
Mirabo Bueser	Lakas	Lost
Reynaldo Paras	Lakas	Won
4th District
For Representative
Eufemio Lagumbay	Lakas	Lost
For Board Member
Jeffrie Beldemor	Lakas	Lost
Benedicto Mario Palacol Jr.	Lakas	Won

=== Opposition coalition ===
Team Olivarez–Hernandez
Name	Party	Result
For Governor
Edwin Olivarez	UNO	Lost
For Vice Governor
Ramil Hernandez	UNO	Won
1st District
For Representative
Danilo Fernandez	UNO	Won
For Board Member
Godofredo Garcia	UNO	Lost
Jaime Salandanan	UNO	Lost
Emilio Tiongco	UNO	Won
2nd District
For Representative
Justine Marc Chipeco	Nacionalista	Won
For Board Member
Niel Andrew Nocon	UNO	Won
Philip Rodriguez	UNO	Lost
Victor Silman	UNO	Lost
3rd District
For Representative
Najie Gapangada	NPC	Lost
For Board Member
Katherine Agapay	NPC	Won
Angelica Jones–Alarva	KAMPI	Lost
4th District
For Representative
Benjamin Agarao Jr.	Liberal	Lost
For Board Member
Elmoise Afurong	LDP	Lost
Domingo Panganiban	LDP	Won

== Provincial elections ==
=== Gubernatorial election ===
Incumbent Teresita Lazaro is running for her third and final term. Her main opponent is Vice Governor Edwin Olivarez.

Laguna Gubernatorial election
Party	Candidate	Votes	%
Lakas–Kampi	Teresita Lazaro (Incumbent)	425,732	52.13
UNO	Edwin Olivarez	390,891	47.87
Total votes		816,623	100.00
Lakas–Kampi hold			

=== Vice gubernatorial election ===
Incumbent Edwin Olivarez is not running for reelection. Instead, he is running for Governor. His party nominee is 2nd district board member Ramil Hernandez. Hernandez's main opponent is singer and 1st district board member Marco Sison.

Laguna Vice gubernatorial election
Party	Candidate	Votes	%
UNO	Ramil Hernandez	418,166	59.11
Lakas–Kampi	Marco Sison	289,249	40.89
Total votes		707,415	100.00
UNO gain from Lakas–Kampi			

=== Provincial Board ===
All 4 Districts of Laguna elected Sangguniang Panlalawigan or Provincial Board members.

==== Summary ====
Party	Votes	%	Seats
Lakas–Kampi	696,157	44.00	5
UNO	404,254	25.55	2
LDP	137,182	8.67	1
Liberal	111,582	7.05	0
NPC	99,694	6.30	1
KAMPI	76,795	4.85	0
PDSP	43,379	2.74	0
Independent	13,281	0.84	0
Ex officio seats			3
Total	1,582,324	100.00	12

==== 1st District ====
- Cities: Santa Rosa
- Municipality: Biñan, San Pedro

2007 Laguna Provincial Board election in 1st District
Party	Candidate	Votes	%
Lakas–Kampi	Dave Almarinez	101,301	19.65
UNO	Emilio Tiongco	93,051	18.05
Lakas–Kampi	Ramon Carrillo (Incumbent)	84,246	16.35
UNO	Godofredo Garcia	80,075	15.54
UNO	Jaime Salandanan	65,621	12.73
Liberal	Medardo Recto	46,077	8.94
Lakas–Kampi	Macrino Jesus Tancinco	35,589	6.91
Independent	Jose Bercelona	9,438	1.83
Total votes		515,398	100.00

==== 2nd District ====
- Cities: Calamba
- Municipality: Bay, Cabuyao, Los Baños

2007 Laguna Provincial Board election in 2nd District
Party	Candidate	Votes	%
Lakas–Kampi	Ronaldo Bagnes (Incumbent)	117,738	24.70
Lakas–Kampi	Juan Unico	73,060	15.33
UNO	Neil Andrew Nocon	68,559	14.38
Lakas–Kampi	Alvin Villa	67,455	14.15
UNO	Philip Rodriguez	60,153	12.62
UNO	Victor Siman	36,795	7.72
KAMPI	Juanito Fajardo	34,260	7.19
Liberal	Albert Tenorio	18,667	3.92
Total votes		476,687	100.00

==== 3rd District ====
- Cities: San Pablo
- Municipality: Alaminos, Calauan, Liliw, Nagcarlan, Rizal, Victoria

2007 Laguna Provincial Board election in 3rd District
Party	Candidate	Votes	%
NPC	Katherine Agapay	99,694	36.20
Lakas–Kampi	Reynaldo Paras	44,263	16.07
Lakas–Kampi	Mirabo Bueser	44,173	16.04
PDSP	Michael Potenciano	43,379	15.75
KAMPI	Angelica Jones–Alarva	42,535	15.44
Independent	Ernesto Javier	1,359	0.49
Total votes		275,403	100.00

==== 4th District ====
- Municipalities: Cavinti, Famy, Kalayaan, Luisiana, Lumban, Mabitac, Magdalena, Majayjay, Paete, Pagsanjan, Pakil, Pangil, Pila, Santa Cruz, Santa Maria, Siniloan

2007 Laguna Provincial Board election in 4th District
Party	Candidate	Votes	%
Lakas–Kampi	Benedicto Mario Palacol Jr. (Incumbent)	79,182	25.15
LDP	Domingo Panganiban	72,859	23.14
LDP	Elmoise Afurong	64,323	20.43
Lakas–Kampi	Jeffrie Beldemor	49,150	15.61
Liberal	Ferdinand Ragaza	46,838	14.88
Independent	Louie Caballes	2,484	0.79
Total votes		314,834	100.00

== Congressional elections ==
Each of Laguna's four legislative districts elected a representative to the House of Representatives. The candidate with the highest number of votes wins the seat.

=== 1st District ===
Incumbent Uliran Tee–Joaquin is term-limited and she is running for Mayor of San Pedro. Her party did not name a candidate for representative but her son Nereo Raymundo Jr. is running but later lost to Dan Fernandez.

2007 Philippine House of Representatives election in Laguna's 1st District
Party	Candidate	Votes	%
UNO	Danilo Fernandez	95,927	43.74
Lakas–Kampi	Nereo Raymundo Joaquin Jr.	61,891	28.22
Independent	Felicisimo Vierneza	46,541	21.23
PMP	Gabnulang Alatiit	14,519	6.62
Liberal	Libreto Patromo	426	0.19
Total votes		219,304	100.00
UNO gain from NPC			

=== 2nd District ===
Incumbent Justine Marc Chipeco is running for reelection. His main opponent is incumbent Provincial Board Member Susano Tapia.

2007 Philippine House of Representatives election in Laguna's 2nd District
Party	Candidate	Votes	%
Nacionalista	Justin Marc Chipeco (Incumbent)	175,310	84.93
Independent	Susano Tapia	31,095	15.07
Total votes		206,405	100.00
Nacionalista hold			

=== 3rd District ===
Incumbent Danton Bueser is term limited and running Mayor of San Pablo City. His party nominee is San Pablo City Councilor Ma. Evita Arago.

2007 Philippine House of Representatives election in Laguna's 3rd District
Party	Candidate	Votes	%
Liberal	Maria Evita Arago	60,449	35.87
NPC	Arcadio Gapangada Jr.	44,871	26.63
Lakas–Kampi	Florante Aquino	38,620	22.92
KAMPI	Adoracion Alava	12,808	7.60
KAMPI	Enrico Velasco	5,733	3.40
Independent	Damaso Amante	5,315	3.15
Independent	Andrew Atienza	732	0.43
Total votes		168,526	100.00
Liberal hold			

=== 4th District ===
Incumbent Benjamin Agarao Jr. is running for reelection. His main opponent is Edgar San Luis.

2007 Philippine House of Representatives election in Laguna's 4th District
Party	Candidate	Votes	%
Independent	Edgar San Luis	96,038	48.33
Liberal	Benjamin Agarao Jr. (Incumbent)	86,322	43.78
Lakas–Kampi	Eufemio Lagumbay	15,824	7.89
Total votes		197,184	100.00
Independent gain from Liberal			

== City and municipal elections ==
All municipalities of Laguna. Calamba City, San Pablo City, and Santa Rosa City will also elect mayor and vice-mayor this election. The candidates for mayor and vice mayor with the highest number of votes wins the seat; they are voted separately, therefore, they may be of different parties when elected. Below is the list of mayoralty and vice mayoralty candidates of each cities and municipalities per district.

=== 1st District ===
- Cities: Santa Rosa
- Municipality: Biñan, San Pedro

==== Santa Rosa ====
Santa Rosa mayoralty election
Party	Candidate	Votes	%
Lakas–Kampi	Arlene Arcillas–Nazareno	35,876	40.56
KAMPI	Jose Catindig Jr.	32,705	36.98
UNO	Roberto Gonzales	19,860	22.46
Total votes		88,441	100.00
Lakas–Kampi gain from Independent			

Santa Rosa vice mayoralty election
Party	Candidate	Votes	%
NPC	Manuel Alipon	30,599	36.04
KAMPI	Laudemer Carta	19,154	22.56
UNO	Eric Puzon	18,356	21.62
Lakas–Kampi	Petronio Factoriza	16,797	19.78
Total votes		84,906	100.00
NPC gain from Lakas			

==== Biñan ====
Vice Mayor Len Alonte won the elections against former Vice Mayor and 2004 mayoral candidate Jose Francisco Ruben Yatco.

Biñan mayoralty election
Party	Candidate	Votes	%
UNO	Marlyn Alonte	36,323	50.98
Lakas–Kampi	Jose Francisco Ruben Yatco	29,233	41.03
KAMPI	Alexis Desuasido	5,525	7.76
Aksyon	Hermista Deocaris	163	0.23
Total votes		71,244	100.00
UNO gain from Lakas			

Councilor Walfredo Dimaguila Jr. won the elections.

Biñan vice mayoralty election
Party	Candidate	Votes	%
UNO	Walfredo Dimaguila Jr.	37,700	55.50
Lakas–Kampi	Emmanuel Lao	27,802	40.93
KAMPI	Carlos Merdiola	2,420	3.56
Total votes		67,922	100.00
UNO hold			

==== San Pedro ====
San Pedro mayoralty election
Party	Candidate	Votes	%
UNO	Calixto Cataquiz	42,276	53.12
NPC	Uliran Tee–Joaquin	37,303	46.88
Total votes		79,579	100.00
UNO gain from Lakas			

San Pedro vice mayoralty election
Party	Candidate	Votes	%
NPC	Celso Ambayec	32,657	42.01
UNO	Wesley Redimano	23,746	30.54
LDP	Delio Hatulan	21,341	27.45
Total votes		77,744	100.00
NPC gain from Lakas			

=== 2nd District ===
- Cities: Calamba
- Municipality: Bay, Cabuyao, Los Baños

==== Calamba ====
Calamba mayoralty election
Party	Candidate	Votes	%
KAMPI	Joaquin Chipeco Jr. (Incumbent)	72,147	59.39
UNO	Moises Morales	49,329	40.61
Total votes		121,476	100.00
KAMPI hold			

Calamba vice mayoralty election
Party	Candidate	Votes	%
KAMPI	Pursino Oruga (Incumbent)	62,554	56.01
PDP–Laban	Edgardo Catindig	41,893	37.51
Liberal	Rolando Baliao	7,240	6.48
Total votes		111,687	100.00
KAMPI hold			

==== Bay ====
Bay mayoralty election
Party	Candidate	Votes	%
KAMPI	Bruno Ramos (Incumbent)	17,769	85.13
UNO	Pablito Duron	3,104	14.87
Total votes		20,873	100.00
KAMPI hold			

Bay vice mayoralty election
Party	Candidate	Votes	%
KAMPI	Ceasar Comia (Incumbent)	13,353	65.13
Independent	Edwin Ramos	7,150	34.87
Total votes		20,503	100.00
KAMPI hold			

==== Cabuyao ====
Cabuyao mayoralty election
Party	Candidate	Votes	%
KAMPI	Isidro Hemedes Jr.	26,245	42.71
Lakas–Kampi	Proceso Aguillo	19,458	31.67
UNO	Edgardo Alimagino	12,071	19.65
Independent	Jesus Alimagino	3,669	5.97
Total votes		61,443	100.00
KAMPI gain from Lakas			

Cabuyao vice mayoralty election
Party	Candidate	Votes	%
Lakas–Kampi	Benjamin Del Rosario	22,415	37.71
UNO	Leif Opiña	19,225	32.35
Independent	Severiano Hain	12,585	21.17
KAMPI	Leonardo Alviar	5,210	8.77
Total votes		59,435	100.00
Lakas–Kampi gain from KAMPI			

==== Los Baños ====
Los Baños mayoralty election
Party	Candidate	Votes	%
Lakas–Kampi	Ceasar Perez (Incumbent)	24,883	72.17
PMP	Norvin Tamisin	8,235	23.89
UNO	Juan Leron	1,358	3.94
Total votes		34,476	100.00
Lakas–Kampi hold			

Los Baños vice mayoralty election
Party	Candidate	Votes	%
Lakas–Kampi	Procopio Alipon (Incumbent)	18,791	57.21
Independent	Geronimo Ciceron	13,251	40.34
UNO	Eduardo Suplac	804	2.45
Total votes		32,846	100.00
Lakas–Kampi hold			

=== 3rd District ===
- Cities: San Pablo
- Municipality: Alaminos, Calauan, Liliw, Nagcarlan, Rizal, Victoria

==== San Pablo ====
San Pablo mayoralty election
Party	Candidate	Votes	%
NPC	Vicente Amante (Incumbent)	59,228	64.91
Liberal	Danton Bueser	31,254	34.25
Independent	Alfredo Cosico	766	0.84
Total votes		91,248	100.00
NPC hold			

San Pablo vice mayoralty election
Party	Candidate	Votes	%
Lakas–Kampi	Frederick Martin Ilagan	34,666	41.84
NPC	Lauro Vidal (Incumbent)	25,475	30.75
KAMPI	Raimund Agapito	13,078	15.78
PMP	Edgardo Adajar	9,471	11.43
Independent	Jell Ilagan	166	0.20
Total votes		82,856	100.00
Lakas–Kampi gain from NPC			

==== Alaminos ====
Alaminos mayoralty election
Party	Candidate	Votes	%
UNO	Eladio Magampon	6,230	36.89
Lakas–Kampi	Samuel Bueser (Incumbent)	5,516	32.66
KAMPI	Lorenzo Zuñiga Jr.	5,144	30.46
Total votes		16,890	100.00
UNO gain from Lakas–Kampi			

Alaminos vice mayoralty election
Party	Candidate	Votes	%
UNO	Ruben Alvarez (Incumbent)	8,809	52.93
Lakas–Kampi	Wilson Villanueva	5,303	31.87
KAMPI	Lorelei Pampolina	2,530	15.20
Total votes		16,642	100.00
UNO hold			

==== Calauan ====
Calauan mayoralty election
Party	Candidate	Votes	%
Lakas–Kampi	Buenafrido Berris (Incumbent)	10,770	59.42
NPC	Allan Jun Sanchez	7,354	40.58
Total votes		18,124	100.00
Lakas–Kampi hold			

Calauan vice mayoralty election
Party	Candidate	Votes	%
NPC	June Joseph Brion (Incumbent)	7,209	40.69
Lakas–Kampi	Jaime Goyena Jr.	5,574	31.46
Liberal	Germenegildo Ilagan	4,932	27.84
Total votes		17,715	100.00
NPC hold			

==== Liliw ====
Liliw mayoralty election
Party	Candidate	Votes	%
Lakas–Kampi	Ceasar Sulibit (Incumbent)	8,104	53.64
UNO	Jonathan Polistico	7,003	46.36
Total votes		15,107	100.00
Lakas–Kampi hold			

Liliw vice mayoralty election
Party	Candidate	Votes	%
Lakas–Kampi	Raymundo Pales (Incumbent)	8,235	57.48
UNO	Dennis Kabamalan	6,092	42.52
Total votes		14,327	100.00
Lakas–Kampi hold			

==== Nagcarlan ====
Nagcarlan mayoralty election
Party	Candidate	Votes	%
UNO	Alejandro Malabag	7,667	40.20
NPC	Eliseo Corcega	7,246	37.99
Lakas–Kampi	Antonino Tobias III	2,899	15.20
KAMPI	Ma. Charmaine Manzano	1,235	6.47
Independent	Juanito Sumariba	27	0.14
Total votes		19,074	100.00
UNO gain from Lakas–Kampi			

Nagcarlan vice mayoralty election
Party	Candidate	Votes	%
NPC	Nelson Osuna (Incumbent)	10,390	50.10
UNO	Vicente Arranila	9,019	43.49
Lakas–Kampi	Teddy Coroza	1,141	5.50
KAMPI	Zosimo Llaren	187	0.90
Total votes		20,737	100.00
NPC hold			

==== Rizal ====
Rizal mayoralty election
Party	Candidate	Votes	%
Aksyon	Rolen Urriquia (Incumbent)	4,279	57.08
Lakas–Kampi	Martin Ortega	3,217	42.92
Total votes		7,496	100.00

Rizal vice mayoralty election
Party	Candidate	Votes	%
Lakas–Kampi	Antonino Aurelio	4,734	62.64
Aksyon	Josefina Endozo	2,823	37.36
Total votes		7,557	100.00

==== Victoria ====
Victoria mayoralty election
Party	Candidate	Votes	%
Lakas–Kampi	Dwight Kampitan (Incumbent)	7,068	45.84
KAMPI	Renato Rebong	5,098	33.06
UNO	Restituto Cacha	3,254	21.10
Total votes		15,420	100.00
Lakas–Kampi hold			

Victoria vice mayoralty election
Party	Candidate	Votes	%
UNO	Florencio Laraño	7,113	46.67
Independent	Prudencio Pahutan	4,863	31.91
Lakas–Kampi	Cecilia Evio	3,264	21.42
Total votes		15,240	100.00
UNO gain from PDSP			

=== 4th District ===
- Municipalities: Cavinti, Famy, Kalayaan, Luisiana, Lumban, Mabitac, Magdalena, Majayjay, Paete, Pagsanjan, Pakil, Pangil, Pila, Santa Cruz, Santa Maria, Siniloan

==== Cavinti ====
Cavinti mayoralty election
Party	Candidate	Votes	%
Lakas–Kampi	Florcelie Esguerra	4,358	39.99
Liberal	Oscar Gordula	3,299	30.27
UNO	Manolo Villanueva	3,242	29.75
Total votes		10,899	100.00
Lakas–Kampi hold			

Cavinti vice maoralty election
Party	Candidate	Votes	%
Lakas–Kampi	Wilmer Blastique	4,068	42.24
Liberal	Roland Mesina	2,960	30.73
UNO	Eliseo Toque	2,603	27.03
Total votes		9,631	100.00
Lakas–Kampi gain from UNO			

==== Famy ====
Famy mayoralty election
Party	Candidate	Votes	%
LDP	Emmanuel Acomular	2,334	34.82
Lakas–Kampi	Jose De Leon	1,523	22.72
Liberal	Vicente Carlos Llamas IV	1,476	22.02
KAMPI	Restituto Fernandez Jr.	1,370	20.44
Total votes		6,703	100.00
LDP gain from Lakas			

Famy vice mayoralty election
Party	Candidate	Votes	%
Lakas–Kampi	Melvin Laminero	3,076	47.34
LDP	Constancio Fernandez	2,377	36.58
KAMPI	Francisco Valverde	1,045	16.08
Total votes		6,498	100.00
Lakas–Kampi hold			

==== Kalayaan ====
Kalayaan mayoralty election
Party	Candidate	Votes	%
KAMPI	Teodoro Adao Jr.	3,615	40.76
Lakas–Kampi	Antonio Dela Paz	2,935	33.09
Liberal	Celestino Magbojos Jr.	2,320	26.16
Total votes		8,870	100.00

Kalayaan vice mayoralty election
Party	Candidate	Votes	%
Lakas–Kampi	Russel Laganas	4,383	50.43
KAMPI	Christopher Ramiro	4,308	49.57
Total votes		8,691	100.00

==== Luisiana ====
Incumbent Mayor Manuel Rondila is running for re-election. His main opponent is Councilor Nestor Rondilla.

Luisiana mayoralty election
Party	Candidate	Votes	%
Lakas–Kampi	Manuel Rondilla (Incumbent)	4,824	52.41
Liberal	Nestor Rondilla	4,380	47.59
Total votes		9,204	100.00

Incumbent Vice Mayor Alex Noceja is running for re-election. His main opponents are Crisanto Villamin and Councilor Eduardo Aldovino.

Luisiana vice mayoralty election
Party	Candidate	Votes	%
Lakas–Kampi	Crisanto Villamin	3,421	37.42
Liberal	Eduardo Aldovino	3,039	33.25
Independent	Alex Noceja (Incumbent)	2,681	29.33
Total votes		9,141	100.00

==== Lumban ====
Lumban mayoralty election
Party	Candidate	Votes	%
Liberal	Wilfredo Paraiso (Incumbent)	7,977	57.92
Lakas–Kampi	Virgilio Lizo	5,795	42.08
Total votes		13,772	100.00

Lumban vice mayoralty election
Party	Candidate	Votes	%
Lakas–Kampi	Zaldy Raga	8,294	62.9
Liberal	Mario Ablao (Incumbent)	4,893	37.1
Total votes		13,187	100.00

==== Mabitac ====
Mabitac mayoralty election
Party	Candidate	Votes	%
Lakas–Kampi	Gerardo Fader (Incumbent)	4,660	
LDP	Apollo Aguilar	3,648	
Total votes			

Mabitac vice mayoralty election
Party	Candidate	Votes	%
LDP	Jacquieline Carpio	4,577	
Lakas–Kampi	Conrado Capuno	3,489	
Total votes			

==== Magdalena ====
Magdalena mayoralty election
Party	Candidate	Votes	%
LDP	David Aventurado Jr.	3,484	
Lakas–Kampi	Teresa Nieva Reodica (Incumbent)	3,140	
Liberal	Leovino Porcioncula	2,751	
Total votes			

Magdalena vice mayoralty election
Party	Candidate	Votes	%
Lakas–Kampi	Virgilio Sol (Incumbent)	3,707	
Liberal	Romulo Obmerga	2,747	
LDP	Maximo Sotomayor	2,584	
Total votes			

==== Majayjay ====
Majayjay mayoralty election
Party	Candidate	Votes	%
Lakas–Kampi	Victorino Rodillas (Incumbent)	6,517	56.26
LDP	Teofilo Guera	5,067	43.74
Total votes		11,584	100.00

Majayjay vice mayoralty election
Party	Candidate	Votes	%
LDP	Avelino Merestela	5,322	47.61
Lakas–Kampi	Wilson Amorado	5,020	44.91
Independent	Teodoro Pontiveros	837	7.49
Total votes		11,179	100.00

==== Paete ====
Paete mayoralty election
Party	Candidate	Votes	%
Lakas–Kampi	Emmanuel Cadayon (Incumbent)	4,512	
Lakas–Kampi	Florentino Velasco	4,340	
Liberal	Elizabeth Calma	1,536	
Independent	Charlie Baldemor	181	
Total votes			

Paete vice mayoralty election
Party	Candidate	Votes	%
Lakas–Kampi	Rojilyn Bagabaldo (Incumbent)	5,131	
Lakas–Kampi	Manuel Agbada Jr.	3,922	
Liberal	Danilo Bailo	1,287	
Total votes			

==== Pagsanjan ====
Pagsanjan mayoralty election
Party	Candidate	Votes	%
PMP	Emilio Ramon Ejercito III (Incumbent)	9,909	
Independent	Ruben Abella	5,484	
Independent	Abner Afuang	297	
Total votes			

Pagsanjan vice mayoralty election
Party	Candidate	Votes	%
PMP	Crisostomo Vilar (Incumbent)	7,251	
Independent	Augusto Kamatoy	5,834	
Independent	Noel Cabela	1,813	
Total votes			

==== Pakil ====
Pakil mayoralty election
Party	Candidate	Votes	%
Lakas–Kampi	Vipops Charles Martinez	2,339	
Liberal	Alfredo Manay Jr.	2,220	
LDP	Ariel Fornoles	2,075	
Independent	Fernando Cabeñero	1,915	
Total votes			

Pakil mayoralty election
Party	Candidate	Votes	%
Liberal	Renato Cadsawan	2,866	
LDP	Jaime Soriano	2,753	
Independent	Hernan Sarmiento	1,758	
Lakas–Kampi	Luis Regalado	628	
Total votes			

==== Pangil ====
Pangil mayoralty election
Party	Candidate	Votes	%
Lakas–Kampi	Juanita Manzana (Incumbent)	5,867	
Independent	Jovito Reyes	3,141	
Total votes			

Pangil vice mayoralty election
Party	Candidate	Votes	%
Lakas–Kampi	Raymund Diaz (Incumbent)	3,486	
Liberal	Lucila Leonardo Jbeili	2,849	
Independent	Marlon Acaylar	2,534	
Total votes			

==== Pila ====
Pila mayoralty election
Party	Candidate	Votes	%
KAMPI	Wilfredo Quiat (Incumbent)	10,103	
Lakas–Kampi	Rosauro Framil	7,827	
Total votes			

Pila vice mayoralty election
Party	Candidate	Votes	%
Liberal	Edgardo Ramos	5,678	
Independent	Querubin Anyonio Relova	4,477	
Independent	Zoilo Dawinan	4,101	
KAMPI	Milagros Carrillio (Incumbent)	3,590	
Total votes			

==== Santa Cruz ====
Santa Cruz mayoralty election
Party	Candidate	Votes	%
Liberal	Ariel Magcalas	22,283	56.84
LDP	Rodolfo San Luis	16,917	43.16
Total votes		39,200	100.00
Liberal gain from LDP			

Santa Cruz vice mayoralty election
Party	Candidate	Votes	%
Liberal	Alan Pamatmat	14,810	40.25
LDP	Bryan Lateo	14,335	38.96
Independent	Jaime Alexander Calupitan	7,650	20.79
Total votes		36,795	100.00
Liberal hold			

==== Santa Maria ====
Santa Maria mayoralty election
Party	Candidate	Votes	%
Lakas–Kampi	Josie Cuento	8,301	67.61
Independent	Norlito Briones	3,976	32.39
Total votes		12,277	100.00

Santa Maria vice mayoralty election
Party	Candidate	Votes	%
Lakas–Kampi	Mario Palicpic	6,465	53.6
Liberal	Ma. Fritzie Pagsuyuin–Aguado	5,596	46.4
Total votes		12,061	100.00

==== Siniloan ====
Siniloan mayoralty election
Party	Candidate	Votes	%
Lakas–Kampi	Guillermo Acero (Incumbent)	9,593	65.09
Independent	Roberto Acoba	5,145	34.91
Total votes		14,738	100.00

Siniloan vice mayoralty election
Party	Candidate	Votes	%
Independent	Paul Simon Go	8,538	57.91
Lakas–Kampi	Edgardo Malay	6,205	42.09
Total votes		14,743	100.00
