= 2016 Laguna local elections =

Philippine election

2016 Laguna gubernatorial election
- May 9, 2016
- Gubernatorial election
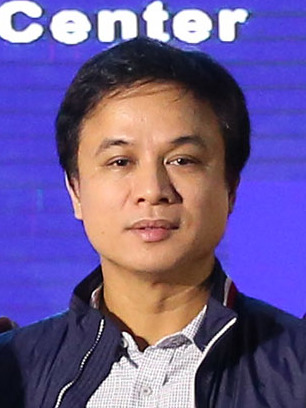

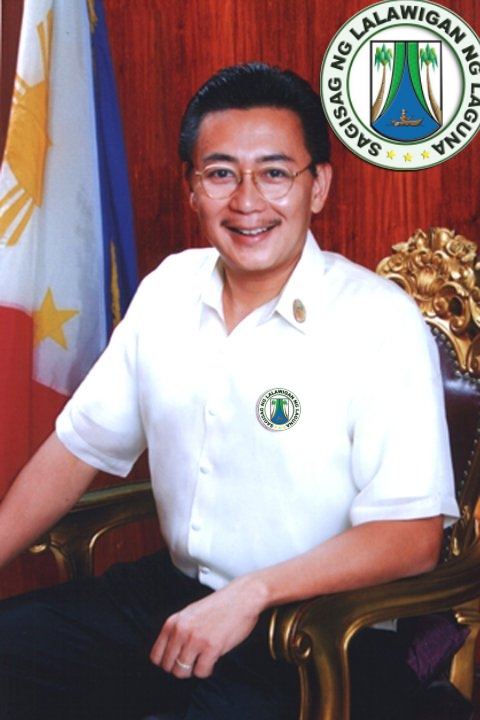
Nominee	Ramil Hernandez	Jorge Antonio "Jerico" Ejercito (withdrew)	ER Ejercito
Party	Nacionalista	PGP	UNA
Running mate	Katherine Agapay	Angelica Jones Alarva	Christian Lajara
Popular vote	607,347	337,627	233,901
Percentage	51.12	28.42	19.69
- Vice gubernatorial election
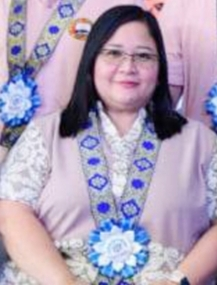

Nominee	Katherine Agapay	Christian Niño Lajara	Angelica Jones–Alarva
Party	Nacionalista	UNA	Liberal
Popular vote	482,481	340,906	208,866
Percentage	45.56	32.19	19.72
Governor before election
Ramil Hernandez
Nacionalista
Elected Governor
Ramil Hernandez
Nacionalista

Local elections were held in Laguna on May 9, 2016, as part of the 2016 general election. Voters will select candidates for all local positions: a town mayor, vice mayor and town councilors, as well as members of the Sangguniang Panlalawigan, the vice-governor, governor and representatives for the four districts of Laguna, including the newly created Biñan lone district.

Incumbent Governor Ramil Hernandez is running for his first full three-year term as governor. Hernandez assumed the governorship in 2014 after the Commission on Elections disqualifies ER Ejercito for campaign overspending in the 2013 elections. Ejercito is seeking to regain his post.

Hernandez's running mate is Vice Governor Katherine Agapay while Niño Lajara is Ejercito's running mate.

== Background ==
Incumbent governor Ramil Hernandez, who was the vice governor at that time, assumed office on May 27, 2014. This after the Commission on Elections disqualified incumbent Governor ER Ejercito, also known as Jorge Estregan, due to campaign overspending during the 2013 elections. When Ejercito was about to step down upon the advice of his uncle, former Philippine President and incumbent Mayor of Manila Joseph Estrada, he declared a statement:

I Governor Jorge "ER" Ejecito Estregan, will be your governor, now and forever. Wait for the return of the eagle.

This clearly states his intention to run in 2016. Ejercito is running under the United Nationalist Alliance to reclaim the governorship of the province. His running mate is Christian Niño Lajara, son of former Calamba Mayor Severino Lajara.

Under the Nacionalista Party, Hernandez will run for his first full three-year term as governor of the province, with Vice Governor Katherine Agapay as his running mate. Agapay, being the senior board member, assumed as vice governor upon the assumption of Hernandez as governor.

=== Agarao's Party ===
On October 2, 2015, on the LP Provincial convention in Santa Cruz, Laguna, and birthday party of Representative Benjie Agarao, which attended by presidential candidate Mar Roxas and senatorial candidate Francis Tolentino, which become controversial that Tolentino sent girl group Play Girls for a dance show, which was criticized by netizens due to obscene performance.

=== Coalition dispute ===
Hernandez, a member of the Nacionalista Party decided to coalesce with the Liberal Party, supporting Mar Roxas for the president. However, they will support, Alan Peter Cayetano, Bongbong Marcos or Antonio Trillanes IV as their Vice President—but all they're failed to get that party's nomination and instead running independents; Cayetano and Marcos are running mates for respective presidential candidates, Rodrigo Duterte of PDP–Laban and Miriam Defensor-Santiago of People's Reform Party, while Trillanes is supporting Grace Poe's presidential bid. However, Hernandez chose to support Roxas' running mate for vice president, Camarines Sur's Third District representative Leni Robredo. Despite the coalition, NP picked Incumbent Katherine Agapay as their candidate for vice governor while 3rd District Board Member Angelica Jones is LP's candidate for vice governor. Former 4th District Congressman Edgar San Luis, who ran for governor in 2013 but lost to Ejercito and decided not to run to give way for Hernandez, bolted the Liberal Party and moved to National Unity Party (even the NUP was already in coalesce with the Liberal coalition, known as "Koalisyon ng Daang Matuwid").

=== Candidates ===
Nacionalista Party
Name	Party	Result
For Governor
Ramil Hernandez	Nacionalista	Won
For Vice Governor
Atty. Karen Agapay	Nacionalista	Won
1st District
For Board Member
Gab Alatiit	Nacionalista	Lost
Dave Almarinez	Nacionalista	Won
Leslie Lu	Nacionalista	Lost
For Board Member
Neptali Bagnes	Nacionalista	Lost
Ruth Hernandez	Nacionalista	Won
Pursino Oruga	Nacionalista	Won

Liberal Party (Philippines)
Name	Party	Result
For Vice Governor
Angelica Jones	Liberal	Lost
1st District
For House Of Representative
Arlene Arcillas	Liberal	Won
For Board Member
Carlo Almoro	Liberal	Won
Mariellie Micor	Liberal	Lost
2nd District
For House Of Representative
Jun Chipeco	Liberal	Won
3rd District
For Board Member
Robinson Abital	Liberal	Lost
Geriz Bigol	Liberal	Lost
Azenith Briones	Liberal	Lost
Marvin Gerald Tunay	Liberal	Lost
4th District
For House Of Representative
Benjie Agarao	Liberal	Won
For Board Member
Benjo Agarao	Liberal	Won

United Nationalist Alliance
Name	Party	Result
For Governor
E.R Ejercito	UNA	Lost
For Vice Governor
Christian "Niño" Lajara	UNA	Lost
1st District
For Board Member
JM Carait	UNA	Won
Gherome Ejercito	UNA	Lost
2nd District
For Board Member
Lian Aldabe	UNA	Won
June Ebron	UNA	Lost
3rd District
For Board Member
Sol Aragones	UNA	Won
For Board Member
Dante Amante	UNA	Won
Abi Yu	UNA	Won
4th District
For House Of Representative
Fidel Santos	UNA	Lost
For Board Member
Gerald Ejercito	UNA	Lost

== Provincial elections ==
=== Governor ===
Laguna gubernatorial election
Party	Candidate	Votes	%
Nacionalista	Ramil Hernandez	607,347	51.12%
PGP	Jorge Antonio "Jerico" G. Ejercito	337,627	28.42%
UNA	Emilio Ramon "E.R." Ejercito	233,901	19.69%
PBM	Berlene Alberto	6,081	0.51
Independent	Nemesio Sucano	3,111	0.26
Total votes		1,188,067	100%
Nacionalista hold			

=== Vice governor ===
Laguna vice gubernatorial election
Party	Candidate	Votes	%
Nacionalista	Katherine Agapay	482,481	45.56%
UNA	Christian Nino Lajara	340,906	32.19%
Liberal	Angelica Jones Alarva	208,866	19.72%
Independent	Mateo San Sebastian	26,701	2.52%
Total votes		1,058,954	100%
Nacionalista hold			

=== Congressional elections ===
==== 1st District ====
Incumbent Danilo Fernandez is term limited and is running for Mayor of Santa Rosa. His party nominated incumbent Santa Rosa Mayor Arlene Arcillas.

2016 Philippine House of Representatives election in Laguna's 1st District
Party	Candidate	Votes	%
Liberal	Arlene Arcillas-Nazareno	196,440	100%
Total votes		196,440	100
Liberal hold			

==== 2nd District ====
Joaquin Chipeco, Jr. is the incumbent, he will stand unopposed for reelection.

2016 Philippine House of Representatives election in Laguna's 2nd District
Party	Candidate	Votes	%
Liberal	Joaquin Chipeco, Jr.	136,402	100%
Total votes		136,402	100
Liberal hold			

==== 3rd District ====
Sol Aragones is the incumbent. Her opponent is former Congressman and Former San Pablo Mayor Florante Aquino. And she got the highest vote for the position in this election.

2016 Philippine House of Representatives election in Laguna's 3rd District
Party	Candidate	Votes	%
UNA	Sol Aragones	154,339	71.12
Liberal	Florante Aquino	40,783	18.79
NPC	Damaso Amante	19,938	9.18
Lakas	Maria Christina Villamor	1,923	0.88
Total votes		216,983	100

==== 4th District ====
Benjamin Agarao Jr. is the incumbent and his opponent is former Congressman Edgar San Luis.

2016 Philippine House of Representatives election in Laguna's 4th District
Party	Candidate	Votes	%
Liberal	Benjamin Agarao Jr.	137,058	57.55
NUP	Edgar San Luis	99,262	41.68
UNA	Fidel Santos	1,803	0.75
Total votes		238,123	100

==== Biñan ====
Incumbent Mayor Marlyn Alonte-Naguiat will run for the newly created Lone District unopposed.

2016 Philippine House of Representatives election in Biñan's Lone District
Party	Candidate	Votes	%
Liberal	Marlyn Alonte-Naguiat	88,773	100%
Total votes		88,773	100
Liberal hold			

==== Provincial Board Members ====
Party	Votes	%	Seats
UNA	671,761	29.88	4
Nacionalista	912,395	40.59	3
Liberal	471,173	20.96	2
NUP	100,946	4.49	1
PGP	66,626	2.96	0
PDP–Laban	25,187	1.12	0
Ex officio seats			3
Total	2,248,088	100.00	13

==== 1st District ====
- Cities: Biñan, Santa Rosa City, San Pedro City

2016 Provincial Board Election in 1st District of Laguna
Party	Candidate	Votes	%
Nacionalista	Dave Almarinez	201,470	23.25
UNA	JM Carait	157,205	18.14
Liberal	Carlo Almoro	133,784	15.44
Nacionalista	Gabnulang Alatiit	92,432	10.66
Liberal	Marielle Micor	87,123	10.05
UNA	Gherome Eric Ejercito	78,786	9.09
Nacionalista	Leslie Lu	78,674	9.08
PGP	Grandyll Oca	13,211	1.52
PGP	Jesus Abunda, Sr.	11,960	1.38
PGP	Alvin Abaja	11,682	1.34
Total votes		866,327	100

==== 2nd District ====
- Cities: Cabuyao, Calamba
- Municipality: Bay, Los Baños

2016 Provincial Board Election in 2nd District of Laguna
Party	Candidate	Votes	%
Nacionalista	Ruth Mariano-Hernandez	241,745	31.66
Nacionalista	Pursino Oruga	149,874	19.62
UNA	Lian Aldabe	148,662	19.46
Nacionalista	Neptali Bagnes	148,200	19.40
UNA	June Ebron	45,312	5.93
PGP	Lito Caldeo	29,773	3.89
Total votes		763,566	100

==== 3rd District ====
- Cities: San Pablo City
- Municipality: Alaminos, Calauan, Liliw. Nagcarlan, Rizal, Victoria

2016 Provincial Board Election in 3rd District of Laguna
Party	Candidate	Votes	%
UNA	Dante Amante	91,622	28.84
UNA	Abi Yu	85,942	27.05
Liberal	Azenith Briones	55,377	17.43
Liberal	Geriz Bigol	35,765	11.26
PDP–Laban	Efren Cosinas	25,187	7.93
Liberal	Marvin Gerard Tunay	20,530	6.46
Liberal	Robinson Abital	3,184	1
Total votes		317,607	100

==== 4th District ====
- Municipalities: Cavinti, Famy, Kalayaan, Luisiana, Lumban, Mabitac, Magdalena, Majayjay, Paete, Pagsanjan, Pakil, Pangil, Pila, Santa Cruz, Santa Maria, Siniloan

2016 Provincial Board Election in 4th District of Laguna
Party	Candidate	Votes	%
Liberal	Benjo Agarao	135,410	45.04
NUP	Rai-Ann Agustine San Luis	100,946	33.58
UNA	George Gerald Ejercito	64,232	21.36
Total votes		300,588	100

== City and municipal elections ==
All municipalities of Laguna, Biñan, Cabuyao, Calamba, San Pablo City, San Pedro City and Santa Rosa City will elect mayor and vice-mayor this election. The candidates for mayor and vice mayor with the highest number of votes wins the seat; they are voted separately, therefore, they may be of different parties when elected. Below is the list of mayoralty candidates of each city and municipalities per district.

=== 1st District ===
- Cities: San Pedro City, Santa Rosa City

==== San Pedro City ====
Incumbent Lourdes Cataquiz is running for reelection. His opponents are incumbent Vice Mayor Rafael Campos, Michael Casacop and Eugenio Ynion, Jr.

San Pedro City Mayoral election
Party	Candidate	Votes	%
Nacionalista	Lourdes Catáquiz	52,398	43.72
PDP–Laban	Rafael Campos	33,462	27.92
NPC	Eugenio Ynion, Jr.	31,454	26.24
PRP	Michael Casacop	2,528	2.10
Total votes		119,842	100

Incumbent Rafael Campos is running for Mayor. His party nominated Iryne Vierneza, daughter of former Mayor Felicisimo Vierneza. Her opponents are incumbent councilor Diwa Tayao and former Vice Mayor Norvic Solidum.

San Pedro City Vice Mayoral election
Party	Candidate	Votes	%
PDP–Laban	Iryne Vierneza	41,861	36.71
Nacionalista	Diwa Tayao	38,861	34.08
NPC	Norvic Solidum	33,283	29.19
Total votes		114,005	100

==== Santa Rosa City ====
Incumbent Arlene Arcillas is term limited and is running for Congress. Her party nominated incumbent Congressman Danilo Fernandez.

Santa Rosa City mayoralty election
Party	Candidate	Votes	%
Liberal	Danilo Fernandez	81,680	59.84
NPC	Arnel Gomez	47,784	35.01
PDP–Laban	Alicia Lazaga	7,022	5.14
Total votes		136,486	100

Incumbent Arnel Gomez is running for Mayor.

Santa Rosa City vice mayoralty election
Party	Candidate	Votes	%
Liberal	Arnold Arcillas	78,208	59.81
Nacionalista	Ma. Theresa Aala	35,509	27.15
PDP–Laban	Sonia Laserna	17,025	13.02
Total votes		130,742	100

=== 2nd District ===
- Cities: Cabuyao, Calamba
- Municipality: Bay, Los Baños

==== Cabuyao ====
Cabuyao mayoral election
Party	Candidate	Votes	%
PDP–Laban	Rommel Gecolea	43,604	34.30
Liberal	Julio Alcasabas	40,082	31.60
Nacionalista	Ismael Hemedes	26,719	21.00
UNA	Jaime Batallones	16,604	13.10
Total votes		127,009	

Cabuyao vice mayoral election
Party	Candidate	Votes	%
Liberal	Jose Benson Aguillo	46,487	38.90
Nacionalista	Jun Hemedes, Jr.	38,448	32.20
UNA	Benjamin Del Rosario	34,454	28.90
Total votes		119.389	

==== Calamba ====
Both Mayor Justin Chipeco and Vice Mayor Roseller Rizal will stand unopposed for reelection.

Calamba mayoral election
Party	Candidate	Votes	%
Nacionalista	Justin Marc Chipeco	148,001	100
Total votes		148,001	100
Nacionalista hold			

Calamba vice mayoral election
Party	Candidate	Votes	%
Nacionalista	Roseller Rizal	141,987	100
Total votes		141,987	100
Nacionalista hold			

==== Bay ====
Bay Mayoral election
Party	Candidate	Votes	%
UNA	Bruno Ramos	21,562	
Total votes			100
UNA hold			

Bay Vice Mayoral election
Party	Candidate	Votes	%
PGP	Jose Padrid	15,249	
Nacionalista	Leonardo Malagno	6,933	
UNA	Cesar Comia	4,629	
Total votes			100

==== Los Baños ====
Los Baños Mayoral election
Party	Candidate	Votes	%
Liberal	Caesar Perez	34,441	
Independent	Leo De Guzman	4,384	
Independent	Rodelo Pabalate	1,886	
Independent	Laurence Fandiño	1,788	
Total votes			100

Los Baños Vice Mayoral election
Party	Candidate	Votes	%
Liberal	Copie Alipon	33,854	100
Total votes		33,854	100
Liberal hold			

=== 3rd District ===
- City: San Pablo City
- Municipality: Alaminos, Calauan, Liliw. Nagcarlan, Rizal, Victoria

==== San Pablo City ====
San Pablo City Mayoral election
Party	Candidate	Votes	%
UNA	Loreto Amante	73,561	71.02
Liberal	Angelo Adriano	30,019	28.98
Total votes		103,580	100.00

San Pablo City Vice Mayoral election
Party	Candidate	Votes	%
UNA	Angie Yang	65,605	66.32%
Liberal	Fernando See	33,312	33.68%
Total votes		98,917	100.00

==== Alaminos ====
Alaminos Mayoral election
Party	Candidate	Votes	%
UNA	Loreto Masa	9,173	
Liberal	Lorenzo Zuñiga, Jr.	7,178	
Nacionalista	Levy Magampon	5,536	
Lakas	Mario Cutay	78	
Total votes			100

Alaminos Vice Mayoral election
Party	Candidate	Votes	%
Nacionalista	Ruben Alvarez	9,715	
UNA	Armando Bueser	6,155	
Liberal	Darwin Tolentino	4,753	
Total votes			100

==== Calauan ====
Calauan Mayoral election
Party	Candidate	Votes	%
UNA	Buenafrido Berris	18,197	
Nacionalista	Kingsly Kraft	8,668	
Total votes			

Calauan Vice Mayoral election
Party	Candidate	Votes	%
UNA	Allan Jun Sanchez	12,692	
Lakas	Joseph Larona	7,086	
Nacionalista	June Brion	6,001	
Total votes			

==== Liliw ====
Liliw Mayoral election
Party	Candidate	Votes	%
Liberal	Eric Sulibit	13,505	100
Total votes		13,505	100
Liberal hold			

Liliw Vice Mayoral election
Party	Candidate	Votes	%
Liberal	Pablo Orioste	8,423	50.9%
Bangon Pilipinas	Raymond Pales	8,125	49.1%
Total votes		16,548	100

==== Nagcarlan ====
Nagcarlan Mayoral election
Party	Candidate	Votes	%
Liberal	Nelson Osuna	15,568	
UNA	Ody Arcasetas	14,562	
Total votes		100	

Nagcarlan Vice Mayoral election
Party	Candidate	Votes	%
PDP–Laban	Amie Malabag-Hernandez	18,332	
UNA	Val Castelo	10,292	
Total votes		100	

==== Rizal ====
Rizal Mayoral election
Party	Candidate	Votes	%
UNA	Antonino Aurelio	5,475	
Liberal	Jeffrey Palce	4,402	
Total votes			

Rizal Vice Mayoral election
Party	Candidate	Votes	%
PMP	Vener Muñoz	6,108	
NPC	Ferdinand Sumague	1,934	
NUP	Marlon Solquia	1,582	
Total votes			100

==== Victoria ====
Victoria Mayoral election
Party	Candidate	Votes	%
Liberal	Raul Gonzales	9,832	
UNA	Florencio Laraño	9,754	
Total votes			100

Victoria Vice Mayoral election
Party	Candidate	Votes	%
UNA	Sonny Lazaro	6,709	
Nacionalista	Wilfredo Herradura	6,282	
Liberal	Fely Maristela	6,090	
Total votes			

=== 4th District ===
- Municipality: Cavinti, Famy, Kalayaan, Luisiana, Lumban, Mabitac, Magdalena, Majayjay, Laguna, Paete, Pagsanjan, Pakil, Pangil, Pila, Santa Cruz, Santa Maria, Siniloan

==== Cavinti ====
Cavinti Mayoral election
Party	Candidate	Votes	%
Liberal	Milbert Oliveros	6,607	
PDP–Laban	Florcelie Esguerra	3,733	
UNA	Bethoven Dela Torre	2,503	
Total votes			

Cavinti Vice Mayoral election
Party	Candidate	Votes	%
Liberal	Anita Baeyens	7,326	64.67
UNA	Jojo Mesina	4,003	35.33
Total votes		11,329	100

==== Famy ====
Famy Mayoral election
Party	Candidate	Votes	%
Liberal	Edwin Pangilinan	3,137	
Nacionalista	Renonia Muramatsu	2,747	
NPC	Emmanuel Acomular	2,402	
Total votes			100

Famy Vice Mayoral election
Party	Candidate	Votes	%
Liberal	Ellen Andaya	3,162	
Nacionalista	Melvin Laminero	2,660	
PDP–Laban	Vincent Llamas III	2,090	
Total votes			100

==== Kalayaan ====
Kalayaan Mayoral election
Party	Candidate	Votes	%
Nacionalista	Leni Adao	3,737	
Liberal	Sandy Laganapan	3,500	
NPC	Darwin Ponce	3,414	
UNA	Russel Laganas	878	
PDP–Laban	Antonio Dela Paz	141	
Total votes		11,670	100

Kalayaan Vice Mayoral election
Party	Candidate	Votes	%
NUP	Laarni Lopez	4,290	
UNA	Kenneth Ragaza	4,221	
Liberal	Marty Sasondoncillo	2,678	
Total votes		11,189	100

==== Luisiana ====
Luisiana Mayoral election
Party	Candidate	Votes	%
UNA	Nestor Rondilla	6,952	63.25
Nacionalista	Manuel Rondilla	3,995	36.34
Independent	Bobby Estrellado	45	0.41
Total votes		10,992	100

Luisiana Vice Mayoral election
Party	Candidate	Votes	%
UNA	Luibic Jacob	6,919	66.19
Nacionalista	Wilfredo Palad	3,535	33.81
Total votes		10,454	100

==== Lumban ====
Lumban Mayoral election
Party	Candidate	Votes	%
NPC	Rolan Ubatay	6,282	
Liberal	Reynato Añonuevo	5,679	
UNA	Fredy Paraiso	4,247	
Total votes			100

Lumban Vice Mayoral election
Party	Candidate	Votes	%
NPC	Belen Raga	8,495	
Liberal	Pamela De Ramos	4,200	
UNA	Mamerta Lagrosa	3,093	
Total votes			100

==== Mabitac ====
Mabitac Mayoral election
Party	Candidate	Votes	%
Liberal	Ronald Sana	5,508	54.85
NPC	Gerardo Fader	4,534	45.15
Total votes		10,042	100

Mabitac Vice Mayoral election
Party	Candidate	Votes	%
Liberal	Alberto Reyes	5,277	56.01
NPC	Kian Olarte	4,144	43.99
Total votes		9,421	100

==== Magdalena ====
Magdalena Mayoral election
Party	Candidate	Votes	%
Liberal	David Aventurado, Jr.	8,382	100
Total votes			100
Liberal hold			

Magdalena Vice Mayoral election
Party	Candidate	Votes	%
Liberal	Tato Burbos	8,038	100
Total votes			100
Liberal hold			

==== Majayjay ====
Majayjay Mayoral election
Party	Candidate	Votes	%
NPC	Jojo Clado	3,848	
Nacionalista	Larry Mentilla	3,624	
UNA	Godofredo Estupigan	2,002	
PRP	Allan Esmaquel	1,769	
Liberal	Victor Rodillas	1,646	
PDP–Laban	Froilan Gruezo	766	
Lakas	Rolando Araza	519	
Total votes			100

Majayjay Vice Mayoral election
Party	Candidate	Votes	%
Liberal	Eulogio Wilson Amorado	5,446	
UNA	Avelino Merestela	4,322	
Nacionalista	Manuel Danilo Vito	2,018	
NPC	Rexford Banawa	1,242	
PDP–Laban	Jhoul Barba	544	
Total votes			100

==== Paete ====
Paete Mayoral election
Party	Candidate	Votes	%
UNA	Mutuk Bagabaldo	6,871	55.7
NPC	Arcel Cadayona	5,464	44.3
Total votes		12,335	100

Paete Vice Mayoral election
Party	Candidate	Votes	%
Nacionalista	Gido Bagayana	4,831	
UNA	Aurelio Paraiso	4,592	
NPC	Elizabeth Calma	2,709	
Total votes			100

==== Pagsanjan ====
Pagsanjan Mayoral election
Party	Candidate	Votes	%
UNA	Girlie Ejercito	10,988	59.19
Nacionalista	Terryl Gamit-Talabong	7,575	40.80
Total votes		18,563	100

Pagsanjan Vice Mayoral election
Party	Candidate	Votes	%
Nacionalista	Peter Casius Trinidad	8,900	50.52
UNA	Melvin Madriaga	8,714	49.47
Total votes		17,614	100

==== Pakil ====
Pakil Mayoral election
Party	Candidate	Votes	%
Nacionalista	Vince Soriano	6,022	55.37
NPC	Totoy Martinez	4,853	44.63
Total votes		10,875	100

Pakil Vice Mayoral election
Party	Candidate	Votes	%
Liberal	Melody Familara	3,940	37.01%
NPC	Amy Del Moro	3,058	28.72%
Lakas	Rowen Macuha	2,294	21.55%
UNA	Alfredo Maray, Jr.	1,355	12.73%
Total votes		10,647	100

==== Pangil ====
Incumbent Mayor Jovit Reyes of UNA seeks for reelection against councilor Oscar "Ka Popoy" Rafanan of Liberal Party.

Pangil mayoral election
Party	Candidate	Votes	%
Liberal	Oscar Rafanan	6,076	57.11
UNA	Jovit Reyes	4,483	42.14
PGP	Freddie Acaylar	79	0.74
Total votes		10,638	100

Incumbent Vice Mayor Alberto "Jun" Astoveza Jr. of LP will run for reelection against UNA's bet councilor Al Pajarillo. This is the second time that Astoveza and Pajarillo will fight for the vice mayoral place.

Pangil vice mayoral election
Party	Candidate	Votes	%
UNA	Al Pajarillo	5,093	49.77
Liberal	Alberto Astoveza	4,625	45.19
PGP	Nani Mendez	515	5.03
Total votes		10,233	100

==== Pila ====
Pila Mayoral election
Party	Candidate	Votes	%
UNA	Edgardo Ramos	13,286	54.91
Liberal	Boy Quiat	9,600	39.67
Lakas	Lorenzo Calubayan	1,308	5.40
Total votes		24,194	100

Pila Vice Mayoral election
Party	Candidate	Votes	%
Liberal	Queen Marilyd Alarva	12,175	53.45
UNA	Querubin Relova, Jr.	10,601	46.54
Total votes		22,776	100

==== Santa Cruz ====
Incumbent Mayor Domingo G. Panganiban is seeking for reelection for his third and final term. His opponent is his successor, former Mayor Ariel Magcalas.

Santa Cruz Mayoral election
Party	Candidate	Votes	%
Liberal	Domingo Panganiban	32,605	69.07
UNA	Ariel Magcalas	14,604	30.93
Total votes		47,209	100

Santa Cruz Vice Mayoral election
Party	Candidate	Votes	%
Liberal	Louie De Leon	25,836	55.99
UNA	Efren Diaz	20,306	44.01
Total votes		46,142	100

==== Santa Maria ====
Santa Maria Mayoral election
Party	Candidate	Votes	%
Nacionalista	Antonio Carolino	11,163	100
Total votes		11,163	100
Nacionalista hold			

Santa Maria Vice Mayoral election
Party	Candidate	Votes	%
Nacionalista	Virginia Tuazon	10,278	100
Total votes		10,278	100
Nacionalista hold			

==== Siniloan ====
Siniloan Mayoral election
Party	Candidate	Votes	%
Nacionalista	Eddie Tibay	9,349	51.63
Liberal	Juanita Acero	8,760	48.37
Total votes		18,109	100

Siniloan Vice Mayoral election
Party	Candidate	Votes	%
Nacionalista	Roberto Acoba	10,810	62.50
Liberal	Edgardo Coladilla	6,486	37.50
Total votes		17,296	100

=== Biñan ===
Biñan Mayoral election
Party	Candidate	Votes	%
Liberal	Arman Dimaguila	64,262	52.36
NPC	Cookie Yatco	37,161	30.28
PMP	Boy Perez	21,301	17.35
Total votes		122,724	100

Biñan Vice Mayoral election
Party	Candidate	Votes	%
Liberal	Gel Alonte	77,672	68.92
NPC	Bobet Borja	35,018	31.07
Total votes		112,690	100
