= Angelica Jones =

Filipino actress-comedian, politician (born 1983)

Angelica B. Alarva
- Alarva in 2026.

Member of the Laguna Provincial Board from the 3rd district
- Incumbent
- Assumed office June 30, 2025
- In office June 30, 2019 – June 30, 2022
- In office June 30, 2010 – June 30, 2016

Personal details
- Born: Angelica Banaag Alarva; January 20, 1983 (age 43) Rizal, Laguna, Philippines
- Party: PFP (2018–2021; 2024–present)
- Other political affiliations: PROMDI (2021–2024); Liberal (2015–2018); UNA (2012–2015); Nacionalista (2009–2012); Lakas-CMD (2008–2009); KAMPI (2006–2008)
- Relations: Larry O. Dimayuga (cousin)
- Occupation: Actress, politician

Angelica Banaag Alarva (born January 20, 1983), better known by her stage name Angelica Jones, is a Filipino singer, actress and politician. She is also known as the singer who sang the novelty song "Miss Flawless".

== Personal life ==
She was born as Angelica Banaag Alarva in Rizal, Laguna. In 2024, Jones appealed for the acknowledgment and signing of the birth certificate of her 11-year-old son, Angelo Timothy Benedict Alday, by his biological father, San Jose, Batangas Councilor Gerald Alday per the Family Code of the Philippines for graduation. Jones was also in a relationship with Nueva Ecija Board Member Jojo Matias.

== Political career ==
Alarva served as Board Member from the 3rd district of Laguna from 2010 to 2016, from 2019 to 2022, and since 2025. She also unsuccessfully ran for vice governor of Laguna in 2016 and for representative of Laguna's 3rd district in 2022.

== Filmography ==
=== Film ===
| Year | Title | Role(s) | Notes | Ref(s) |
|---|---|---|---|---|
| 2003 | Mr. Suave | Venus | | |
| 2003 | Basta't Kasama Kita | —N/a | | |
| 2006 | Lagot Ka Sa Kuya Ko | —N/a | | |
| 2006 | Enteng Kabisote 3: Okay Ka, Fairy Ko: The Legend Goes On and On and On | —N/a | | |
| 2023 | Loyalista: The Untold Story of Imelda Papin | Alona Alegre | | |
| 2024 | When Magic Hurts | —N/a | | |

=== Television ===
| Year | Title | Role(s) | Notes | Ref(s) |
|---|---|---|---|---|
| 1992–1996 | That's Entertainment | —N/a | | |
| 2003–2005 | Masayang Tanghali Bayan | —N/a | | |
| 2003–2004 | Basta't Kasama Kita | Shai | | |
| 2003–2004 | Chowtime Na! | —N/a | | |
| 2007 | La Vendetta | —N/a | | |
| 2015 | FPJ's Ang Probinsyano | —N/a | | |
| 2015 | Eat Bulaga! | Herself | | |
| 2015 | Sabado Badoo | Herself | | |
| 2016 | Maalaala Mo Kaya | —N/a | | |
| 2016 | Conan, My Beautician | Kiray | | |
| 2017 | It's Showtime | Herself | | |
| 2017 | Tadhana | —N/a | | |
| 2018 | Magpakailanman | —N/a | | |
| 2019 | One of the Baes | —N/a | | |
| 2019 | Mars Pa More | —N/a | | |
| 2020 | Kaibigan The Series | —N/a | | |
| 2020 | Dear Uge | —N/a | | |
| 2021 | John En Ellen | —N/a | | |
| 2021 | I Can See You | —N/a | | |
| 2024 | Black Rider | —N/a | | |
