= Alaminos, Laguna =

Municipality in Laguna, Philippines

Alaminos
- Municipality
- Municipality of Alaminos
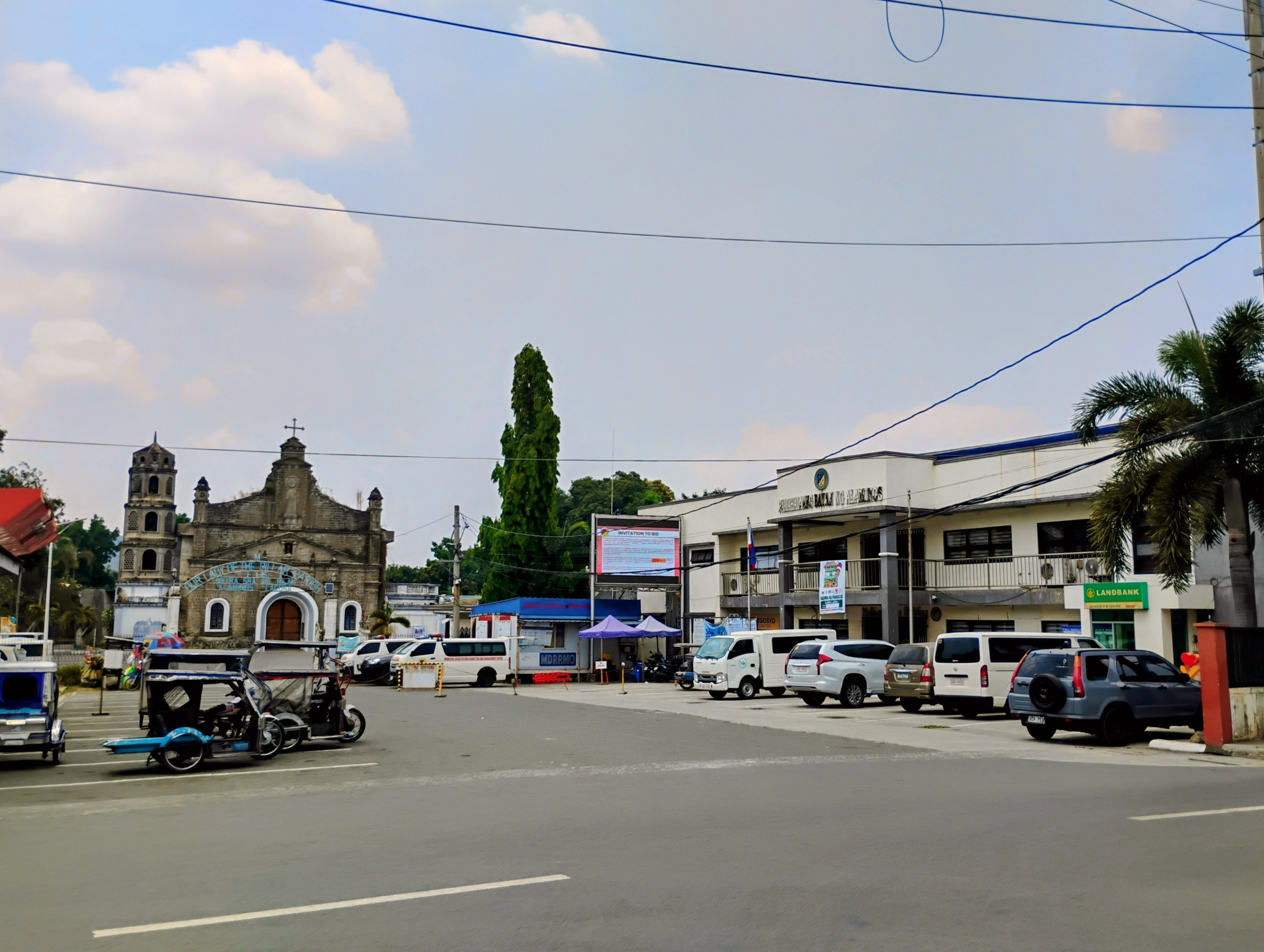
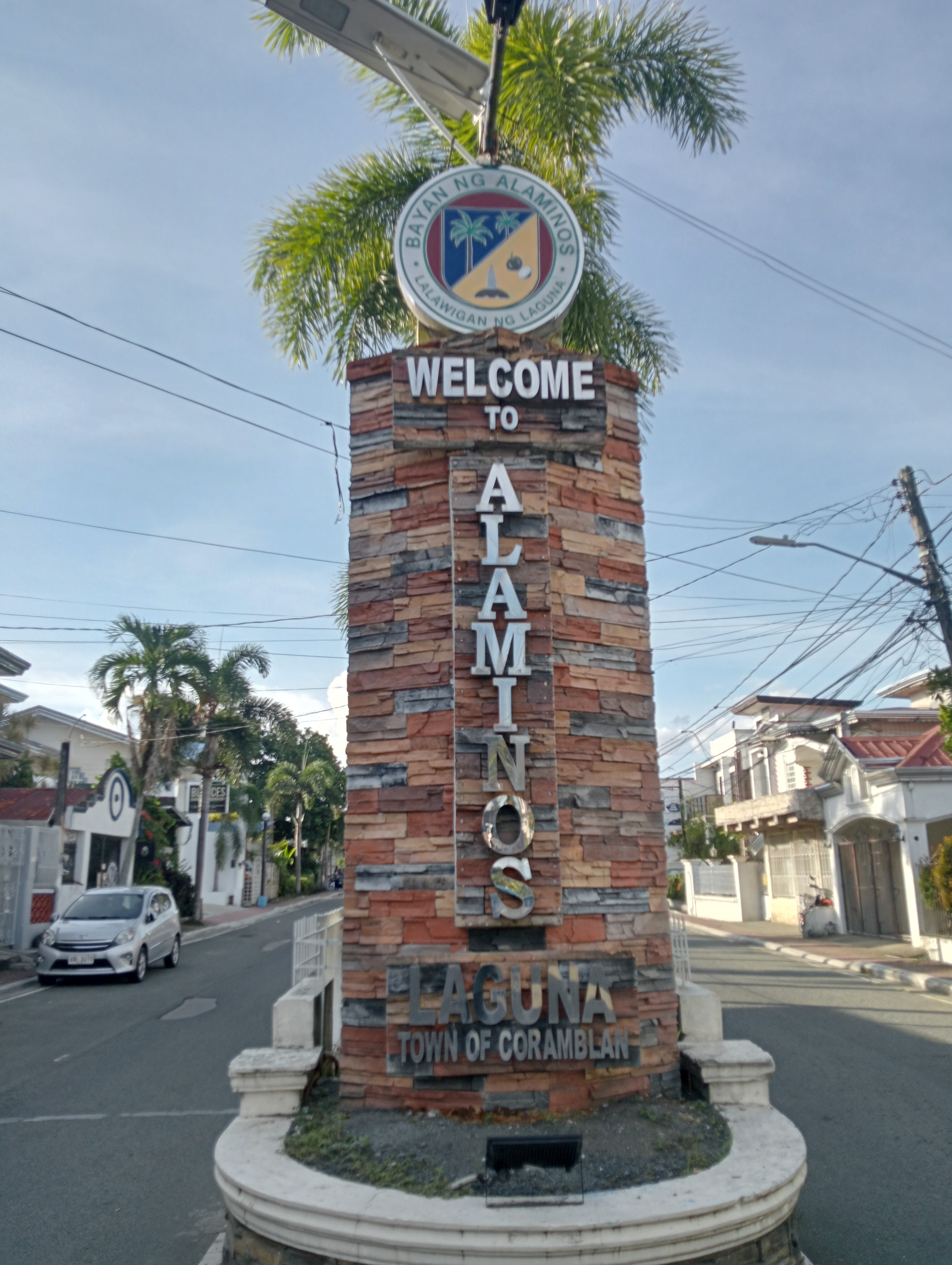
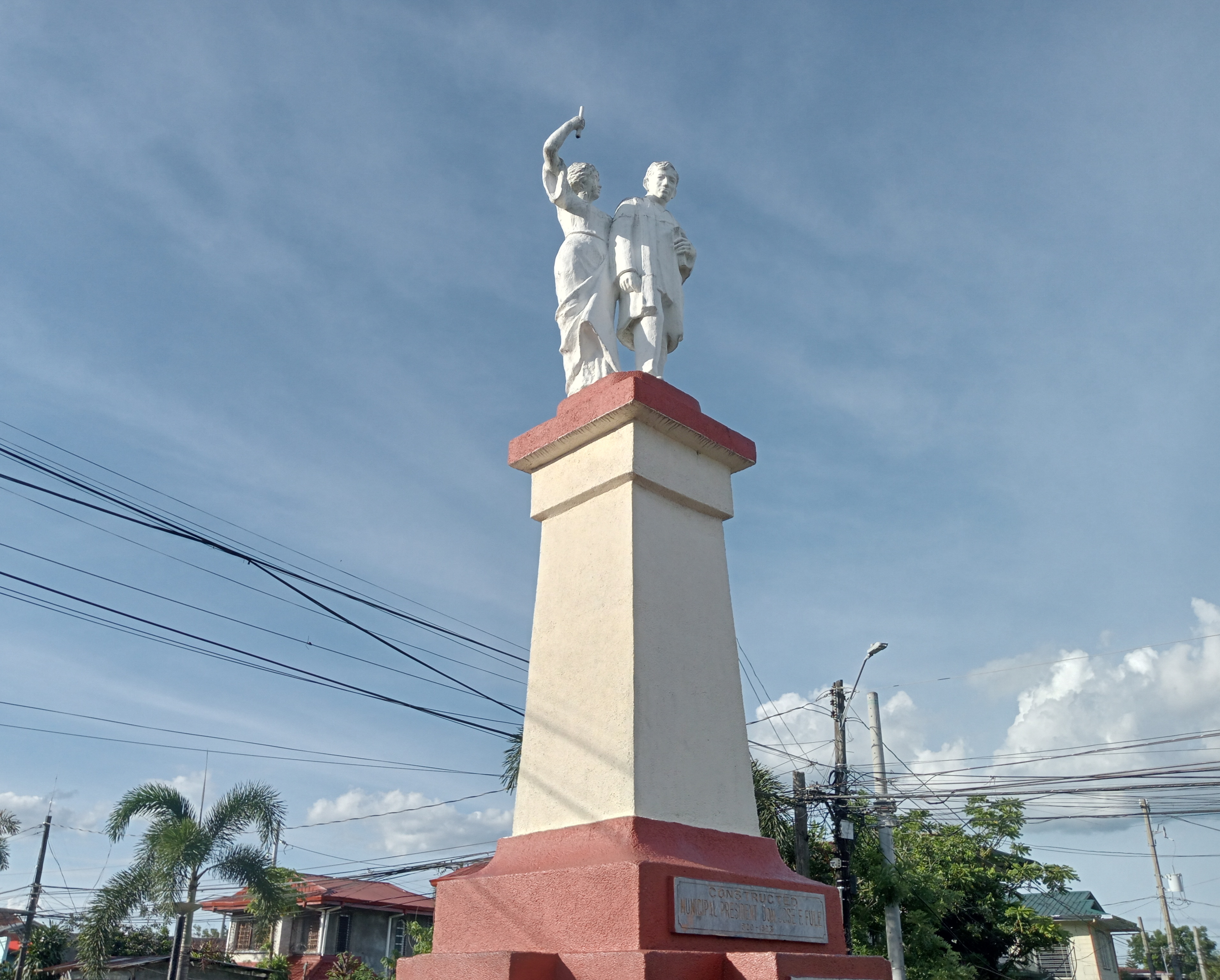
- Alaminos Church and Municipal Hall Alaminos Welcome Marker Jose Rizal Monument of Alaminos

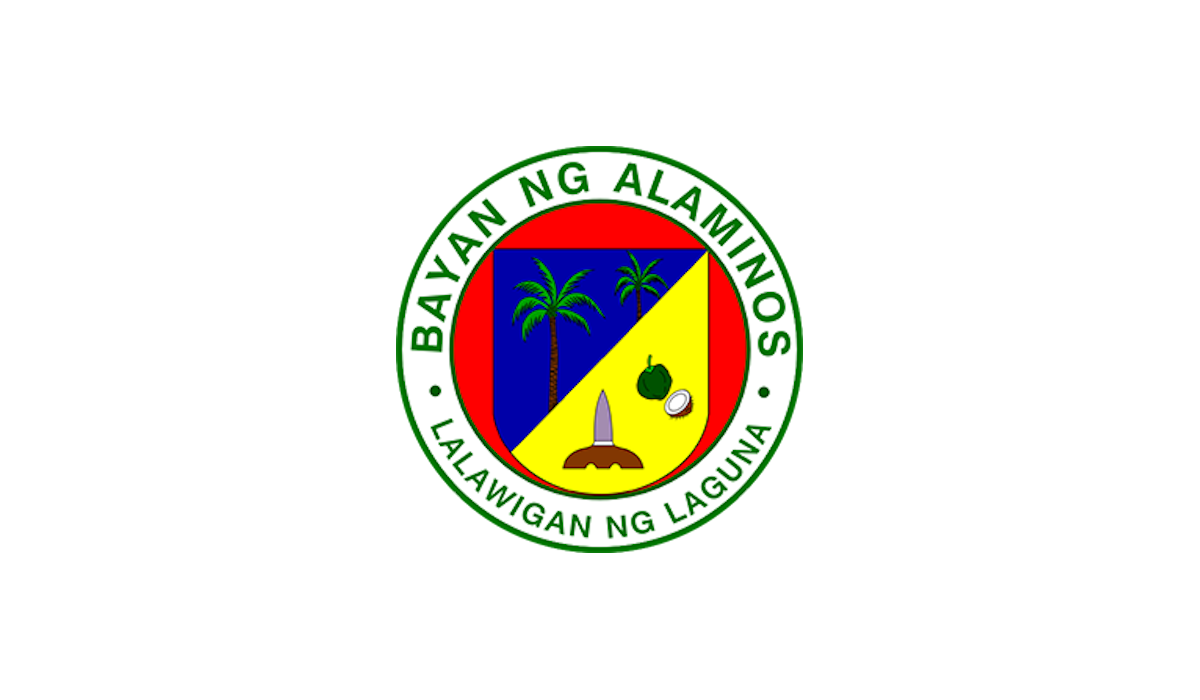
- Flag Seal

- Map of Laguna with Alaminos highlighted
- Interactive map of Alaminos
- Location within the Philippines
- Coordinates: 14°03′48″N 121°14′42″E
- Country: Philippines
- Region: Calabarzon
- Province: Laguna
- District: 3rd district
- Founded: 1873
- Annexation to San Pablo: October 12, 1903
- Reestablished: January 1, 1916
- Named for: Juan de Alaminos Nivera
- Barangays: 15 (see Barangays)

Government
  - Type: Sangguniang Bayan
  - Mayor: Ericson R. Lopez (PFP)
  - Vice Mayor: Victor L. Mitra (PFP)
  - Representative: Loreto Amante (PFP)
  - Municipal Council: Members: Alvin P. Isleta; Edgardo R. Briz; Juan D. Briz; Ruben D. Alvarez; Bernadeth V. Alvarez; Lorelei M. Pampolina; Jacklyn A. Villanueva; Nicole A. Pampolina
  - Electorate: 34,979 voters (2025)

Area
  - Total: 57.46 km^{2} (22.19 sq mi)
- Elevation: 121 m (397 ft)
- Highest elevation: 543 m (1,781 ft)
- Lowest elevation: 59 m (194 ft)

Population (2024 census)
  - Total: 53,589
  - Density: 932.6/km^{2} (2,416/sq mi)
  - Households: 13,249

Economy
  - Income class: 1st municipal income class
  - Poverty incidence: 9.03% (2023)
  - Revenue: ₱ 291.2 million (2024)
  - Assets: ₱ 784.2 million (2024)
  - Expenditure: ₱ 112 million (2024)
  - Liabilities: ₱ 112.7 million (2024)

Service provider
  - Electricity: Manila Electric Company (Meralco)
- Time zone: UTC+8 (PST)
- ZIP code: 4001
- PSGC: 0403401000
- IDD : area code: +63 (0)49
- Native languages: Tagalog
- Patron saint: Our Lady of the Pillar
- Website: https://alaminoslaguna.com/

Alaminos, officially the Municipality of Alaminos (Tagalog: Bayan ng Alaminos), is a municipality in the province of Laguna, Philippines. According to the 2024 census, it has a population of 53,589 people.

== Etymology ==
Alaminos got its name from Capitan-General Juan de Alaminos Nivera, the chief executive of Batangas in which the area the present-day municipality covers was once part of.

== History ==
Alaminos originated as a barrio of San Pablo, which was then a town in the province of Batangas. It was initially known as Trenchera, a name referring to the presence of long and deep ravines in the area. The early inhabitants of Trenchera were believed to be insurrectionists, and possibly fugitives, who used these natural trenches as hiding places and as defense against Spanish authorities.

Sometime in 1873 when a certain Don Andres Penaloza was the Gobernadorcillo (equivalent to Mayor) of the town of San Pablo, Trenchera was formally separated and became a pueblo or town but remained part of the Batangas. Don Cirilo Baylon, a wealthy resident of Trenchera and with good command of the Spanish language, invited Captain-General Juan de Alaminos Nivera, the Chief Executive of the Batangas. The Captain-General accepted the invitation and came in a colorful carriage drawn by two horses. With Baylon leading, he was warmly received by the residents of Trenchera. Dona Gregoria Baylon, the younger sister of Cirilo presented bouquets of fresh flowers to the Captain-General.

During a program held in honor of the Captain-General and his party, Cirilo Baylon presented a petition from the residents requesting that Trenchera be established as a duly organized and recognized town. The petition was publicly read, and the Captain-General assured them that their request would be favorably considered. Within less than two months, the official proclamation declaring Trenchera a new *pueblo*, or town, arrived from Lipa.

At the same time, Baylon was appointed the first Gobernadorcillo or town mayor in concurrent capacity as Capitan de los Constables de Pueblo or the equivalent of the local police chief. In appreciation of the Capitan-General, the new pueblo was named Alaminos in 1873 and remained part of Batangas until 1903, when it was returned to San Pablo by virtue of Act No. 939. It was later reconstituted as an independent municipality in 1916.

== Geography ==
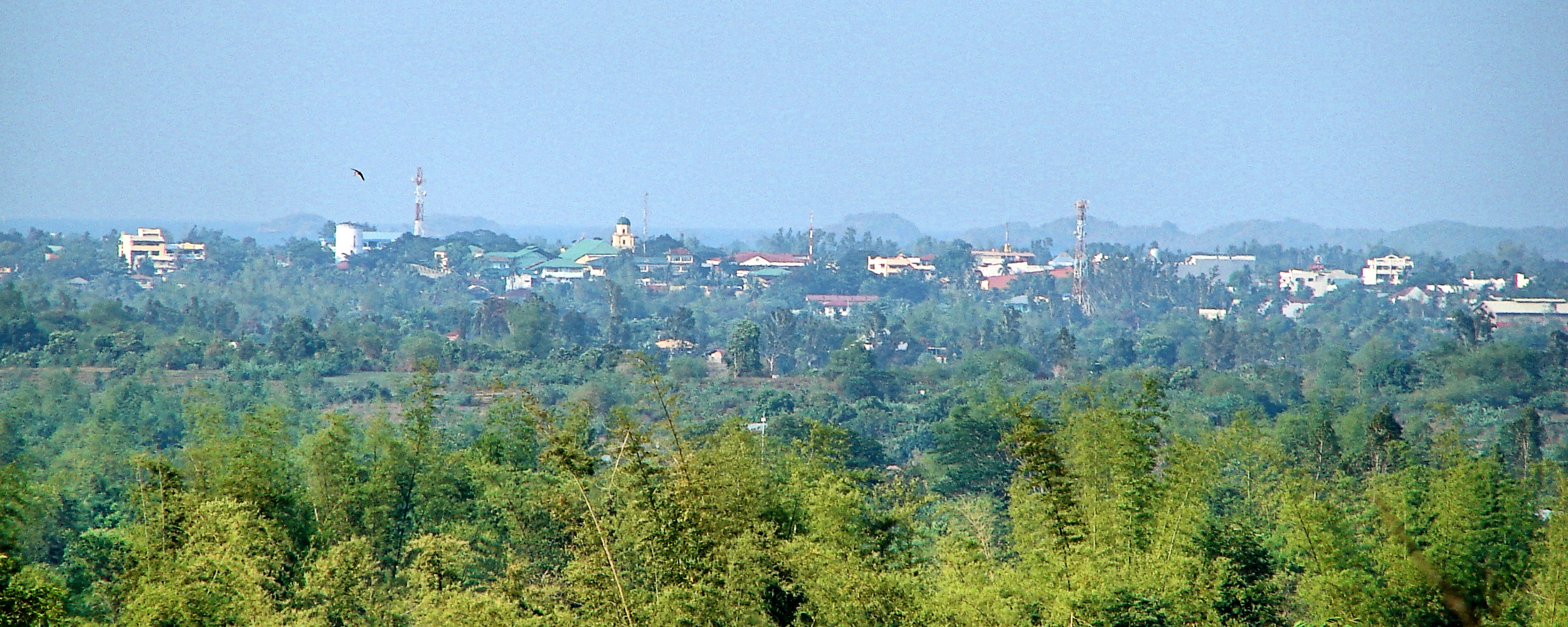
Skyline of Alaminos

Alaminos has a land area of 5,476 hectares (13,530 acres) and is situated 46 kilometers (29 mi) from Santa Cruz and 73 kilometers (45 mi) southeast of Manila. The municipalities of Calauan and Bay are located north of Alaminos, the city of San Pablo on the south and east and the city of Santo Tomas in Batangas province on its west.

There are three main rivers in Alaminos, namely Kaquinkong, Onipa and Tigas.

The Maharlika Highway passes through the municipality and is connected directly to Manila through the South Luzon Expressway.

=== Barangays ===
Alaminos is politically subdivided into 15 barangays, as indicated below. Each barangay consists of puroks and some have sitios.

Currently, there are 4 barangays which are classified as urban (highlighted in bold).

| PSGC | Barangay | Population | | | ±% p.a. | |
| | | 2024 | | 2010 | | |
|---|---|---|---|---|---|---|
| 0403401001 | Del Carmen | 2.2% | 1,185 | 1,089 | ▴ | 0.59% |
| 0403401002 | Palma | 5.7% | 3,071 | 2,251 | ▴ | 2.18% |
| 0403401003 | **Barangay I (Poblacion)** | 4.7% | 2,519 | 2,780 | ▾ | −0.68% |
| 0403401004 | **Barangay II (Poblacion)** | 4.8% | 2,571 | 2,634 | ▾ | −0.17% |
| 0403401005 | **Barangay III (Poblacion)** | 6.9% | 3,690 | 2,629 | ▴ | 2.38% |
| 0403401006 | **Barangay IV (Poblacion)** | 6.3% | 3,367 | 3,127 | ▴ | 0.51% |
| 0403401007 | San Agustin | 11.7% | 6,279 | 4,650 | ▴ | 2.11% |
| 0403401008 | San Andres | 8.8% | 4,709 | 3,180 | ▴ | 2.76% |
| 0403401009 | San Benito | 11.8% | 6,306 | 5,720 | ▴ | 0.68% |
| 0403401010 | San Gregorio | 6.6% | 3,522 | 3,294 | ▴ | 0.47% |
| 0403401011 | San Ildefonso | 5.7% | 3,054 | 2,479 | ▴ | 1.46% |
| 0403401012 | San Juan | 9.1% | 4,870 | 2,640 | ▴ | 4.34% |
| 0403401013 | San Miguel | 4.2% | 2,228 | 1,938 | ▴ | 0.97% |
| 0403401014 | San Roque | 4.6% | 2,443 | 1,536 | ▴ | 3.27% |
| 0403401015 | Santa Rosa | 7.0% | 3,775 | 3,579 | ▴ | 0.37% |
| | **Total** | | 53,589 | 43,526 | ▴ | 1.45% |

Brgy. San Gregorio is the biggest barangay measuring 840.6190 hectares followed by Brgy. Santa Rosa measuring 802.28 hectares.

=== Climate ===
Climate data for Alaminos, Laguna
| Month | Jan | Feb | Mar | Apr | May | Jun | Jul | Aug | Sep | Oct | Nov | Dec | Year |
|---|---|---|---|---|---|---|---|---|---|---|---|---|---|
| Mean daily maximum °C (°F) | 26 (79) | 27 (81) | 29 (84) | 31 (88) | 31 (88) | 29 (84) | 28 (82) | 28 (82) | 28 (82) | 28 (82) | 27 (81) | 26 (79) | 28 (83) |
| Mean daily minimum °C (°F) | 20 (68) | 20 (68) | 20 (68) | 21 (70) | 23 (73) | 23 (73) | 23 (73) | 23 (73) | 23 (73) | 22 (72) | 21 (70) | 21 (70) | 22 (71) |
| Average precipitation mm (inches) | 52 (2.0) | 35 (1.4) | 27 (1.1) | 27 (1.1) | 82 (3.2) | 124 (4.9) | 163 (6.4) | 144 (5.7) | 145 (5.7) | 141 (5.6) | 100 (3.9) | 102 (4.0) | 1,142 (45) |
| Average rainy days | 12.0 | 8.1 | 8.8 | 9.7 | 17.9 | 22.6 | 26.2 | 24.5 | 24.6 | 22.0 | 16.7 | 14.9 | 208 |
Source: Meteoblue

== Demographics ==
Population census of Alaminos

| Year | Pop. | ±% p.a. |
|---|---|---|
| 1903 | 4,135 | — |
| 1918 | 6,739 | +3.31% |
| 1939 | 8,817 | +1.29% |
| 1948 | 9,518 | +0.85% |
| 1960 | 13,860 | +3.18% |
| 1970 | 16,649 | +1.85% |

| Year | Pop. | ±% p.a. |
|---|---|---|
| 1975 | 18,504 | +2.14% |
| 1980 | 20,615 | +2.18% |
| 1990 | 27,412 | +2.89% |
| 1995 | 31,442 | +2.60% |
| 2000 | 36,120 | +3.02% |
| 2007 | 40,380 | +1.55% |

| Year | Pop. | ±% p.a. |
|---|---|---|
| 2010 | 43,526 | +2.77% |
| 2015 | 47,859 | +1.82% |
| 2020 | 51,619 | +1.60% |
| 2024 | 53,589 | +0.90% |

Source: Philippine Statistics Authority

In the 2024 census, the population of Alaminos, Laguna, was 53,589 people, with a density of 930 inhabitants per square kilometer or 2,400 inhabitants per square mile.

== Economy ==
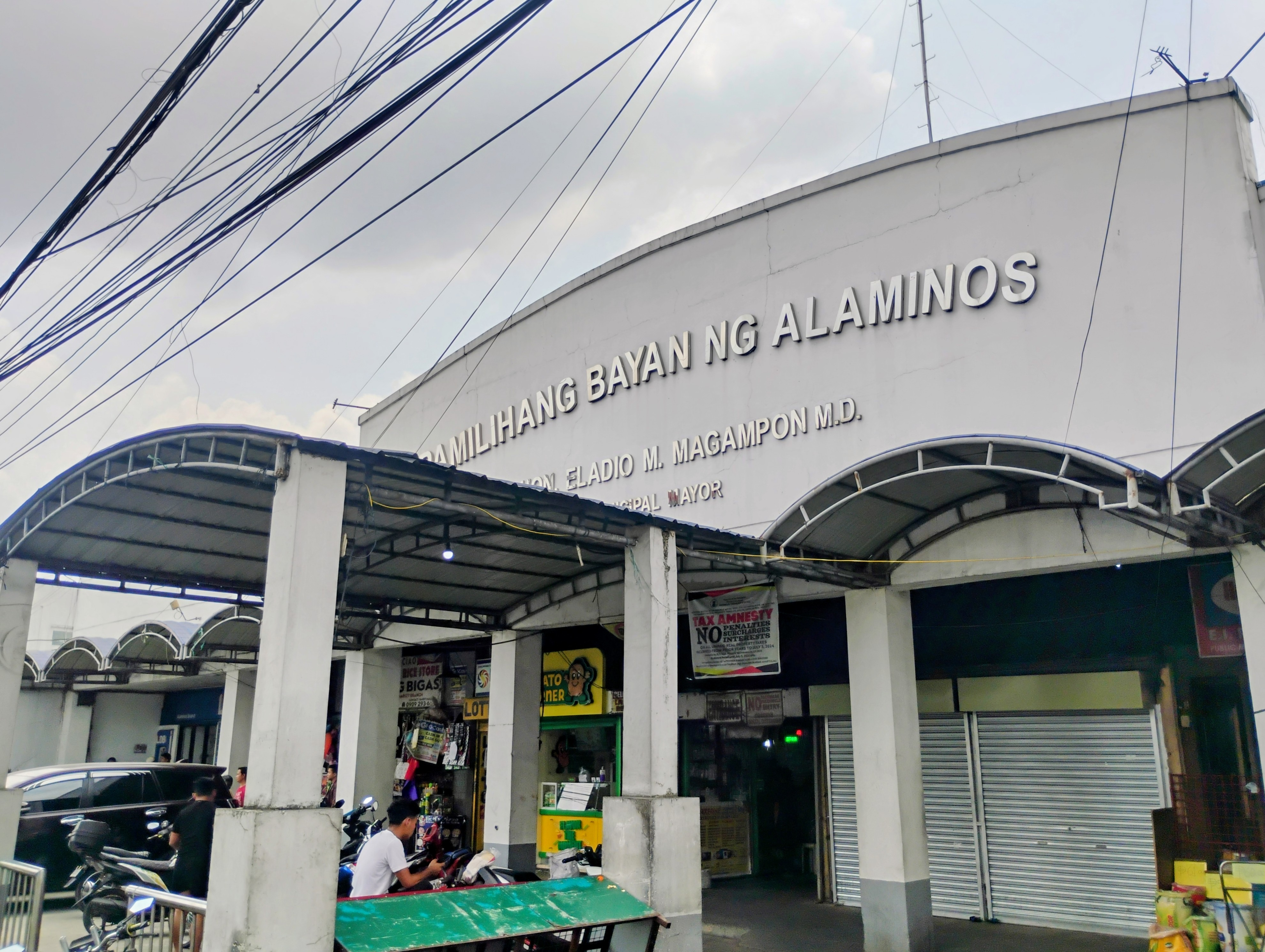
Alaminos Public Market

Poverty incidence of Alaminos (%)

Source: Philippine Statistics Authority

A 120-MW solar power plant with a 40MW/60MWh grid battery operates near the city.

== Government ==
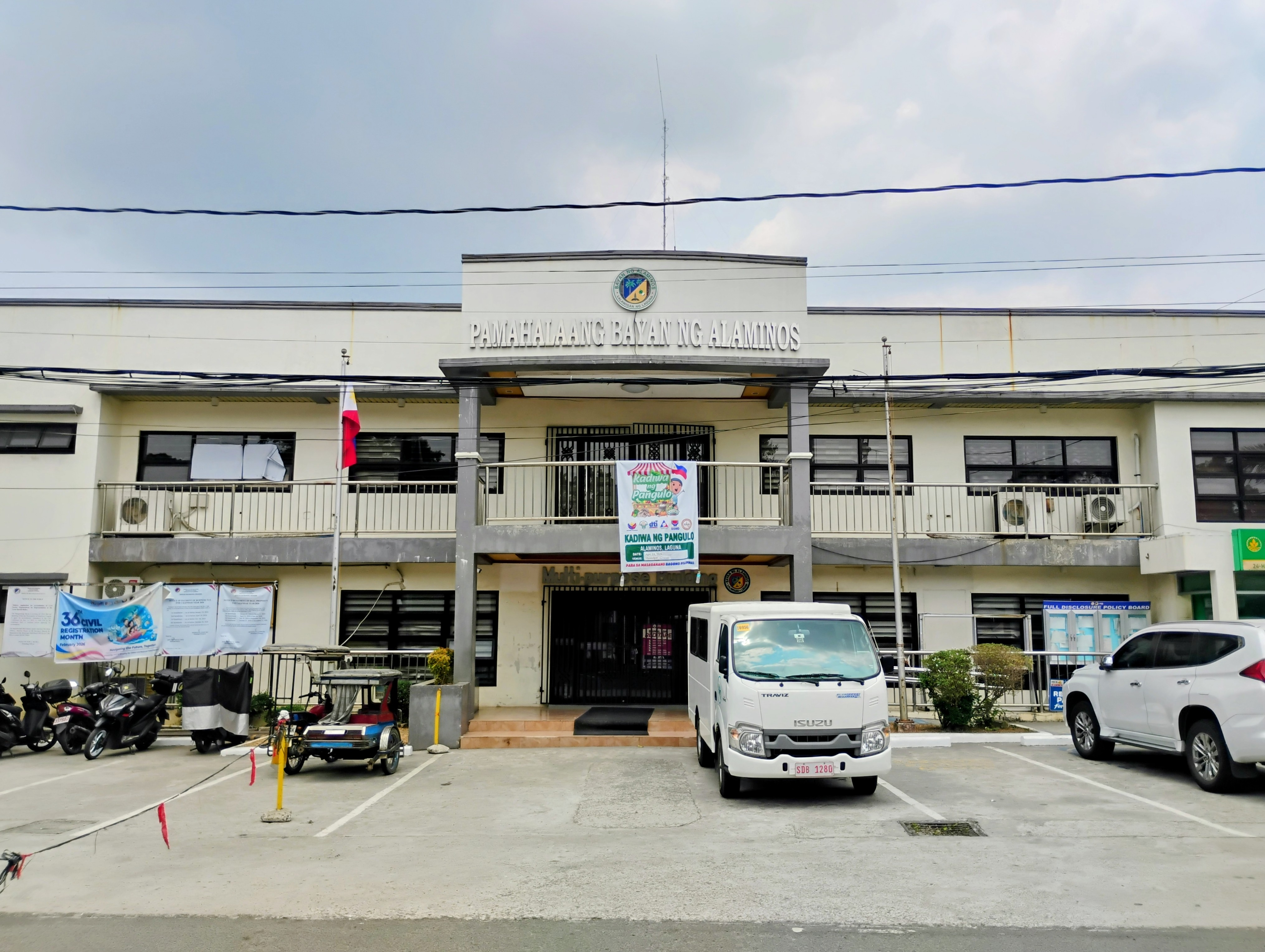
Alaminos Municipal Hall

Alaminos municipal officials (2025–present)
| Name | Party |
Mayor
| Eric Lopez | PFP |
Vice Mayor
| Victor L. Mitra | PFP |
Municipal Councilors
| Nicole A. Pampolina | Lakas |
| Jinky M.Pampolina | PFP |
| Bernadeth V. Alvarez | Nacionalista |
| Edgardo R. Briz | PFP |
| Jacklyn A. Villanueva | Nacionalista |
| Juan D. Briz | PDP–Laban |
| Alvin Isleta | Independent |
| Ruben Alvarez | PFP |

=== List of local chief executives ===
The following is the list of mayors of Alaminos since 1873. Hernandez Sr. and Masa were appointed as Mayors. Donato died in office, with Vice Mayor Flores assuming the position of mayor following Donato's death.

- Don Cirilo Baylon (1873-1875)
- Raymundo Faylona (1875-1878)
- Cirilo Baylon (1879-1881)
- Marcelino Tolentino (1882-1884)
- Policarpio Flores (1885-1887)
- Mauricio Abril (1888-1890)
- Sesinando Enriquez (1891-1893)
- Marcelino Fule (1894-1896)
- Jose Fule (1916-1919)
- Leodegario Avenido (1919-1922)
- Rafael Averion (1922-1925)
- Lucio Cubillejo (1926-1928)
- Francisco Fule (1928-1931)
- Andres Averion (1931-1934)
- Silvestre Silva (1934-1937)
- Nicasio Villanueva (1937-1940)
- Artemio Fule (1940-1943)
- Demetrio Hernandez Sr. (1944–1946)
- Felimon Masa (1947–1948)
- Daniel Fandiño (1948–1951)
- Lorenzo Dimayuga (1952–1955)
- Pedro De Villa (1956–1963)
- Casimiro Faylona (1968–1971)
- Pedro De Villa (1968–1971)
- Armando M. Bueser (1972–1979)
- Francisco Donato (1980–1982)
- Mariano Flores (1982–1987)
- Samuel F. Bueser (1988–1998)
- Demetrio P. Hernandez Jr. (1998–2001)
- Samuel F. Bueser (May 14, 2001 – 2007)
- Eladio M. Magampon (2007–2016)
- Loreto M. Masa (2016–2019)
- Eladio M. Magampon (2019–2021)
- Ruben Alvarez (2021–2022)
- Glenn Flores (2022–2025)
- Eric Lopez (2025–present)

== Culture ==
The religious patron of the town of Alaminos is the Our Lady of the Pillar. On October 12 annually, the town fiesta of Alaminos is celebrated. The town's parish church was founded in 1815 and was initially dedicated to Joachim before being replaced with Our Lady of the Pillar, whose image was found in a well in the town.

=== Special events/festivals ===
- Town Fiesta, October 12

== Education ==
The Alaminos Schools District Office governs all educational institutions within the municipality. It oversees the management and operations of all private and public, from primary to secondary schools.

=== Primary and elementary schools ===
- Alaminos Central School
- Cresmat Learning Center
- De Mesa Elementary School
- Del Carmen Elementary School
- Knights and Angels Montessori School
- Maranatha Christian Academy
- Palm Valley Multiple Intelligence School
- Palma Elementary School
- Ponciano Alzona Elementary School
- Saint Paul Learning School
- San Agustin Elementary School
- San Andres Elementary School
- San Benito Elementary School
- San Ildefonso Elementary School
- San Miguel Elementary School
- San Roque Elementary School
- Santa Rosa Elementary School

=== Secondary schools ===
- Alaminos National High School
- Buenaventura E. Fandialan Memorial National High School
- Ibayiw Integrated National High School
- Laguna Senior High School
- Victoria Senior High School

=== Higher educational institution ===
- Marcelino Fule Memorial College

== Notable personalities ==
- Timoteo Ofrasio, S.J. – Filipino Jesuit priest, liturgist and lyricist. He is known for liturgical catholic songs produced under Jesuit Music Ministry such as "Paghahandog ng Sarili", "Isang Bansa", and "Panalangin sa Pagiging Bukas-Palad". This also includes "Alay sa Diyos" used during the 2015 papal visit to the Philippines.
- Ariella Arida – fashion model, television personality, Miss Universe-Philippines 2013, Miss Universe 2013 3rd Runner-up

== Gallery ==
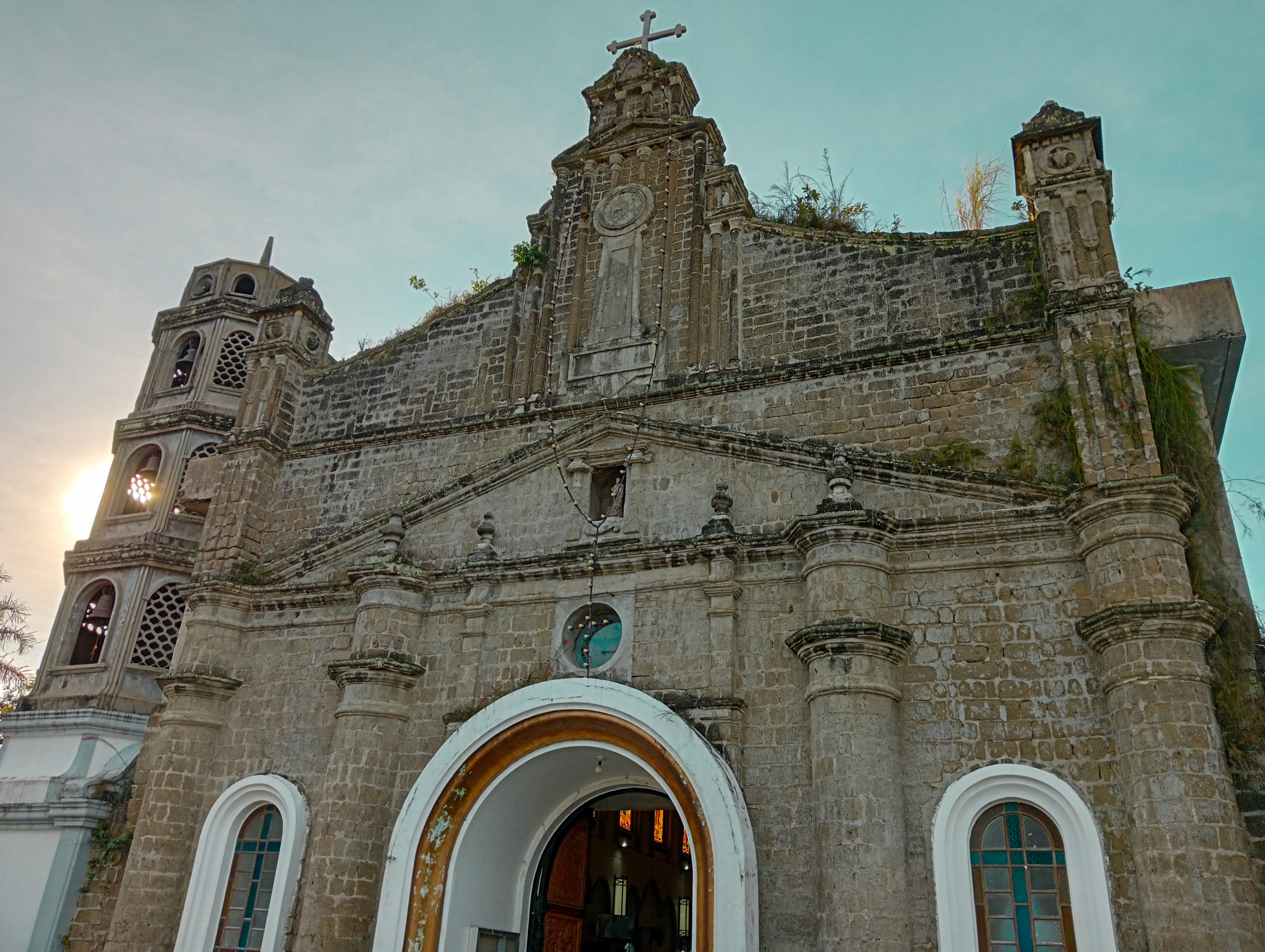
Alaminos Church

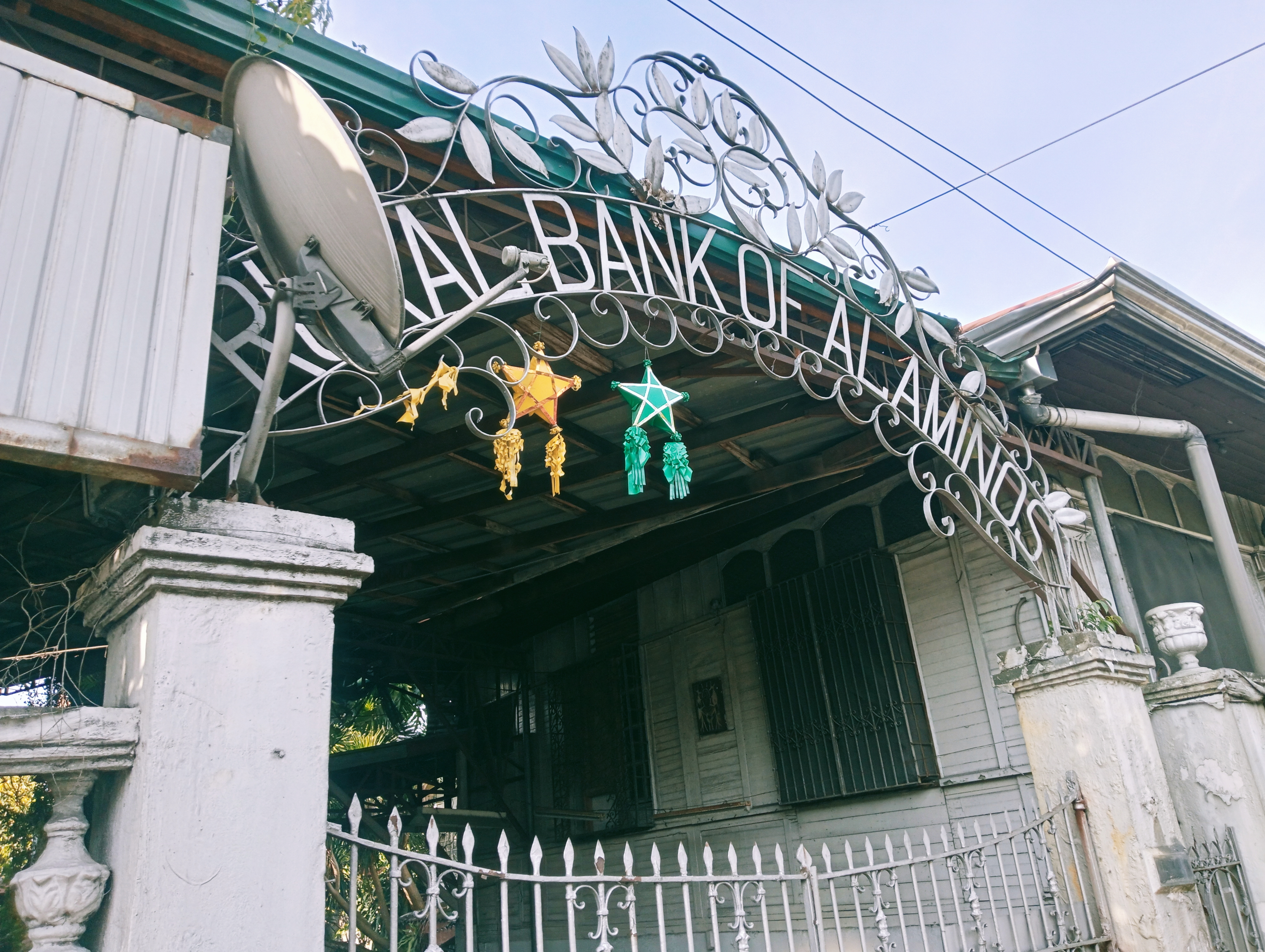
Rural Bank of Alaminos

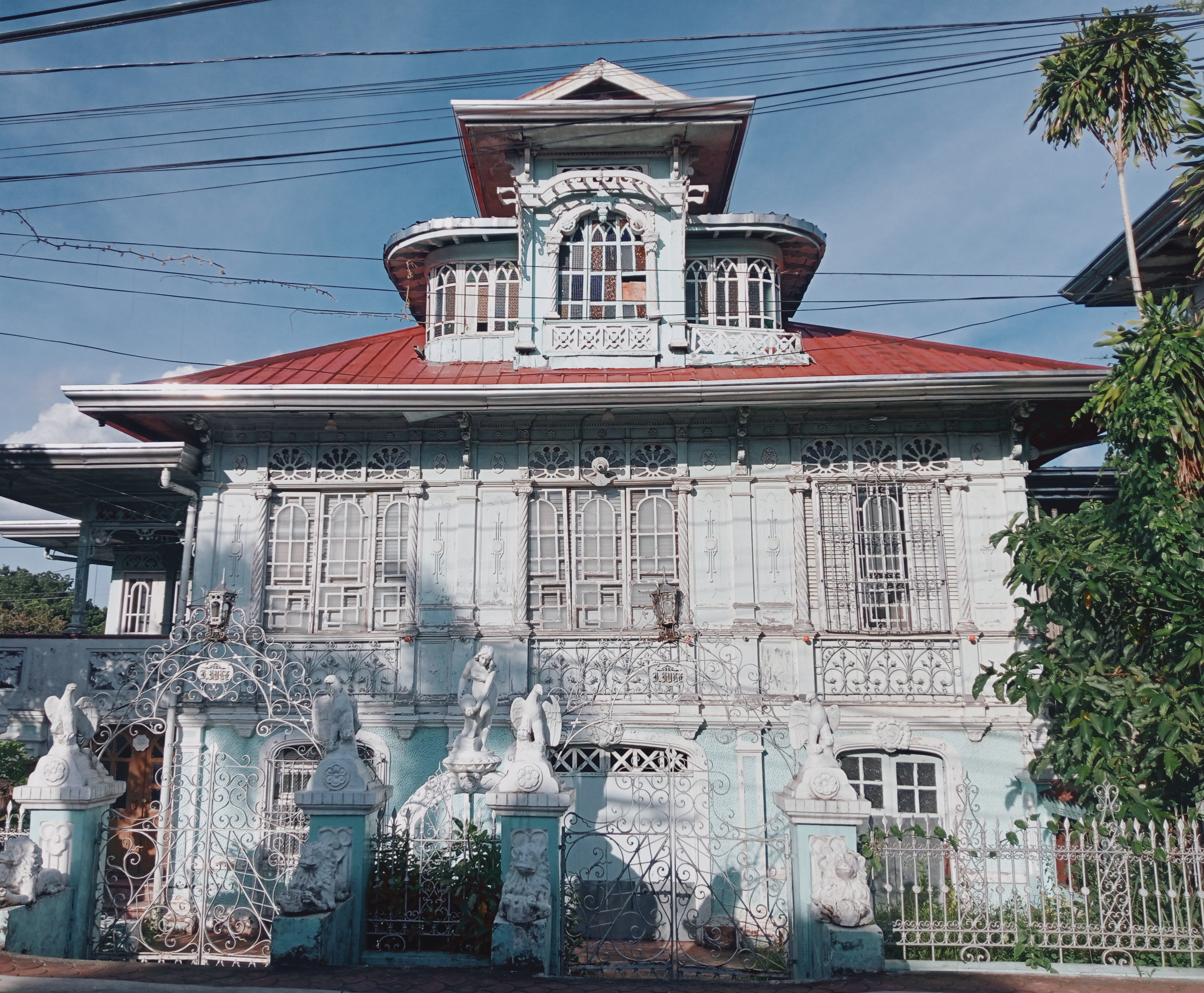
An ancestral house in Alaminos

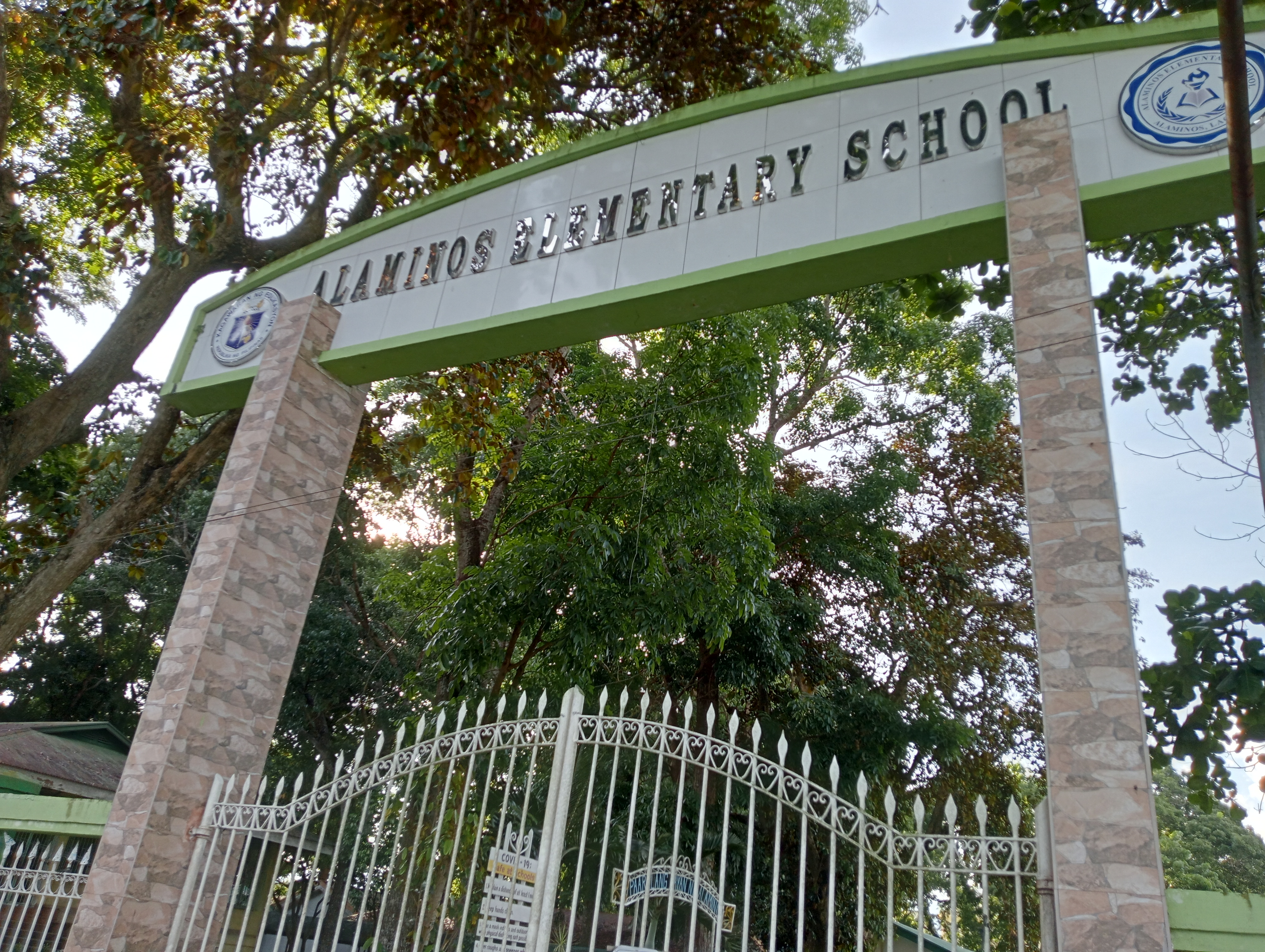
Alaminos Elementary School

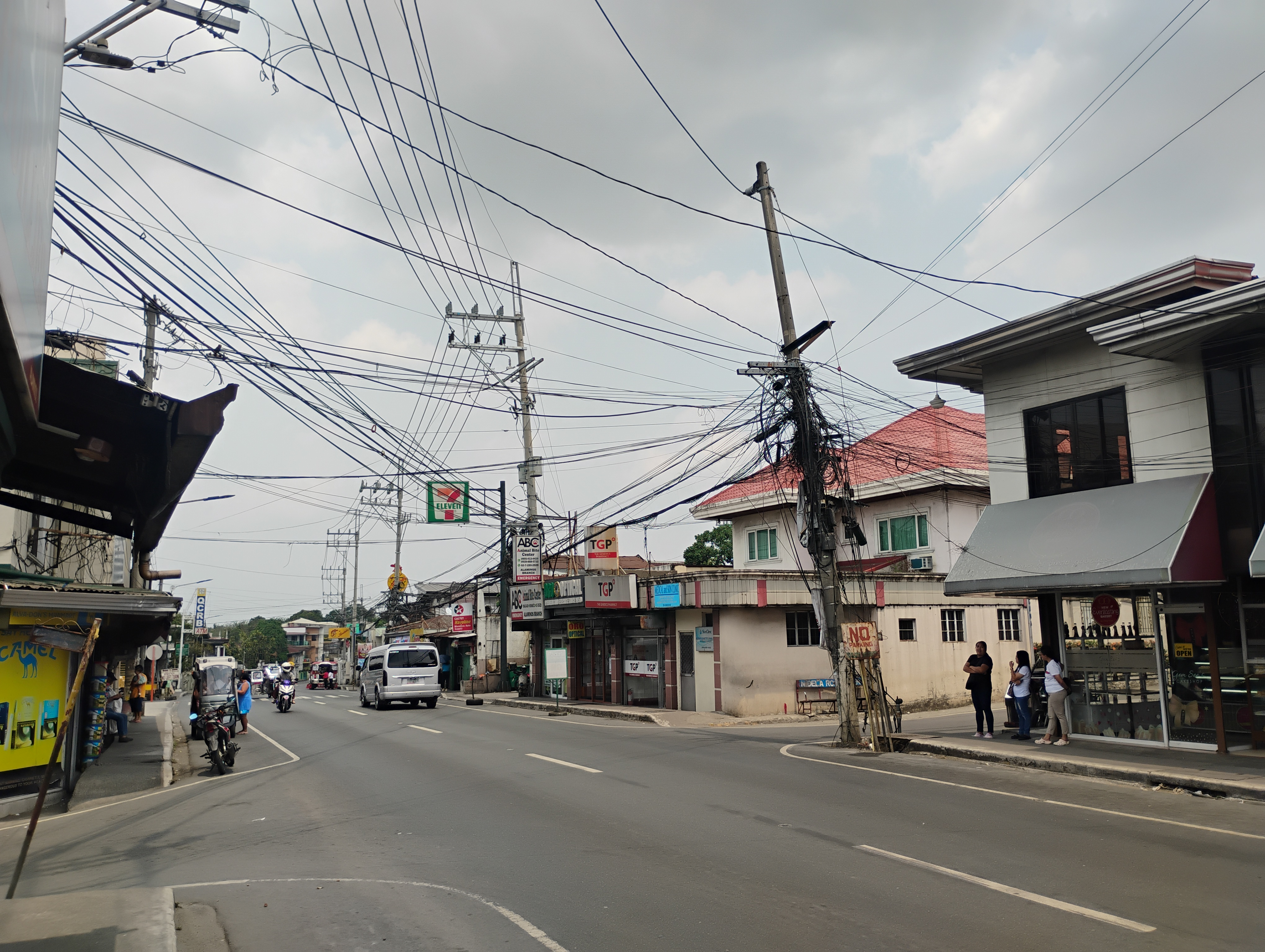
Pan-Philippine Highway through the poblacion
