= 2022 Philippine House of Representatives elections in Calabarzon =

- May 9, 2022
- All 31 Calabarzon seats in the House of Representatives
Party	Seats	+/–
NUP	8	+3
NPC	7	+3
PDP–Laban	6	−1
Nacionalista	5	−4
Lakas	3	+2
Liberal	1	0
Reporma	1	New
This lists parties that won seats. See the complete results below.

The 2022 Philippine House of Representatives elections in Calabarzon was held on May 9, 2022.

== Summary ==
Congressional district	Incumbent	Incumbent's party	Winner	Winner's party	Winning margin
Antipolo–1st	Roberto Puno	NUP	Roberto Puno	NUP	90.20%
Antipolo–2nd	Vacant		Romeo Acop	NUP	Unopposed
Batangas–1st	Eileen Ermita-Buhain	Nacionalista	Eric Buhain	Nacionalista	5.10%
Batangas–2nd	Raneo Abu	Nacionalista	Gerville Luistro	NPC	2.18%
Batangas–3rd	Maria Theresa Collantes	NPC	Maria Theresa Collantes	NPC	31.92%
Batangas–4th	Lianda Bolilia	Nacionalista	Lianda Bolilia	Nacionalista	46.12%
Batangas–5th	Marvey Mariño	Nacionalista	Marvey Mariño	Nacionalista	83.96%
Batangas–6th	Vilma Santos	Nacionalista	Ralph Recto	Nacionalista	Unopposed
Biñan	Len Alonte	PDP–Laban	Len Alonte	PDP–Laban	39.36%
Calamba	Jun Chipeco	Nacionalista	Cha Hernandez	PDP–Laban	3.28%
Cavite–1st	Francis Gerald Abaya	Liberal	Jolo Revilla	Lakas	4.62%
Cavite–2nd	Strike Revilla	Nacionalista	Lani Mercado	Lakas	76.78%
Cavite–3rd	Alex Advincula	NUP	AJ Advincula	NUP	Unopposed
Cavite–4th	Elpidio Barzaga Jr.	NUP	Elpidio Barzaga Jr.	NUP	79.72%
Cavite–5th	Dahlia Loyola	NPC	Roy Loyola	NPC	83.14%
Cavite–6th	Luis Ferrer IV	NUP	Antonio Ferrer	NUP	Unopposed
Cavite–7th	Jesus Crispin Remulla	NUP	Jesus Crispin Remulla	NUP	Unopposed
Cavite–8th	Abraham Tolentino	NUP	Aniela Tolentino	NUP	79.48%
Laguna–1st	Danilo Fernandez	NUP	Ann Matibag	PDP–Laban	11.64%
Laguna–2nd	Ruth Hernandez	PDP–Laban	Ruth Hernandez	PDP–Laban	28.06%
Laguna–3rd	Sol Aragones	Nacionalista	Loreto Amante	PDP–Laban	47.67%
Laguna–4th	Benjamin Agarao Jr.	PDP–Laban	Jam Agarao	PDP–Laban	0.08%
Quezon–1st	Mark Enverga	NPC	Mark Enverga	NPC	73.73%
Quezon–2nd	David C. Suarez	Nacionalista	David C. Suarez	Nacionalista	8.71%
Quezon–3rd	Aleta Suarez	Lakas	Reynante Arrogancia	Reporma	22.08%
Quezon–4th	Angelina Tan	NPC	Keith Micah Tan	NPC	53.07%
Rizal–1st	Jack Duavit	NPC	Jack Duavit	NPC	Unopposed
Rizal–2nd	Fidel Nograles	Lakas	Dino Tanjuatco	Liberal	62.16%
Rizal–3rd	New seat		Jose Arturo Garcia Jr.	NPC	13.12%
Rizal–4th	New seat		Fidel Nograles	Lakas	37.80%
Santa Rosa	New seat		Danilo Fernandez	NUP	28.18%

== Batangas ==
=== 1st district ===
Incumbent Eileen Ermita-Buhain of the Nacionalista Party was term-limited.

The Nacionalista Party nominated Ermita-Buhain's husband, former Bureau of Immigration executive director Eric Buhain, who won the election against his sister-in-law Lisa Ermita (Nationalist People's Coalition) and two other candidates.

Candidate	Party	Votes	%
Eric Buhain	Nacionalista Party	143,705	45.29
Lisa Ermita	Nationalist People's Coalition	127,545	40.19
Gerry Manalo	Partido Pilipino sa Pagbabago	42,233	13.31
Luisito Ruiz	Ang Kapatiran	3,839	1.21
Total		317,322	100.00
Valid votes		317,322	92.96
Invalid/blank votes		24,026	7.04
Total votes		341,906	–
Registered voters/turnout		393,786	86.83
Nacionalista hold			
Source: Commission on Elections

=== 2nd district ===
Incumbent Raneo Abu of the Nacionalista Party was term-limited.

The Nacionalista Party nominated Abu's daughter, Reina Abu, who was defeated by Mabini administrator Gerville Luistro of the Nationalist People's Coalition. Former Presidential Anti-Graft Commission commissioner Nick Conti (PDP–Laban) also ran for representative.

Candidate	Party	Votes	%
Gerville Luistro	Nationalist People's Coalition	71,832	43.21
Reina Abu	Nacionalista Party	68,208	41.03
Nick Conti	PDP–Laban	26,193	15.76
Total		166,233	100.00
Valid votes		166,233	97.30
Invalid/blank votes		4,615	2.70
Total votes		171,021	–
Registered voters/turnout		196,497	87.03
NPC gain from Nacionalista			
Source: Commission on Elections

=== 3rd district ===
Incumbent Maria Theresa Collantes of the Nationalist People's Coalition ran for a third term. She was previously affiliated with PDP–Laban.

Collantes won re-election against Tanauan mayor Mary Angeline Halili (Pederalismo ng Dugong Dakilang Samahan), Talisay mayor Gerry Natanauan (Independent) and Nestor Burgos (Independent).

Candidate	Party	Votes	%
Maria Theresa Collantes (incumbent)	Nationalist People's Coalition	224,710	60.93
Mary Angeline Halili	Pederalismo ng Dugong Dakilang Samahan	106,977	29.01
Gerry Natanauan	Independent	31,103	8.43
Nestor Burgos	Independent	5,981	1.62
Total		368,771	100.00
Valid votes		368,771	87.67
Invalid/blank votes		51,872	12.33
Total votes		421,081	–
Registered voters/turnout		478,027	88.09
NPC hold			
Source: Commission on Elections

=== 4th district ===
Incumbent Lianda Bolilia of the Nacionalista Party ran for a third term.

Bolilia won re-election against former Taysan mayor Dondon Portugal (Nationalist People's Coalition).

Candidate	Party	Votes	%
Lianda Bolilia (incumbent)	Nacionalista Party	184,163	73.06
Dondon Portugal	Nationalist People's Coalition	67,915	26.94
Total		252,078	100.00
Valid votes		252,078	92.84
Invalid/blank votes		19,436	7.16
Total votes		271,803	–
Registered voters/turnout		307,973	88.26
Nacionalista hold			
Source: Commission on Elections

=== 5th district ===
Incumbent Marvey Mariño of the Nacionalista Party ran for a third term.

Mariño won re-election against Calito Bisa (Ang Kapatiran).

Candidate	Party	Votes	%
Marvey Mariño (incumbent)	Nacionalista Party	156,530	91.98
Carlito Bisa	Ang Kapatiran	13,645	8.02
Total		170,175	100.00
Valid votes		170,175	87.63
Invalid/blank votes		24,026	12.37
Total votes		186,853	–
Registered voters/turnout		220,199	84.86
Nacionalista hold			
Source: Commission on Elections

=== 6th district ===
Incumbent Vilma Santos of the Nacionalista Party was retiring.

The Nacionalista Party nominated Santos' husband, Senator Ralph Recto, who won the election unopposed.

Candidate	Party	Votes	%
Ralph Recto	Nacionalista Party	161,540	100.00
Total		161,540	100.00
Valid votes		161,540	83.04
Invalid/blank votes		32,995	16.96
Total votes		194,712	–
Registered voters/turnout		222,589	87.48
Nacionalista hold			
Source: Commission on Elections

== Cavite ==
=== 1st district ===
Term-limited incumbent Francis Gerald Abaya of the Liberal Party ran for mayor of Kawit.

The Liberal Party nominated Abaya's brother, former Kawit vice mayor Paul Abaya, who was defeated by Cavite vice governor Jolo Revilla of Lakas–CMD.

Candidate	Party	Votes	%
Jolo Revilla	Lakas–CMD	102,259	52.31
Paul Abaya	Liberal Party	93,234	47.69
Total		195,493	100.00
Total votes		203,180	–
Registered voters/turnout		260,439	78.01
Lakas gain from Liberal			
Source: Commission on Elections

=== 2nd district ===
Incumbent Strike Revilla of the Nacionalista Party ran for mayor of Bacoor. He was previously affiliated with the National Unity Party.

Revilla endorsed his sister-in-law, Bacoor mayor Lani Mercado, who won the election against two other candidates.

Candidate	Party	Votes	%
Lani Mercado	Lakas–CMD	168,385	86.05
Jose Herminio Japson	Independent	18,142	9.27
George Abraham Ber Ado	Independent	9,158	4.68
Total		195,685	100.00
Total votes		233,429	–
Registered voters/turnout		294,496	79.26
Lakas gain from Nacionalista			
Source: Commission on Elections

=== 3rd district ===
Term-limited incumbent Alex Advincula of the National Unity Party (NUP) ran for mayor of Imus. He was previously affiliated with PDP–Laban.

The NUP nominated Advincula's son, Imus councilor AJ Advincula, who won the election unopposed.

Candidate	Party	Votes	%
AJ Advincula	National Unity Party	154,292	100.00
Total		154,292	100.00
Total votes		184,870	–
Registered voters/turnout		224,081	82.50
NUP hold			
Source: Commission on Elections

=== 4th district ===
Incumbent Elpidio Barzaga Jr. of the National Unity Party ran for a second term.

Barzaga won re-election against Osmond Calupad (Independent).

Candidate	Party	Votes	%
Elpidio Barzaga Jr. (incumbent)	National Unity Party	278,386	89.86
Osmond Calupad	Independent	31,421	10.14
Total		309,807	100.00
Total votes		336,817	–
Registered voters/turnout		400,074	84.19
NUP hold			
Source: Commission on Elections

=== 5th district ===
Incumbent Dahlia Loyola of the Nationalist People's Coalition (NPC) ran for mayor of Carmona.

The NPC nominated Loyola's husband, Carmona mayor Roy Loyola, who won the election against Rhenan de Castro (Partido Federal ng Pilipinas).

Candidate	Party	Votes	%
Roy Loyola	Nationalist People's Coalition	201,418	91.57
Rhenan de Castro	Partido Federal ng Pilipinas	18,540	8.43
Total		219,958	100.00
Total votes		248,854	–
Registered voters/turnout		298,625	83.33
NPC hold			
Source: Commission on Elections

=== 6th district ===
Term-limited incumbent Luis Ferrer IV of the National Unity Party (NUP) ran for mayor of General Trias.

The NUP nominated Ferrer's brother, General Trias mayor Antonio Ferrer, who won the election unopposed.

Candidate	Party	Votes	%
Antonio Ferrer	National Unity Party	118,371	100.00
Total		118,371	100.00
Total votes		141,035	–
Registered voters/turnout		193,284	72.97
NUP hold			
Source: Commission on Elections

=== 7th district ===
Incumbent Jesus Crispin Remulla of the National Unity Party won re-election for a second term unopposed. He was previously affiliated with the Nacionalista Party.

Candidate	Party	Votes	%
Jesus Crispin Remulla (incumbent)	National Unity Party	202,784	100.00
Total		202,784	100.00
Total votes		282,849	–
Registered voters/turnout		347,207	81.46
NUP hold			
Source: Commission on Elections

=== 8th district ===
Term-limited incumbent Abraham Tolentino of the National Unity Party (NUP) ran for mayor of Tagaytay. He was previously affiliated with PDP–Laban.

The NUP initially nominated Tolentino's wife, Tagaytay mayor Agnes Tolentino. However, Agnes later ran for vice mayor of Tagaytay and was substituted by her daughter, Aniela Tolentino, who won the election against Allan Par (Independent).

Candidate	Party	Votes	%
Aniela Tolentino	National Unity Party	166,077	89.74
Allan Par	Independent	18,995	10.26
Total		185,072	100.00
Total votes		240,885	–
Registered voters/turnout		284,147	84.77
NUP hold			
Source: Commission on Elections

== Laguna ==
=== 1st district ===
As a result of Laguna's redistricting in 2019, the city of Santa Rosa was separated from Laguna's 1st district to create its own district.

Incumbent Dan Fernandez of the National Unity Party ran for a second term in Santa Rosa's lone district. He was previously affiliated with PDP–Laban.

Provincial board member Ann Matibag (PDP–Laban) won the election against former provincial board member Dave Almarinez (Nacionalista Party) and four other candidates.

Candidate	Party	Votes	%
Ann Matibag	PDP–Laban	69,815	50.68
Dave Almarinez	Nacionalista Party	53,783	39.04
Dave Aldave	People's Reform Party	5,346	3.88
Kay Gilbuena	Liberal Party	4,028	2.92
Frank Alvarez Mercado	Independent	3,889	2.82
John Gilbuena	Independent	895	0.65
Total		137,756	100.00
Total votes		145,623	–
Registered voters/turnout		174,499	83.45
PDP–Laban gain from NUP			
Source: Commission on Elections

=== 2nd district ===
Incumbent Ruth Hernandez of PDP–Laban ran for a second term. She was previously an independent.

Hernandez won re-election against former Philippine Amusement and Gaming Corporation chairperson Efraim Genuino (Bigkis Pinoy).

Candidate	Party	Votes	%
Ruth Hernandez (incumbent)	PDP–Laban	168,368	64.03
Efraim Genuino	Bigkis Pinoy	94,571	35.97
Total		262,939	100.00
Total votes		282,217	–
Registered voters/turnout		351,176	80.36
PDP–Laban hold			
Source: Commission on Elections

=== 3rd district ===
Term-limited incumbent Sol Aragones of the Nacionalista Party ran for governor of Laguna.

Aragones endorsed provincial board member Angelica Jones of PROMDI, who was defeated by San Pablo mayor Loreto Amante of PDP–Laban. Two other candidates also ran for representative.

Candidate	Party	Votes	%
Loreto Amante	PDP–Laban	197,234	72.75
Angelica Jones	PROMDI	68,044	25.10
Kristy Villamor	Aksyon Demokratiko	3,778	1.39
Kingcong Mediano	Independent	2,053	0.76
Total		271,109	100.00
Total votes		298,826	–
Registered voters/turnout		343,966	86.88
PDP–Laban gain from Nacionalista			
Source: Commission on Elections

=== 4th district ===
Term-limited incumbent Benjamin Agarao Jr. of PDP–Laban ran for mayor of Santa Cruz.

PDP–Laban nominated Agarao's daughter, provincial board member Jam Agarao, who won the election against former Santa Maria mayor Tony Carolino (Aksyon Demokratiko).

Candidate	Party	Votes	%
Jam Agarao	PDP–Laban	153,495	50.04
Tony Carolino	Aksyon Demokratiko	153,267	49.96
Total		306,762	100.00
Total votes		325,776	–
Registered voters/turnout		397,665	81.92
PDP–Laban hold			
Source: Commission on Elections

On January 23, 2025, the House of Representatives Electoral Tribunal upheld Jam Agarao's election after a recount.

Candidate	Party	Votes	%
Jam Agarao	PDP–Laban	153,753	50.04
Tony Carolino	Aksyon Demokratiko	153,477	49.96
Total		307,230	100.00
Total votes		325,776	–
Registered voters/turnout		397,665	81.92
PDP–Laban hold			
Source: Commission on Elections, The Philippine Star

=== Biñan ===
Incumbent Len Alonte of PDP–Laban ran for a third term.

Alonte won re-election against Mike Yatco (Partido Federal ng Pilipinas).

Candidate	Party	Votes	%
Len Alonte (incumbent)	PDP–Laban	116,376	69.68
Mike Yatco	Partido Federal ng Pilipinas	50,627	30.32
Total		167,003	100.00
Total votes		176,525	–
Registered voters/turnout		223,491	78.99
PDP–Laban hold			
Source: Commission on Elections

=== Calamba ===
Incumbent Jun Chipeco of the Nacionalista Party was term-limited.

The Nacionalista Party nominated Calamba mayor Timmy Chipeco, who was defeated by city councilor Cha Hernandez of PDP–Laban. Emer Panganiban (Independent) also ran for representative.

Candidate	Party	Votes	%
Cha Hernandez	PDP–Laban	113,130	50.09
Timmy Chipeco	Nacionalista Party	105,723	46.81
Emer Panganiban	Independent	6,981	3.09
Total		225,834	100.00
Total votes		245,133	–
Registered voters/turnout		332,844	73.65
PDP–Laban gain from Nacionalista			
Source: Commission on Elections

=== Santa Rosa ===
As a result of Laguna's redistricting in 2019, a district was created for the city of Santa Rosa, which used to be under Laguna's 1st district.

Dan Fernandez of the National Unity Party, incumbent representative of Laguna's 1st district, won re-election for a second term against former city councilor Boy Factoriza (Kilusang Bagong Lipunan).

Candidate	Party	Votes	%
Dan Fernandez	National Unity Party	104,772	64.09
Boy Factoriza	Kilusang Bagong Lipunan	58,704	35.91
Total		163,476	100.00
Total votes		182,645	–
Registered voters/turnout		222,046	82.26
NUP gain			
Source: Commission on Elections

== Quezon ==
=== 1st district ===
Incumbent Mark Enverga of the Nationalist People's Coalition ran for a second term.

Enverga won re-election against four other candidates.

Candidate	Party	Votes	%
Mark Enverga (incumbent)	Nationalist People's Coalition	227,368	86.18
Techie Dator	Kilusang Bagong Lipunan	32,841	12.45
Francisco Rubio	Independent	2,614	0.99
Lamberto Cubilo	Independent	996	0.38
Total		263,819	100.00
Total votes		307,457	–
Registered voters/turnout		365,650	84.09
NPC hold			
Source: Commission on Elections

=== 2nd district ===
Incumbent David Suarez of the Nacionalista Party ran for a second term.

Suarez won re-election against former representative Proceso Alcala (Nationalist People's Coalition) and three other candidates.

Candidate	Party	Votes	%
David Suarez (incumbent)	Nacionalista Party	207,836	52.93
Proceso Alcala	Nationalist People's Coalition	173,639	44.22
Antonio Punzalan	Partido para sa Demokratikong Reporma	6,038	1.54
Abi Bagabaldo	Independent	3,129	0.80
Nebu Alejandrino	Independent	2,026	0.52
Total		392,668	100.00
Total votes		416,767	–
Registered voters/turnout		471,129	88.46
Nacionalista hold			
Source: Commission on Elections

=== 3rd district ===
Incumbent Aleta Suarez of Lakas–CMD ran for a second term.

Suarez was defeated by provincial board member Reynante Arrogancia (Partido para sa Demokratikong Reporma). Two other candidates also ran for representative.

Candidate	Party	Votes	%
Reynante Arrogancia	Partido para sa Demokratikong Reporma	122,379	58.47
Aleta Suarez (incumbent)	Lakas–CMD	76,174	36.39
Reynan Arogante	Workers' and Peasants' Party	7,794	3.72
Anna Suarez	People's Reform Party	2,966	1.42
Total		209,313	100.00
Total votes		246,406	–
Registered voters/turnout		290,045	84.95
Reporma gain from Lakas			
Source: Commission on Elections

=== 4th district ===
Term-limited incumbent Angelina Tan of the Nationalist People's Coalition (NPC) ran for governor of Quezon.

The NPC nominated Tan's son, Keith Micah Tan, who won the election against five other candidates.

Candidate	Party	Votes	%
Keith Micah Tan	Nationalist People's Coalition	166,591	72.89
Adhoray Tan	Lakas–CMD	43,862	19.19
Fer Martinez	National Unity Party	12,193	5.34
Dhoray Legaspi	Workers' and Peasants' Party	2,705	1.18
Jun Tierra	Independent	2,191	0.96
Andoy Martinez	People's Reform Party	1,003	0.44
Total		228,545	100.00
Total votes		250,876	–
Registered voters/turnout		297,199	84.41
NPC hold			
Source: Commission on Elections

== Rizal ==
=== 1st district ===
Incumbent Jack Duavit of the Nationalist People's Coalition won re-election for a third term unopposed.

Candidate	Party	Votes	%
Jack Duavit (incumbent)	Nationalist People's Coalition	308,707	100.00
Total		308,707	100.00
Valid votes		308,707	70.39
Invalid/blank votes		129,863	29.61
Total votes		439,138	–
Registered voters/turnout		521,954	84.13
NPC hold			
Source: Commission on Elections

=== 2nd district ===
As a result of Rizal's redistricting in 2021, the municipalities of Rodriguez and San Mateo were separated from the 2nd district to create their own districts.

Incumbent Fidel Nograles of Lakas–CMD ran for a second term in Rizal's 4th district. He was previously affiliated with PDP–Laban.

Provincial board member Dino Tanjuatco of the Liberal Party won the election against Omar Fajardo (PDP–Laban).

Candidate	Party	Votes	%
Dino Tanjuatco	Liberal Party	166,361	81.08
Omar Fajardo	PDP–Laban	38,816	18.92
Total		205,177	100.00
Total votes		246,308	–
Registered voters/turnout		297,030	82.92
Liberal gain from Lakas			
Source: Commission on Elections

=== 3rd district ===
As a result of Rizal's redistricting in 2021, the district was created with the municipality of San Mateo, which used to be under Rizal's 2nd district.

Former Metropolitan Manila Development Authority general manager Jose Arturo Garcia Jr. won the election against two other candidates.

Candidate	Party	Votes	%
Jose Arturo Garcia Jr.	Nationalist People's Coalition	48,640	53.33
Cristina Diaz	PDP–Laban	36,673	40.21
Maria Cristina Diaz	Aksyon Demokratiko	5,894	6.46
Total		91,207	100.00
Total votes		96,783	–
Registered voters/turnout		110,276	87.76
NPC gain			
Source: Commission on Elections

=== 4th district ===
As a result of Rizal's redistricting in 2021, the district was created with the municipality of Rodriguez, which used to be under Rizal's 2nd district.

Fidel Nograles of Lakas–CMD, incumbent representative of Rizal's 2nd district, won re-election for a second term against former Rizal's 2nd district representative Isidro Rodriguez Jr. (Nationalist People's Coalition) and Bonna Aquino (Partido Federal ng Pilipinas).

Candidate	Party	Votes	%
Fidel Nograles	Lakas–CMD	92,176	58.82
Isidro Rodriguez Jr.	Nationalist People's Coalition	32,995	21.05
Bonna Aquino	Partido Federal ng Pilipinas	31,550	20.13
Total		156,721	100.00
Total votes		166,481	–
Registered voters/turnout		201,452	82.64
Lakas gain			
Source: Commission on Elections

=== Antipolo's 1st district ===
Incumbent Roberto Puno of the National Unity Party ran for a second term.

Puno won re-election against two other candidates.

Candidate	Party	Votes	%
Roberto Puno (incumbent)	National Unity Party	132,007	93.87
Raldy Abaño	Independent	5,162	3.67
Jebs Tibio	Independent	3,460	2.46
Total		140,629	100.00
Total votes		163,397	–
Registered voters/turnout		215,070	75.97
NUP hold			
Source: Commission on Elections

=== Antipolo's 2nd district ===
The seat is vacant after Resurreccion Acop of the National Unity Party (NUP) died on May 28, 2021.

The NUP nominated Acop's widower, former representative Romeo Acop, who won the election unopposed.

Candidate	Party	Votes	%
Romeo Acop	National Unity Party	132,896	100.00
Total		132,896	100.00
Total votes		185,971	–
Registered voters/turnout		256,180	72.59
NUP hold			
Source: Commission on Elections
