= Philippine House Special Committee on Southern Tagalog Development =

Special committee of the House of Representatives of the Philippines

Special Committee on Southern Tagalog Development
- 20th Congress

History
- New session started: To convene on July 28, 2025

Leadership
- Chairman: Ramil Hernandez, Lakas since August 5, 2025
- Minority Leader: Iris Marie Montes, 4K since August 12, 2025

Website
- Special Committee on Southern Tagalog Development

The Philippine House Special Committee on Southern Tagalog Development is a special committee of the Philippine House of Representatives.

== Jurisdiction ==
As prescribed by House Rules, the committee's jurisdiction is on the development of the Southern Tagalog area inclusive of those affecting agricultural areas, tourism, economic and industrial estates and processing areas therein.

== Members, 20th Congress ==
As of June 30, 2025, all committee membership positions are vacant until the House convenes for its first regular session on July 28.

=== 19th Congress ===
Position	Members	Party	Province/City	District
Chairperson	Ramil Hernandez	Lakas	Laguna	2nd
Vice Chairpersons	Roy Gonzales	Lakas	Santa Rosa	Lone
Vice Chairpersons	Nicanor Briones	Agap	Party-list	
Vice Chairpersons	Edwin Gardiola	CSW	Party-list	
Vice Chairpersons	Ramon Jolo Revilla III	Lakas	Cavite	1st
Vice Chairpersons	Ramil Hernandez	Lakas	Laguna	2nd
Members for the Majority	Lani Mercado-Revilla	Lakas	Cavite	2nd
Members for the Majority	Charisse Anne Hernandez	Lakas–CMD	Calamba	Lone
Members for the Majority	Loreto Amante	Lakas	Laguna	3rd
Members for the Majority	Ma. Rene Ann Matibag	Lakas	Laguna	1st
Members for the Majority	Walfredo Dimaguila Jr.	Lakas	Biñan	Lone
Members for the Minority	Iris Marie Montes	4K	Party-list	

== Historical membership rosters ==
=== 18th Congress ===
Position	Members	Party	Province/City	District
Chairperson	Elenita Milagros Ermita-Buhain	Nacionalista	Batangas	1st
Vice Chairpersons	Luis Ferrer IV	NUP	Cavite	6th
Vice Chairpersons	Ruth Mariano-Hernandez	PDP-Laban	Laguna	2nd
Vice Chairpersons	Mario Vittorio Mariño	Nacionalista	Batangas	5th
Members for the Majority	Sol Aragones	Nacionalista	Laguna	3rd
Members for the Majority	Joaquin Chipeco Jr.	Nacionalista	Calamba	Lone
Members for the Majority	David Suarez	Nacionalista	Quezon	2nd
Members for the Majority	Angelina Tan	NPC	Quezon	4th
Members for the Majority	Michael John Duavit	NPC	Rizal	1st
Members for the Majority	Dahlia Loyola	NPC	Cavite	5th
Members for the Majority	Aleta Suarez	Lakas	Quezon	3rd
Members for the Majority	Juan Fidel Felipe Nograles	Lakas	Rizal	2nd
Members for the Minority	Alex Advincula	NUP	Cavite	3rd
Members for the Minority	Irene Gay Saulog	KALINGA	Party-list	

=== 19th Congress ===
Position	Members	Party	Province/City	District
Chairperson	Ruth Mariano-Hernandez	PDP–Laban	Laguna	2nd
Vice Chairpersons	Eric Buhain	Nacionalista	Batangas	1st
Vice Chairpersons	Emigdio Tanjuatco III	Liberal	Rizal	2nd
Vice Chairpersons	Crispin Diego Remulla	NUP	Cavite	7th
Members for the Majority	Antonino Calixto	PDP–Laban	Pasay	Lone
Members for the Majority	Charisse Anne Hernandez	Lakas–CMD	Calamba	Lone
Members for the Majority	Lani Mercado-Revilla	Lakas	Cavite	2nd
Members for the Majority	Keith Micah Tan	NPC	Quezon	4th
Members for the Majority	Juan Fidel Felipe Nograles	Lakas–CMD	Rizal	4th
Members for the Majority	Ramon Jolo Revilla III	Lakas–CMD	Cavite	1st
Members for the Minority	Ramon Rodrigo Gutierrez	1-Rider	Party-list	

== See also ==
- House of Representatives of the Philippines
- List of Philippine House of Representatives committees
