= 2007 Calamba local elections =

Local elections in Calamba, Laguna, Philippines

2007 Calamba City local elections
- May 14, 2007
- Mayoral election
Candidate	Joaquin Chipeco, Jr.	Moises Morales
Party	KAMPI	UNO
Running mate	Pursino Oruga
Popular vote	72,147	43,329
Percentage	62.48%	37.52%
Mayor before election
Joaquin Chipeco, Jr.
Elected mayor
Joaquin Chipeco, Jr.
KAMPI
- Vice mayoral election
Candidate	Pursino Oruga	Edgardo Catindig
Party	KAMPI	PDP–Laban
Popular vote	62,554	41,893
Percentage	56.01	37.51
Vice Mayor before election
Pursink Oruga
Lakas–CMD
Elected Vice Mayor
Pursino Oruga
KAMPI
- City Council election

10 of 12 seats in the Calamba City Council 7 seats needed for a majority
	First party	Second party	Third party
Party	Lakas	Independent	KAMPI
Seats won	7	2	0
Popular vote	386,498	133,964	109,032
Percentage	46.89%	16.57%	13.49%
	Fourth party	Fifth party	Sixth party
Party	PDP–Laban	Liberal	UNO
Seats won	1	0	0
Popular vote	96,790	63,919	34,003
Percentage	11.97%	7.91%	4.21%

Local elections were held in Calamba, Laguna, on May 14, 2007, within the Philippine general election, for posts of the mayor, vice mayor and ten councillors.

== Results ==
The political party Kabalikat ng Malayang Pilipino (KAMPI) won the Mayoral and Vice Mayoral posts against United Opposition (UNO), PDP-Laban, and the Liberal Party (LP).

=== Mayoral election ===
Incumbent Jun Chipeco is running for second term under the political party Kabalikat ng Malayang Pilipino (KAMPI). His opponent is Former Councilor Moises Morales under the party United Opposition.

Calamba City mayoralty election
Party	Candidate	Votes	%
KAMPI	Joaquin Chipeco, Jr.	72,147	62.48%
UNO	Moises Morales	43,329	37.52%
Total votes		115,476	100.00

=== Vice mayoral election ===
Incumbent Pursino Oruga is running for second term under the political party Kabalikat ng Malayang Pilipino (KAMPI). His opponents are incumbent councilor Edgardo Catindig (under PDP-Laban) and Rolando Baliao.

Calamba City vice mayoralty election
Party	Candidate	Votes	%
KAMPI	Pursino Oruga	62,554	56.01%
PDP–Laban	Edgardo Catindig	41,893	37.51%
Liberal	Rolando Baliao	7,240	6.48%
Total votes		111,687	100.00

=== City Council elections ===
Voters elected twelve councilors to comprise the City Council or the Sangguniang Panlungsod. With four of them Incumbent, Lakas got 7 seats, Independent got 2 seats, and PDP-Laban got 1 seat.

Party	Votes	%	Seats
Lakas	386,495	46.89	7
Independent	133,964	16.25	2
KAMPI	109,032	13.23	0
PDP–Laban	96,790	11.74	1
Liberal	63,919	7.76	0
UNO	34,003	4.13	0
Ex officio seats			2
Total	824,203	100.00	12

2007 Calamba City Council election
Party	Candidate	Votes	%
Lakas	Dyan Espiridion (incumbent)	64,544	7.83%
PDP–Laban	Ruth Mariano-Hernandez	56,986	6.91%
Lakas	Luis Vergel Baroro	55,420	6.72%
Independent	Leeanne Aldabe	54,094	6.56%
Lakas	Eduardo Silva (incumbent)	51,719	6.28%
Lakas	Dennis Lanzanas (incumbent)	46,615	5.9%
Lakas	Pocholo Platon (incumbent)	41,527	5.04%
Lakas	Jose Morel Manaig	39,283	4.77%
Lakas	Jose Pradas	37,535	4.55%
Independent	Christian Niño Lajara	34,083	4.14%
UNO	Santiago Atienza (incumbent)	34,003	4.13%
Lakas	Juan Lazaro (incumbent)	35,969	4.36%
KAMPI	Francis Terrenal	31,390	3.81%
KAMPI	Feliciano Masongsong	29,696	3.6%
KAMPI	Rodel Manalo	24,065	2.92%
PDP–Laban	Maria Virginia Alcasid	20,506	2.49%
Independent	Senador Alcalde	19,496	2.37%
KAMPI	Kerwin Piamonte	18,390	2.23%
Lakas	Juliana Mamalayan	15,883	1.93%
Liberal	Daniel Erasga	10,401	1.26%
Independent	Ricardo Mamino	10,079	1.22%
PDP–Laban	Erick Elepaño	10,055	1.22%
Liberal	Ernesto Canicosa	9,874	1.2%
PDP–Laban	Henry Crisostomo	9,243	1.12%
Liberal	Sotero Pamplona	9,110	1.11%
Liberal	Rino Magpantay	8,965	1.09%
Independent	Brando Dedicatoria	6,351	0.77%
Liberal	Erlene Almario	6,084	0.74%
Liberal	Narciso Paner, Jr.	5,699	0.69%
KAMPI	Guillermo Belarmino, Jr.	5,491	0.67%
Liberal	Marino Barit	3,965	0.48%
Liberal	Emilia Quiogue	3,530	0.43%
Liberal	Bayani Cuerdo	3,349	1.13%
Liberal	Gerardo Gotengco	2,942	0.36%
Independent	Edgardo Sacopla	2,708	0.33%
Independent	Felina Tenedero	2,258	0.27%
Independent	Jose Busayong	2,141	0.26%
Independent	Eliseo Arante	1,405	0.17%
Independent	Rowan Salgado	1,349	0.16%
Total votes		824,203	100%
