= 2022 Calamba local elections =

Philippine election

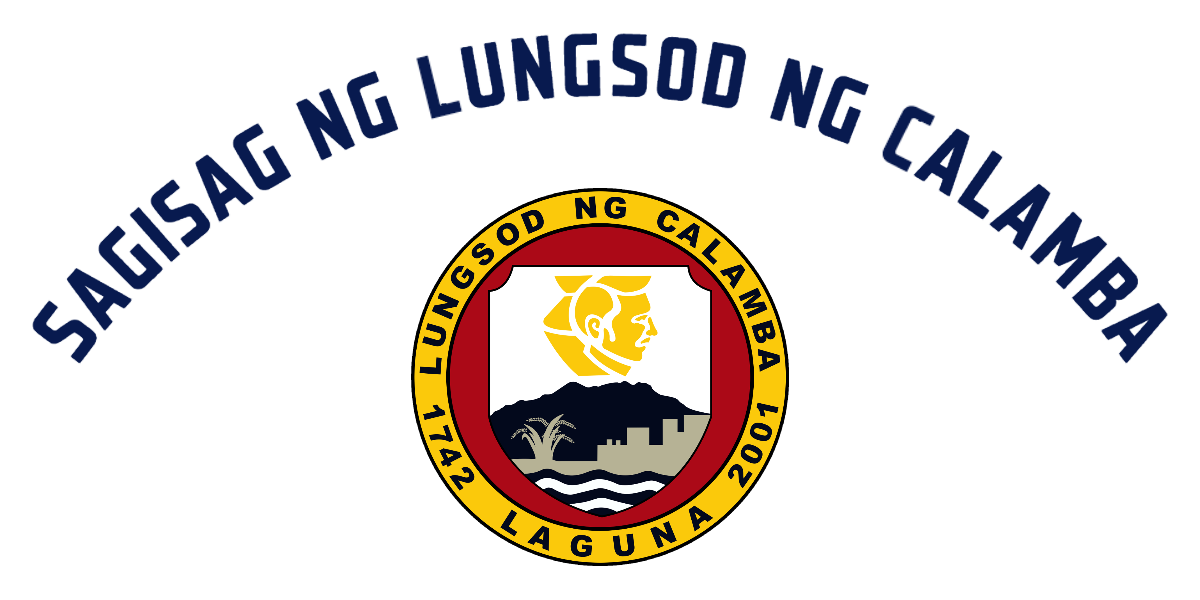
← 2019	May 9, 2022	2025 →
- Turnout: 73.65% ▲10.77 pp
- Mayoral election
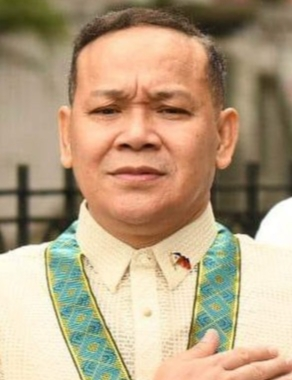

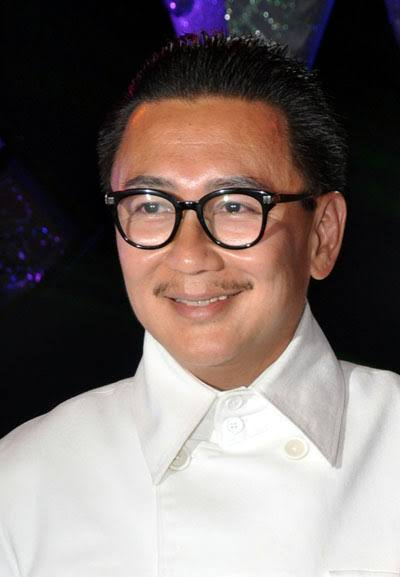
Candidate	Roseller Rizal	Julian Eugene Chipeco	Emilio Ramon Ejercito III
Party	PDP–Laban	Nacionalista	PFP
Alliance	CalamBAGO	Team One Calamba	Bagong Calamba
Running mate	Angelito Lazaro Jr.	Soliman Lajara
Popular vote	116,777	78,325	41,149
Percentage	47.64%	31.95%	16.79%
Mayor before election
Justin Marc Chipeco
Nacionalista
Elected mayor
Roseller Rizal
PDP–Laban
- Vice mayoral election
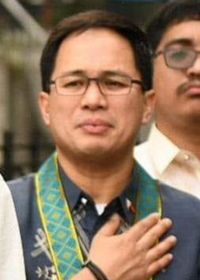

Candidate	Angelito Lazaro Jr.	Soliman Lajara
Party	PDP–Laban	Nacionalista
Alliance	CalamBAGO	Team One Calamba
Popular vote	126,445	100,115
Percentage	51.63	40.84
Vice Mayor before election
Roseller Rizal
Nacionalista
Elected Vice Mayor
Angelito Lazaro Jr.
PDP–Laban
- City Council election

12 of 14 seats in the Calamba City Council 8 seats needed for a majority
	First party	Second party	Third party
Party	Nacionalista	PDP–Laban	Independent
Alliance	Team One Calamba	CalamBAGO
Seats won	10	2	0
Popular vote	1,256,046	527,706	252,272
Percentage	61.33%	25.77%	12.32%
	Fourth party
Party	Liberal
Seats won	0
Popular vote	12,003
Percentage	0.59%

Local elections were held in Calamba, Laguna, on May 9, 2022, within the Philippine general election, for posts of the mayor, vice mayor and twelve councilors. They will also elect their representative of their lone congressional district. 245,133 of 332,844 registered voters voted in this election.

== Overview ==
Incumbent Mayor Justin Marc Chipeco is term-limited and will run for district representative. His brother, Councilor Julian Eugene Chipeco is seeking for a mayoral seat. His opponents are Vice Mayor Roseller Rizal and former Laguna Governor Emilio Ramon Ejercito.

== Candidates ==
=== Team One Calamba ===
#	Name	Party
For House of Representatives
1.	Justin Marc "Timmy" Chipeco	Nacionalista
For Mayor
1.	Julian Eugene "Joey" SB. Chipeco	Nacionalista
For Vice Mayor
1.	Soliman "Rajay" Lajara	Nacionalista
For Councilors
2.	Leeanne Aldabe-Cortez	Nacionalista
4.	Santiago Atienza	Nacionalista
8.	Doreen May Cabrera	Nacionalista
11.	Joselito Catindig	Nacionalista
15.	Kenneth Delas Llagas	Nacionalista
21.	Dyan Espiridion	Nacionalista
25.	Saturnino Lajara	Nacionalista
26.	Juan Lazaro	Nacionalista
28.	Arvin Manguiat	Nacionalista
30.	Moises Morales	Nacionalista
32.	Edison Natividad	Nacionalista
33.	Pursino Oruga	Nacionalista

=== Team CalamBAGO ===
#	Name	Party
For House of Representatives
2.	Charisse Anne "Cha" Hernandez	PDP–Laban
For Mayor
3.	Roseller "Ross" Rizal	PDP–Laban
For Vice Mayor
2.	Angelito "Totie" Lazaro Jr.	PDP–Laban
For Councilors
12.	Henry Crisostomo	PDP–Laban
13.	Roberto Cubio	PDP–Laban
16.	Ronnie Dimaranan	PDP–Laban
17.	Eugenia Dimayuga-Oña	PDP–Laban
19.	Ibarra Francisco Encarnacion	PDP–Laban
20.	Bryan Ercia	PDP–Laban
22.	Rhyan Francia	PDP–Laban
23.	Edward Gotengco	PDP–Laban
34.	Carizza Janine Panaligan	PDP–Laban
36.	Maria Kathrina Silva	PDP–Laban
38.	Gerard Teruel	PDP–Laban

=== Liberal Party ===
#	Name	Party
For Councilor
14.	Rey Dalde	Liberal

=== Partido Federal ng Pilipinas ===
#	Name	Party
For Mayor
2.	ER Ejercito	PFP

=== Independents ===
#	Name	Party
For House of Representatives
3.	Emerson Panganiban	Independent
For Councilors
1.	Maricris Amor Monterey	Independent
3.	George Bryan Arrieta	Independent
5.	Luis Vergel Baroro	Independent
6.	Rommel Benito	Independent
7.	Vernadeth Bernas	Independent
9.	Edwin Cadacio	Independent
10.	Shirley Caraan	Independent
18.	Dominador Dominguez	Independent
24.	Alvin Hizon	Independent
27.	Victor Jose Mandanas	Independent
29.	Eufrocino Maunahan	Independent
31.	Allan Motas	Independent
35.	Manuel Pelino Jr.	Independent
37.	Bernan "Dino" Tagapan	Independent
39.	Roel Torres	Independent

== Results ==
The candidates for mayor and vice mayor with the highest number of votes will win. Candidates who are incumbent in the position they are running are in italic text.

=== Mayoral election ===
Incumbent Timmy Chipeco is term-limited and is running for congressman. His brother, incumbent councilor Joey Chipeco is his party's nominee. His opponents are former governor ER Ejercito and incumbent Vice Mayor Roseller Rizal.

Calamba mayoralty election
Party	Candidate	Votes	%
PDP–Laban	Roseller "Ross" Rizal	116,777	47.64%
Nacionalista	Julian Eugene "Joey" SB. Chipeco	78,325	31.95%
PFP	Emilio Ramon Ejercito III	41,149	16.79%
Margin of victory		38,452	15.68
Invalid or blank votes		8,882	3.62
Total votes		245,133	100.00
PDP–Laban gain from Nacionalista			

==== Results by Baranggay ====
Barangay	Rizal		Chipeco		Ejercito	
Barangay	Votes	%	Votes	%	Votes	%
Bagong Kalsada	871	48.36	722	40.09	208	11.55
Bañadero	2,438	50.26	1,519	31.31	894	18.43
Banlic	4,322	53.51	2,443	30.25	1,312	16.24
Barandal	3,256	60.63	1,320	24.58	794	14.79
Barangay 1 (Poblacion)	1,920	44.88	1,514	35.39	844	19.73
Barangay 2 (Poblacion)	1,474	32.54	2,202	48.61	854	18.85
Barangay 3 (Poblacion)	1,471	49.90	1,095	37.14	382	12.96
Barangay 4 (Poblacion)	1,189	66.88	757	32.52	214	0.60
Barangay 5 (Poblacion)	2,065	57.79	1,110	31.07	398	11.14
Barangay 6 (Poblacion)	818	49.94	580	35.41	240	14.65
Barangay 7 (Poblacion)	805	46.53	755	43.64	170	9.83
Batino	771	76.11	158	15.6	84	8.29
Bubuyan	843	56.20	467	31.13	190	12.67
Bucal	3,413	56.26	1,443	23.78	1,211	19.96
Bunggo	1,007	42.74	1,047	44.44	302	12.82
Burol	700	49.86	611	43.52	93	6.62
Camaligan	194	15.71	535	68.15	56	7.13
Canlubang	13,849	50.71	9,244	33.85	4,215	15.44
Halang	2,320	51.49	1,478	32.80	708	15.71
Hornalan	315	29.92	703	66.76	35	3.32
Kay-Anlog	2,609	32.90	3,220	40.60	2,102	26.50
La Mesa	4,152	55.82	1,943	26.12	1,343	18.06
Laguerta	962	42.34	980	43.13	320	14.48
Lawa	2,099	49.05	1,167	27.27	1,013	23.67
Lecheria	2,297	48.59	1,684	35.63	746	15.78
Lingga	1,928	55.29	1,202	34.47	356	10.21
Looc	5,305	52.82	2,969	29.56	1,771	17.63
Mabato	127	25.81	363	73.78	2	0.41
Majada Labas	2,180	56.17	1,115	28.73	586	15.10
Makiling	1,925	39.28	1,794	36.60	1,182	24.12
Mapagong	1,390	46.61	974	32.66	618	20.72
Masili	1,088	54.76	485	24.41	414	20.84
Maunong	845	50.21	721	42.84	117	6.95
Mayapa	6,436	53.41	3,259	27.04	2,356	19.55
Milagrosa	1,599	45.39	1,355	38.46	569	16.15
Paciano Rizal	4,107	57.44	1,917	26.81	1,126	15.75
Palingon	1,810	54.44	1,137	34.20	378	11.37
Palo-Alto	3,913	54.11	1,767	24.43	1,552	21.46
Pansol	2,197	47.26	1,869	34.79	1,307	24.33
Parian	4,694	40.89	3,317	33.40	1,921	19.34
Prinza	954	49.10	798	41.07	191	9.83
Punta	1,203	49.57	927	38.20	297	12.24
Puting Lupa	277	22.28	891	71.68	75	6.03
Real	3,641	45.93	1,784	22.51	2,502	31.56
Saimsim	1,555	53.33	958	32.85	403	13.82
Sampiruhan	2,484	48.63	1,537	30.09	1,087	21.28
San Cristobal	2,679	51.22	1,570	30.02	981	18.76
San Jose	1,105	44.68	1,195	48.32	173	7.00
San Juan	1,316	51.67	927	36.40	304	11.94
Sirang Lupa	2,822	55.24	1,461	28.60	826	16.17
Sucol	1,214	46.16	906	34.45	510	19.39
Turbina	835	30.70	1,202	44.19	683	25.11
Ulango	203	31.18	429	65.90	19	2.92
Uwisan	785	46.48	799	47.31	105	6.22
Total votes	116,777	49.43	78,325	33.15	41,149	17.42

=== Vice mayoral election ===
Incumbent Roseller Rizal is term-limited and is running for mayor. His party nominated incumbent councilor Angelito Lazaro, Jr. His opponent is incumbent councilor Soliman Rajay Lajara.

Calamba vice mayoralty election
Party	Candidate	Votes	%
PDP–Laban	Angelito "Totie" Lazaro, Jr.	126,445	51.63%
Nacionalista	Soliman "Rajay" Lajara	100,115	40.84%
Margin of victory		26,330	10.74
Invalid or blank votes		18,573	7.58
Total votes		245,133	100.00
PDP–Laban hold			

=== Congressional election ===
Incumbent Joaquin Chipeco, Jr. is term-limited. His son, incumbent Mayor Justin Marc Chipeco is his party's nominee. His opponents are incumbent Councilor Charisse Anne Hernandez and Emerson Panganiban. Hernandez is Chipeco's former ally.

2022 Philippine House of Representatives election in the Calamba's lone district
Party	Candidate	Votes	%
PDP–Laban	Charisse Anne "Cha" Hernandez	113,130	46.15%
Nacionalista	Justin Marc "Timmy" Chipeco	105,723	43.13%
Independent	Emerson "Emer" Panganiban	6,981	2.85%
Margin of victory		7,407	3.01
Invalid or blank votes		19,299	7.84
Total votes		245,133	100.00
PDP–Laban gain from Nacionalista			

=== City Council elections ===
Voters will elect twelve councilors to comprise the City Council or the Sangguniang Panlungsod.

Among the candidates, seven are incumbent councilors and are seeking for reelection. Three of the candidates are former councilors (Santiago Atienza, Luis Vergel Baroro, and Moises Morales). Incumbent councilors Julian Eugene Chipeco, Charisse Anne Hernandez and Angelito Lazaro will run as mayor, congressman and vice mayor respectively.

Party	Votes	%	Seats
Nacionalista Party	1,256,046	61.33	10
PDP–Laban	527,706	25.77	2
Independent	252,272	12.32	0
Liberal Party	12,003	0.59	0
Ex officio seats			2
Total	2,048,027	100.00	14

2022 Calamba City Council election
Party	Candidate	Votes	%
Nacionalista	Joselito"Jojo" Catindig (incumbent)	136,533	6.67%
Nacionalista	Saturnino "Turne" Lajara (incumbent)	126,214	6.16%
Nacionalista	Leeanne "Lian" Aldabe-Cortez (incumbent)	122,803	6%
Nacionalista	Dyan Espiridion (incumbent)	115,942	5.66%
Nacionalista	Juan "Johnny" Lazaro (incumbent)	108,160	5.28%
Nacionalista	Pursino "Pursing" Oruga (incumbent)	107,489	5.25%
Nacionalista	Moises Morales	107,321	5.24%
Nacionalista	Doreen May Cabrera (incumbent)	106,284	5.19%
PDP–Laban	Gerard Teruel	101,292	4.95%
Nacionalista	Arvin Manguiat	98,384	4.8%
Nacionalista	Edison Natividad	86,784	4.24%
PDP–Laban	Maria Kathrina "Kath" Silva	83,029	4.05%
Nacionalista	Santiago "Santy" Atienza	79,913	3.9%
Nacionalista	Kenneth Delas Llagas	60,219	2.94%
PDP–Laban	Bryan Ercia	53,510	2.61%
Independent	Maricris Amor "Kriz Alcasid" Monterey	52,611	2.57%
PDP–Laban	Eugenia "Lod" Dimayuga-Oña	50,934	2.49%
PDP–Laban	Ronnie "Panhero" Dimaranan	48,628	2.37%
Independent	Luis Vergel "Bong" Baroro	44,056	2.15%
PDP–Laban	Ibarra Francisco "Bars" Encarnacion	40,102	1.96%
PDP–Laban	Carizza Janine "CJ" Panaligan	36,182	1.77%
PDP–Laban	Roberto "Bert" Cubio	32,408	1.58%
PDP–Laban	Henry Crisostomo	28,937	1.41%
Independent	Alvin Hizon	28,297	1.38%
PDP–Laban	Rhyan Francia	27,655	1.35%
PDP–Laban	Edward Gotengco	25,029	1.22%
Independent	Eufrocino "Ching" Maunahan	19,343	0.94%
Independent	Vernadeth Bernas	18,641	0.91%
Independent	Roel Torres	16,027	0.78%
Independent	Shirley Caraan	14,778	0.72%
Liberal	Rey Dalde	12,003	0.59%
Independent	Dominador Dominguez	10,119	0.05%
Independent	Rommel Benito	9,309	0.45%
Independent	Bernan "Dino" Tagapan	8,811	0.43%
Independent	Victor Jose "Vhie-jay" Mandanas	7,917	0.39%
Independent	Allan Motas	7,731	0.38%
Independent	Edwin "Nognog" Cadacio	5,446	0.27%
Independent	George Bryan Arietta	5,354	0.26%
Independent	Manuel Pelino, Jr.	3,832	0.19%
Total votes		2,048,027	100%
