= 2019 Laguna local elections =

Philippine election

Laguna local elections, 2019
- May 13, 2019
- Registered: 1,903,107
- Turnout: 70.52%
- Gubernatorial election
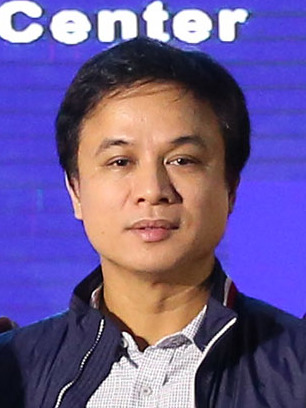

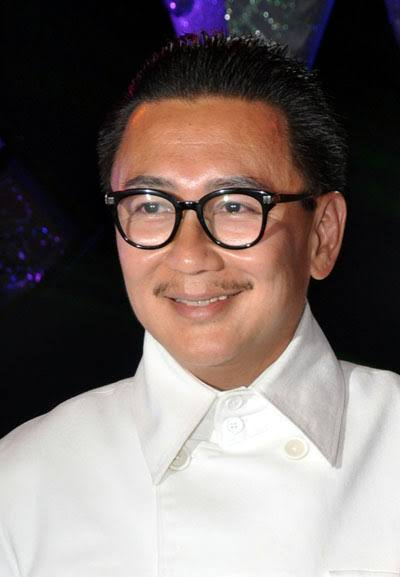
| Nominee | Ramil L. Hernandez | E.R. Ejercito |
| Party | PDP–Laban | PFP |
| Running mate | Katherine Agapay |
| Popular vote | 817,250 | 391,270 |
| Percentage | 66.55 | 31.86 |
- Vice gubernatorial election
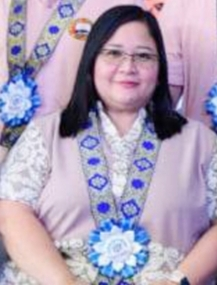

| Nominee | Katherine Agapay | Mateo San Sebastian |
| Party | PDP–Laban | Independent |
| Popular vote | 930,387 | 103,981 |
| Percentage | 89.95 | 10.05 |
- Results per city and municipality Hernandez: 50–60% 60–70% 70-80% 80–90% E.R.: 50-60% 60-70% 70-80% 80-90%
Governor before election
Ramil L. Hernandez
PDP–Laban
Elected Governor
Ramil L. Hernandez
PDP–Laban

Local elections were held in the Province of Laguna on May 13, 2019 as part of the 2019 Philippine general election. Voters selected candidates for all local positions: a town mayor, vice mayor and town council, as well as members of the Sangguniang Panlalawigan, the vice-governor, governor and representatives for the four districts of Laguna, including Biñan lone district and the newly created Calamba lone district.

== Provincial election ==
=== Candidates ===
Team Hernandez Agapay
| # | Name | Party | Result |
Vice Governor
| Re-Elect | Ramil Hernandez | PDP–Laban | Won |
For Vice Governor
| Re-Elect | Atty. Karen Agapay | PDP–Laban | Won |
1st District
For House Of Representative
| Vote! | Dan Fernandez | PDP–Laban | Won |
For Board Member
| Vote! | Abigael Alonte | Nacionalista | Won |
| Re-Elect | JM Carait | Nacionalista | Won |
| Vote! | Ann Matibag | PDP–Laban | Won |
2nd District
For House Of Representative
| Vote! | Ruth Mariano-Hernandez | Independent | Won |
For Board Member
| Vote! | Christian "Niño" Lajara | Nacionalista | Won |
| Vote! | Peewee Perez | PDP–Laban | Won |
| Vote! | Ron Retaga | PDP–Laban | Lost |
3rd District
For House Of Representative
| Vote! | Sol Aragones | Nacionalista | Won |
For Board Member
| Re-Elect | Dante Amante | PDP–Laban | Lost |
| Re-Elect | Abi Yu | PDP–Laban | Won |
4th District
For House Of Representative
| Re-Elect | Benjie Agarao | PDP–Laban | Won |
For Board Member
| Vote! | Jam Agarao | PDP–Laban | Won |
| Vote! | Rommel Palacol | PDP–Laban | Lost |

Partido Federal ng Pilipinas
| # | Name | Party | Result |
For Governor
| Vote! | E.R Ejercito | PFP | Lost |
1st District
For Board Member
| Vote! | Gab Alatiit | PFP | Lost |
2nd District
For Board Member
| Vote! | Neptali Bagnes | PFP | Won |
| Vote! | Francis Calderon | PFP | Lost |
3rd District
For Board Member
| Vote! | Angelica Jones | PFP | Won |

=== Governor ===
Incumbent Governor Ramil Hernandez is running for his second term against his main rival in 2016 elections, former governor ER Ejercito.

Laguna Gubernatorial Election
| Party | Candidate | Votes | % |
|---|---|---|---|
| PDP–Laban | Ramil Hernandez (Incumbent) | 817,250 | 66.55 |
| PFP | E. R. Ejercito | 391,270 | 31.86 |
| Independent | Berlene Alberto | 7,414 | 0.60 |
| PDDS | Lope Grajera | 4,362 | 0.35 |
| Independent | Leonardo Almadrigo | 4,063 | 0.33 |
| Independent | Manolo Samia | 3,652 | 0.29 |
| Total votes | | 1,227,214 | 100.00 |
| PDP–Laban hold | | | |

=== Vice Governor ===
Laguna Vice Gubernatorial Election
| Party | Candidate | Votes | % |
|---|---|---|---|
| PDP–Laban | Katherine Agapay (Incumbent) | 930,387 | 89.95 |
| Independent | Mateo San Sebastian | 103,981 | 10.05 |
| Total votes | | 1,034,368 | 100.00 |
| PDP–Laban hold | | | |

== Congressional Elections ==
=== 1st District ===
Incumbent Arlene Arcillas ran for Mayor of Santa Rosa. Her party nominated incumbent Santa Rosa Mayor Dan Fernandez and ran unopposed.

2019 Philippine House of Representatives election in Laguna 1st District.
| Party | Candidate | Votes | % |
|---|---|---|---|
| PDP–Laban | Dan Fernandez | 188,929 | 100.00 |
| Total votes | | 188,929 | 100.00 |
| PDP–Laban hold | | | |

=== 2nd District ===
Incumbent Joaquin Chipeco, Jr. ran in the newly created Lone District of Calamba. Ran for the position are former Euro general Jaime Caringal, former PAGCOR chief Efraim Genuino, former Cabuyao Mayor Isidro Hemedes, Jr., incumbent Board Member Ruth Mariano-Hernandez, Tirso Lavinia, and retired district judge Rosauro Revilla.

2019 Philippine House of Representatives election in Laguna 2nd District.
| Party | Candidate | Votes | % |
|---|---|---|---|
| Independent | Ruth Mariano-Hernandez | 76,386 | 36.16 |
| Independent | Efraim Genuino | 68,162 | 32.26 |
| Independent | Isidro "Jun" Hemedes, Jr. | 44,077 | 20.86 |
| Independent | Jaime Caringal | 19,972 | 9.45 |
| PDSP | Tirso Laviña | 1,580 | 0.75 |
| PDDS | Rosauro Revilla | 1,095 | 0.52 |
| Total votes | | 211,272 | 100.00 |
| Independent gain from Nacionalista | | | |

=== 3rd District ===
2019 Philippine House of Representatives election in Laguna 3rd District.
| Party | Candidate | Votes | % |
|---|---|---|---|
| Nacionalista | Sol Aragones (Incumbent) | 214,899 | 95.76 |
| Independent | Ma. Cristina Villamor | 6,078 | 2.69 |
| Independent | King Mediano | 3,508 | 1.55 |
| Total votes | | 224,375 | 100.00 |
| Nacionalista hold | | | |

=== 4th District ===
2019 Philippine House of Representatives election in Laguna 4th District.
| Party | Candidate | Votes | % |
|---|---|---|---|
| PDP–Laban | Benjamin Agarao Jr. (Incumbent) | 146,602 | 58.06 |
| Nacionalista | Antonio "Tony" Carolino | 105,886 | 41.94 |
| Total votes | | 252,488 | 100.00 |
| PDP–Laban hold | | | |

=== Biñan ===
2019 Philippine House of Representatives election in Biñan's Lone District.
| Party | Candidate | Votes | % |
|---|---|---|---|
| PDP–Laban | Marlyn Alonte-Naguiat (Incumbent) | 95,435 | 83.75 |
| PDDS | Crispulo Antonio | 18,515 | 16.25 |
| Total votes | | 113,950 | 100.00 |
| PDP–Laban hold | | | |

=== Calamba ===
Joaquin Chipeco, Jr. from the 2nd District ran for the new seat unopposed.

2019 Philippine House of Representatives election in the Calamba's lone district
| Party | Candidate | Votes | % |
|---|---|---|---|
| Nacionalista | Jun Chipeco Jr. | 149,428 | 100.00 |
| Valid ballots | | 149,428 | 76.63 |
| Invalid or blank votes | | 45,571 | 23.36 |
| Total votes | | 194,999 | 100.00 |
| Nacionalista win (new seat) | | | |

== Provincial Board Members ==
| Party | Popular vote | | Seats | |
| Party | Total | % | Total | % |
|---|---|---|---|---|
| PDP–Laban | 923,192 | 39.13% | 4 | 31% |
| Nacionalista | 797,188 | 33.79% | 4 | 31% |
| PFP | 460,595 | 19.52% | 2 | 15% |
| Bigkis | 60,450 | 2.56% | 0 | 0% |
| PDDS | 30,918 | 1.31% | 0 | 0% |
| Independent | 86,895 | 3.68% | 0 | 0% |
| Total | 2,359,238 | 100% | 10 | 77% |

=== 1st District ===
- Cities: Biñan, Santa Rosa City, San Pedro City

2019 Provincial Board Election in 1st District of Laguna
| Party | Candidate | Votes | % |
|---|---|---|---|
| PDP–Laban | Ann Matibag | 245,491 | 31.02 |
| Nacionalista | JM Carait | 195,685 | 24.74 |
| Nacionalista | Abigael Alonte | 190,504 | 24.07 |
| PFP | Gabnulang Alatiit | 128,704 | 16.26 |
| PDDS | Alvin Abaja | 30,918 | 3.91 |
| Total votes | | 791,302 | 100.00 |

=== 2nd District ===
- Cities: Cabuyao, Calamba
- Municipalities: Bay, Los Baños

2019 Provincial Board Election in 2nd District of Laguna
| Party | Candidate | Votes | % |
|---|---|---|---|
| Nacionalista | Christian Niño Lajara | 223,060 | 26.10 |
| PDP–Laban | Peewee Perez | 194,428 | 22.75 |
| PFP | Neptali Bagnes | 154,572 | 18.09 |
| PDP–Laban | Ron Retaga | 65,957 | 7.72 |
| Bigkis | Eric John Unico | 60,450 | 7.07 |
| Nacionalista | Ariel Vanguardia | 52,903 | 6.19 |
| Independent | Enrico Villanueva | 51,971 | 6.08 |
| PFP | Francis Calderon | 51,295 | 6.0 |
| Total votes | | 854,636 | 100.00 |

=== 3rd District ===
- Cities: San Pablo City
- Municipalities: Alaminos, Calauan, Liliw. Nagcarlan, Rizal, Victoria

2019 Provincial Board Election in 3rd District of Laguna
| Party | Candidate | Votes | % |
|---|---|---|---|
| PFP | Angelica Jones Alarva-Banaag | 126,024 | 36.13 |
| PDP–Laban | Abi Yu (Incumbent) | 107,249 | 30.74 |
| PDP–Laban | Dante Amante | 80,610 | 23.11 |
| Independent | Joseph Corcolon | 24,524 | 7.03 |
| Independent | Renato Conducto | 10,400 | 2.98 |
| Total votes | | 348,807 | 100.00 |

=== 4th District ===
- Municipalities: Cavinti, Famy, Kalayaan, Luisiana, Lumban, Mabitac, Magdalena, Majayjay, Paete, Pagsanjan, Pakil, Pangil, Pila, Santa Cruz, Santa Maria, Siniloan

2019 Provincial Board Election in 4th District of Laguna
| Party | Candidate | Votes | % |
|---|---|---|---|
| PDP–Laban | Maria Jamina Katherine Agarao | 156,588 | 42.96 |
| Nacionalista | Rai-Ann Agustine San Luis (Incumbent) | 109,169 | 29.95 |
| PDP–Laban | Rommel Palacol | 72,869 | 19.99 |
| Nacionalista | Reuben Robinson Orillaza | 25,867 | 7.09 |
| Total votes | | 364,493 | 100.00 |

== City and municipal elections ==
All municipalities of Laguna, Biñan, Cabuyao, Calamba, San Pablo City, San Pedro City and Santa Rosa City elected a mayor and a vice-mayor this election. The candidates for mayor and vice mayor with the highest number of votes wins the seat; they are voted separately, therefore, they may be of different parties when elected. Below is the list of mayoralty candidates of each city and municipalities per district.

=== 1st District ===
- Cities: San Pedro City, Santa Rosa City

==== San Pedro City ====
Incumbent Lourdes Cataquiz ran for reelection. Her opponent was incumbent Vice Mayor Iryne Vierneza.

San Pedro City mayoralty election
| Party | Candidate | Votes | % |
|---|---|---|---|
| Nacionalista | Lourdes Catáquiz | 66,424 | 59.76 |
| PDP–Laban | Iryne Vierneza | 48,187 | 40.24 |
| Total votes | | 114,611 | 100.00 |

Incumbent Iryne Vierneza ran for Mayor. Her party nominated Art Joseph Francis Mercado, nephew of former 1-UTAK Party list Representative Homer Mercado and son of JAM Transit operator Alita Mercado. His opponent was Delio Hatulan.

San Pedro City vice mayoralty election
| Party | Candidate | Votes | % |
|---|---|---|---|
| PDP–Laban | Art Joseph Francis Mercado | 70,376 | 62.84 |
| Nacionalista | Delio Hatulan | 41,615 | 37.16 |
| Total votes | | 111,991 | 100.00 |

==== Santa Rosa City ====
Incumbent Dan Fernandez ran for Congress. His party nominated incumbent Congresswoman Arlene Arcillas.

Santa Rosa City mayoralty election
| Party | Candidate | Votes | % |
|---|---|---|---|
| PDP–Laban | Arlene B. Arcillas | 97,056 | 70.20 |
| PDDS | Alicia Lazaga | 30,318 | 21.97 |
| Independent | Cesar Hernandez | 10,875 | 7.87 |
| Total votes | | 138,249 | 100.00 |
| PDP–Laban hold | | | |

Incumbent Arnold Arcillas ran for reelection.

Santa Rosa City vice mayoralty election
| Party | Candidate | Votes | % |
|---|---|---|---|
| NPC | Arnel Gomez | 69,093 | 51.24 |
| PDP–Laban | Arnold Arcillas | 65,756 | 48.76 |
| Total votes | | 134,849 | 100.00 |
| NPC gain from PDP–Laban | | | |

=== 2nd District ===
- City: Cabuyao
- Municipality: Bay, Los Baños

==== Cabuyao ====
Incumbent Rommel Gecolea ran for reelection

Cabuyao mayoral election
| Party | Candidate | Votes | % |
|---|---|---|---|
| PDP–Laban | Rommel Gecolea (Incumbent) | 98,340 | 68.23 |
| Nacionalista | Dennis Felipe Hain | 45,790 | 31.77 |
| Total votes | | 144,130 | 100.00 |
| PDP–Laban hold | | | |

Incumbent Jose Benso Aguillo ran for reelection.

Cabuyao vice mayoral election
| Party | Candidate | Votes | % |
|---|---|---|---|
| PDP–Laban | Leif Laiglon Opiña | 87,950 | 63.15 |
| Nacionalista | Jose Benson Aguillo (Incumbent) | 51,321 | 36.85 |
| Total votes | | 139,271 | 100.00 |
| PDP–Laban gain from Nacionalista | | | |

==== Bay ====
Bay Mayoral election
| Party | Candidate | Votes | % |
|---|---|---|---|
| PDP–Laban | Jose Padrid | 20.790 | 72.29 |
| Lakas | Edwin Ramos | 7,969 | 27.71 |
| Total votes | | 28,759 | 100.00 |
| PDP–Laban hold | | | |

Bay Vice Mayoral election
| Party | Candidate | Votes | % |
|---|---|---|---|
| Lakas | Emerson Ilagan | 13,594 | 51.28 |
| PDP–Laban | Soriano Escueta | 12,913 | 48.72 |
| Total votes | | 26,507 | 100.00 |
| Lakas hold | | | |

==== Los Baños ====
Los Baños Mayoral election
| Party | Candidate | Votes | % |
|---|---|---|---|
| Independent | Caesar Perez (Incumbent) | 18,459 | 38.37 |
| PFP | Celerino Balasoto, Jr. | 12,564 | 26.11 |
| KDP | Ferdinand Vargas | 11,717 | 24.35 |
| Independent | Norvin Tamisin | 4,597 | 9.55 |
| Independent | Leo De Guzman | 775 | 1.61 |
| Total votes | | 48,112 | 100.00 |

Los Baños Vice Mayoral election
| Party | Candidate | Votes | % |
|---|---|---|---|
| Independent | Antonio Kalaw | 18,894 | 41.46 |
| Independent | Procopio Alipon | 15,992 | 35.09 |
| Nacionalista | Jay Rolusta | 11,393 | 23.45 |
| Total votes | | 45,579 | 100.00 |

=== 3rd District ===
- City: San Pablo City
- Municipality: Alaminos, Calauan, Liliw. Nagcarlan, Rizal, Victoria

==== San Pablo City ====
Incumbent Loreto Amante ran reelection for his 3rd and last term for mayor his opponent is former councilor Arsenio Escudero, Jr.

San Pablo City Mayoral election
| Party | Candidate | Votes | % |
|---|---|---|---|
| Nacionalista | Loreto Amante (Incumbent) | 68,378 | 65.72 |
| PDP–Laban | Arsenio Escudero, Jr. | 35,672 | 34.28 |
| Total votes | | 104,050 | 100.00 |

Incumbent Angie Yang her term is limited and now is running for councilor her party nominee is incumbent councilor Justin Colago running this place his opponent is Brgy. Sto Angel Chairman Cesarito Ticzon and Atty/Dr. Emmanuel Loyola

San Pablo City Vice Mayoral election
| Party | Candidate | Votes | % |
|---|---|---|---|
| Nacionalista | Justin Colago | 53,050 | 50.40 |
| PDP–Laban | Cesarito Ticzon | 39,596 | 37.62 |
| PDDS | Emmanuel Loyola | 12,608 | 11.98 |
| Total votes | | 105,254 | 100.00 |
| Nacionalista hold | | | |

==== Alaminos ====
Alaminos Mayoral election
| Party | Candidate | Votes | % |
|---|---|---|---|
| Nacionalista | Eladio Magampon | 11,565 | 50.20 |
| PDP–Laban | Loreto Masa (Incumbent) | 11,457 | 49.80 |
| Total votes | | 23,022 | 100.00 |

Alaminos Vice Mayoral election
| Party | Candidate | Votes | % |
|---|---|---|---|
| Nacionalista | Ruben Alvarez | 11,623 | 52.40 |
| PDP–Laban | Lorelei Pampolina | 10,577 | 47.60 |
| Total votes | | 22,200 | 100.00 |
| Nacionalista hold | | | |

==== Calauan ====
Calauan Mayoral election
| Party | Candidate | Votes | % |
|---|---|---|---|
| PDP–Laban | Buenafrido Berris | 12,077 | 39.70 |
| NPC | Roseller Caratihan | 9,980 | 32.80 |
| Nacionalista | Allan Jun Sanchez | 8,370 | 27.50 |
| Total votes | | 30,427 | 100.00 |

Calauan Vice Mayoral election
| Party | Candidate | Votes | % |
|---|---|---|---|
| PDP–Laban | Chesskha Hernandez | 12,991 | 44.38 |
| Independent | Kenneth Kraft | 9,617 | 32.86 |
| Nacionalista | Allan Antonio Sanchez II | 6,663 | 22.76 |
| Total votes | | 29,271 | 100.00 |
| PDP–Laban hold | | | |

==== Liliw ====
Liliw Mayoral election
| Party | Candidate | Votes | % |
|---|---|---|---|
| PDP–Laban | Eric Sulibit (Incumbent) | 12,385 | 100.00 |
| Total votes | | 12,385 | 100.00 |
| PDP–Laban hold | | | |

Liliw Vice Mayoral election
| Party | Candidate | Votes | % |
|---|---|---|---|
| Independent | Arnold Montesines | 9,809 | 55.32 |
| PDP–Laban | Ediel Franco Ilosco | 7,921 | 44.68 |
| Total votes | | 17,730 | 100.00 |

==== Nagcarlan ====
Nagcarlan Mayoral election
| Party | Candidate | Votes | % |
|---|---|---|---|
| Nacionalista | Ody Arcasetas | 17,781 | 54.78 |
| PDP–Laban | Amie Malabag-Hernandez | 10,897 | 33.58 |
| Lakas | Manolo Cura | 3,777 | 11.64 |
| Total votes | | 32,455 | 100.00 |
| Nacionalista hold | | | |

Nagcarlan Vice Mayoral election
| Party | Candidate | Votes | % |
|---|---|---|---|
| PDP–Laban | Rexon Arevalo | 13,171 | 42.14 |
| Nacionalista | Felipe Arcigal III | 12,041 | 38.53 |
| Independent | Cecille Plantilla | 3,946 | 12.63 |
| Lakas | Neri Monteza | 2,094 | 6.70 |
| Total votes | | 31,252 | 100.00 |
| PDP–Laban hold | | | |

==== Rizal ====
Rizal Mayoral election
| Party | Candidate | Votes | % |
|---|---|---|---|
| PDP–Laban | Vener Muñoz | 5,747 | 55.05 |
| PFP | Jeffrey Palce | 4,692 | 44.95 |
| Total votes | | 10,439 | 100.00 |
| PDP–Laban hold | | | |

Rizal Vice Mayoral election
| Party | Candidate | Votes | % |
|---|---|---|---|
| PDP–Laban | Antonino Aurelio | 5,906 | 58.40 |
| PFP | Marlon Solquia | 4,269 | 41.60 |
| Total votes | | 10,175 | 100.00 |
| PDP–Laban hold | | | |

==== Victoria ====
Victoria Mayoral election
| Party | Candidate | Votes | % |
|---|---|---|---|
| NPC | Francisco Almeida | 8,498 | 40.95 |
| PDP–Laban | AU Gonzales | 6,766 | 32.6 |
| Nacionalista | Florencio Laraño | 5,283 | 25.46 |
| Independent | Saturnino Rebong III | 160 | 0.77 |
| Independent | Jose Olivar | 45 | 0.21 |
| Total votes | | 20,752 | 100.00 |
| NPC hold | | | |

Victoria Vice Mayoral election
| Party | Candidate | Votes | % |
|---|---|---|---|
| PDP–Laban | Dwight Kampitan | 7,956 | 39.94 |
| NPC | Sonny Lazaro | 6,734 | 33.80 |
| Nacionalista | Rizaldy San Jose | 5,231 | 26.26 |
| Total votes | | 19,921 | 100.00 |
| PDP–Laban hold | | | |

=== 4th District ===
- Municipality: Cavinti, Famy, Kalayaan, Luisiana, Lumban, Mabitac, Magdalena, Majayjay, Paete, Pagsanjan, Pakil, Pangil, Pila, Santa Cruz, Santa Maria, Siniloan

==== Cavinti ====
Cavinti Mayoral election
| Party | Candidate | Votes | % |
|---|---|---|---|
| PDP–Laban | Milbert Oliveros | 8,572 | 64.52 |
| PFP | Bethoven Dela Torre | 4,713 | 35.48 |
| Total votes | | 13,285 | 100.00 |

Cavinti Vice Mayoral election
| Party | Candidate | Votes | % |
|---|---|---|---|
| PDP–Laban | Arrantlee Arroyo | 6,777 | 52.06 |
| PFP | Florcelie Esguerra | 6,241 | 47.94 |
| Total votes | | 13,018 | 100 |
| PDP–Laban hold | | | |

==== Famy ====
Famy Mayoral election
| Party | Candidate | Votes | % |
|---|---|---|---|
| PDP–Laban | Edwin Pangilinan | 3,041 | 33.91 |
| Nacionalista | Renonia Muramatsu | 2,797 | 31.12 |
| Lakas | Florencio Lameyra | 1,837 | 20.48 |
| PFP | Emmanuel Acomular | 1,294 | 14.43 |
| Total votes | | 8,969 | 100.00 |

Famy Vice Mayoral election
| Party | Candidate | Votes | % |
|---|---|---|---|
| PDP–Laban | Gertrudes Andaya | 3,387 | 40.29 |
| PFP | Evelyn Coronado | 2,726 | 32.43 |
| Nacionalista | Rex Capistrano | 1,523 | 18.12 |
| Lakas | Maximo Razon | 770 | 9.16 |
| Total votes | | 8,406 | 100.00 |
| PDP–Laban hold | | | |

==== Kalayaan ====
Kalayaan Mayoral election
| Party | Candidate | Votes | % |
|---|---|---|---|
| NPC | Sandy Laganapan | 6,250 | 53.06 |
| PDP–Laban | Leni Adao | 5,530 | 46.94 |
| Total votes | | 11,780 | 100.00 |
| NPC hold | | | |

Kalayaan Vice Mayoral election
| Party | Candidate | Votes | % |
|---|---|---|---|
| NPC | Kenneth Ragaza | 6,316 | 54.78 |
| PDP–Laban | Laarni Lopez | 5,213 | 45.22 |
| Total votes | | 11,529 | 100.00 |
| NPC hold | | | |

==== Luisiana ====
Luisiana Mayoral election
| Party | Candidate | Votes | % |
|---|---|---|---|
| PDP–Laban | Nestor Rondilla | 7,359 | 67.00 |
| Lakas | Luibic R. Jacob | 3,624 | 33.00 |
| Total votes | | 10,983 | 100.00 |

Luisiana Vice Mayoral election
| Party | Candidate | Votes | % |
|---|---|---|---|
| PDP–Laban | Armando Taguilaso | 4,737 | 41.00 |
| Independent | Manuel Rondilla | 3,815 | 36.00 |
| Lakas | Elaine Teope | 2,306 | 22.00 |
| Total votes | | 10,858 | 100.00 |
| PDP–Laban hold | | | |

==== Lumban ====
Lumban Mayoral election
| Party | Candidate | Votes | % |
|---|---|---|---|
| PDP–Laban | Rolan Ubatay | 12,016 | 100.00 |
| Total votes | | 12,016 | 100.00 |
| PDP–Laban hold | | | |

Lumban Vice Mayoral election
| Party | Candidate | Votes | % |
|---|---|---|---|
| PDP–Laban | Belen Raga | 12,225 | 100.00 |
| Total votes | | 12,225 | 100.00 |
| PDP–Laban hold | | | |

==== Mabitac ====
Mabitac Mayoral election
| Party | Candidate | Votes | % |
|---|---|---|---|
| PDP–Laban | Ronald Ian Sana | 7,312 | 100.00 |
| Total votes | | 7,312 | 100.00 |
| PDP–Laban hold | | | |

Mabitac Vice Mayoral election
| Party | Candidate | Votes | % |
|---|---|---|---|
| NUP | Angelito Valderama, Sr. | 4,808 | 50.18 |
| PDP–Laban | Alberto Reyes | 4,774 | 49.82 |
| Total votes | | 9,582 | 100.00 |
| NUP hold | | | |

==== Magdalena ====
Magdalena Mayoral election
| Party | Candidate | Votes | % |
|---|---|---|---|
| PDP–Laban | David Aventurado, Jr. | 7,051 | 58.88 |
| LDP | Henry Chua | 4,924 | 41.12 |
| Total votes | | 11,975 | 100.00 |
| PDP–Laban hold | | | |

Magdalena Vice Mayoral election
| Party | Candidate | Votes | % |
|---|---|---|---|
| LDP | Pedro Bucal | 7,838 | 66.84 |
| PDP–Laban | Amado Criste, Jr. | 3,888 | 33.16 |
| Total votes | | 11,726 | 100.00 |
| LDP hold | | | |

==== Majayjay ====
Majayjay Mayoral election
| Party | Candidate | Votes | % |
|---|---|---|---|
| PDP–Laban | Jojo Clado | 8,030 | 52.29 |
| Nacionalista | Eulogio Wilson Amorado | 7,328 | 37.71 |
| Total votes | | 15,358 | 100.00 |
| PDP–Laban hold | | | |

Majayjay Vice Mayoral election
| Party | Candidate | Votes | % |
|---|---|---|---|
| Nacionalista | Larry Mentilla | 7,735 | 51.72 |
| PDP–Laban | Edison Reyes | 7,221 | 48.28 |
| Total votes | | 14,956 | 100.00 |
| Nacionalista hold | | | |

==== Paete ====
Paete Mayoral election
| Party | Candidate | Votes | % |
|---|---|---|---|
| PDP–Laban | Mutuk Bagabaldo | 6,357 | 50.32 |
| NPC | Emmanuel Cadayona | 6,278 | 49.69 |
| Total votes | | 12,635 | 100.00 |
| PDP–Laban hold | | | |

Paete Vice Mayoral election
| Party | Candidate | Votes | % |
|---|---|---|---|
| PDP–Laban | Aurelio Paraiso | 6,269 | 51.05 |
| Nacionalista | Gido Bagayana | 6,011 | 48.95 |
| Total votes | | 12,280 | 100.00 |
| PDP–Laban hold | | | |

==== Pagsanjan ====
Pagsanjan Mayoral election
| Party | Candidate | Votes | % |
|---|---|---|---|
| PDP–Laban | Peter Casius Trinidad | 12,851 | 64.64 |
| PFP | John Paul Ejercito | 7,030 | 35.36 |
| Total votes | | 19,881 | 100.00 |
| PDP–Laban hold | | | |

Pagsanjan Vice Mayoral election
| Party | Candidate | Votes | % |
|---|---|---|---|
| PFP | Girlie Ejercito | 8,534 | 43.57 |
| PDP–Laban | Noel Cabela | 6,663 | 34.11 |
| Independent | Julius Guan | 4,392 | 22.42 |
| Total votes | | 19,589 | 100.00 |
| PFP hold | | | |

==== Pakil ====
Pakil Mayoral election
| Party | Candidate | Votes | % |
|---|---|---|---|
| PDP–Laban | Vincent Soriano | 8,504 | 82.10 |
| PFP | Fernando Cabañero | 1,854 | 17.90 |
| Total votes | | 10,358 | 100.00 |

Pakil Vice Mayoral election
| Party | Candidate | Votes | % |
|---|---|---|---|
| Independent | Vipops Charles Martinez | 4,402 | 40.82 |
| Independent | Geraldine Dizon | 3,545 | 32.87 |
| Lakas | Melody Familara | 2,706 | 25.09 |
| Independent | Hyacinth Peralta | 132 | 1.22 |
| Total votes | | 10,785 | 100.00 |
| PDP–Laban hold | | | |

==== Pangil ====
Incumbent Mayor Oscar Rafanan of sought reelection against, former Mayor Jovito Reyes, Alfredo Acaylar, Arturo Capito and incumbent Vice Mayor Alfredo Pajarillo.

Pangil mayoral election
| Party | Candidate | Votes | % |
|---|---|---|---|
| UNA | Jovit Reyes | 4,341 | 39.84 |
| PDP–Laban | Oscar Rafanan | 3,391 | 31.12 |
| PFP | Alfredo Pajarillo | 2,026 | 18.59 |
| KDP | Arturo Capito | 1,064 | 9.76 |
| Independent | Freddie Acaylar | 75 | 0.68 |
| Total votes | | 10,897 | 100.00 |
| UNA hold | | | |

Incumbent Vice Mayor Alfredo Pajarillo of Partido Federal ng Pilipinas ran for Mayor.

Pangil vice mayoral election
| Party | Candidate | Votes | % |
|---|---|---|---|
| PDP–Laban | Gerald Aritao | 4,555 | 43.52 |
| PFP | Franco Galvez | 2,036 | 19.45 |
| UNA | Roy Velasquez | 3,220 | 30.76 |
| KDP | Regina Oclarino | 656 | 6.27 |
| Total votes | | 10,467 | 100.00 |
| PDP–Laban hold | | | |

==== Pila ====
Pila Mayoral election
| Party | Candidate | Votes | % |
|---|---|---|---|
| PDP–Laban | Edgardo Ramos | 16,224 | 64.88 |
| Nacionalista | Wilfredo Quiat | 8,782 | 35.12 |
| Total votes | | 25,006 | 100.00 |
| PDP–Laban hold | | | |

Pila Vice Mayoral election
| Party | Candidate | Votes | % |
|---|---|---|---|
| PDP–Laban | Reggie Mhar Bote | 13,386 | 54.54 |
| Nacionalista | Queen Marilyd Alarva | 11,159 | 45.46 |
| Total votes | | 24,545 | 100.00 |
| PDP–Laban hold | | | |

==== Santa Cruz ====
In a bid to reclaim his old post, former Mayor Ariel Magcalas is seeking for a comeback trail as Mayor of Santa Cruz, Laguna. His opponents are former Congressman Edgar San Luis and Incumbent Board Member Benjo Agarao.

Santa Cruz Mayoral election
| Party | Candidate | Votes | % |
|---|---|---|---|
| Nacionalista | Edgar San Luis | 25,075 | 48.09 |
| PDP–Laban | Benjo Agarao | 23,547 | 45.16 |
| KDP | Ariel Magcalas | 3,521 | 6.75 |
| Total votes | | 52,143 | 100.00 |
| Nacionalista hold | | | |

Santa Cruz Vice Mayoral election
| Party | Candidate | Votes | % |
|---|---|---|---|
| KDP | Laarni Malibiran | 23,149 | 45.38 |
| Nacionalista | Dennis Panganiban | 15,189 | 29.78 |
| PDP–Laban | Rizaldy Kalaw | 12,669 | 24.84 |
| Total votes | | 51,007 | 100.00 |
| KDP hold | | | |

==== Santa Maria ====
Santa Maria Mayoral election
| Party | Candidate | Votes | % |
|---|---|---|---|
| Nacionalista | Cindy Carolino | 13,252 | 100.00 |
| Total votes | | 13,252 | 100.00 |
| Nacionalista hold | | | |

Santa Maria Vice Mayoral election
| Party | Candidate | Votes | % |
|---|---|---|---|
| Nacionalista | Virginia Tuazon | 11,642 | 100.00 |
| Total votes | | 11,642 | 100.00 |
| Nacionalista hold | | | |

==== Siniloan ====
Siniloan Mayoral election
| Party | Candidate | Votes | % |
|---|---|---|---|
| PFP | Rainier Leopando | 8,102 | 43.02 |
| PDP–Laban | Eduardo Tibay | 7,026 | 37.30 |
| Nacionalista | Roberto Acoba | 3,292 | 17.48 |
| Lakas | Domingo Dando | 414 | 2.20 |
| Total votes | | 18,834 | 100.00 |
| PFP hold | | | |

Siniloan Vice Mayoral election
| Party | Candidate | Votes | % |
|---|---|---|---|
| PDP–Laban | Patrick Go | 7,433 | 41.10 |
| PFP | Rico Suñega | 7,058 | 39.02 |
| Nacionalista | Ronan Masacupan | 3,596 | 19.88 |
| Total votes | | 18,087 | 100.00 |
| PDP–Laban hold | | | |

=== Biñan ===
Biñan Mayoral election
| Party | Candidate | Votes | % |
|---|---|---|---|
| PDP–Laban | Walfredo Dimaguila, Jr. | 67,674 | 53.99 |
| PDDS | Donna Angela Yatco | 57,662 | 46.01 |
| Total votes | | 125,336 | 100.00 |
| PDP–Laban hold | | | |

Biñan Vice Mayoral election
| Party | Candidate | Votes | % |
|---|---|---|---|
| PDP–Laban | Angelo Alonte | 93,442 | 100.00 |
| Total votes | | 93,442 | 100.00 |
| PDP–Laban hold | | | |

=== Calamba ===
Calamba mayoral election
| Party | Candidate | Votes | % |
|---|---|---|---|
| Nacionalista | Justin Marc B. Chipeco | 153,549 | 88.98 |
| Independent | Anthony Castillo | 15,671 | 9.08 |
| Independent | Joel Agojo | 1,913 | 1.11 |
| Independent | Ramon Rivera | 1,437 | .83 |
| Total votes | | 172,570 | 100 |
| Nacionalista hold | | | |

Calamba vice mayoral election
| Party | Candidate | Votes | % |
|---|---|---|---|
| Nacionalista | Roseller Rizal | 145,971 | 100.00 |
| Total votes | | 145,971 | 100.00 |
| Nacionalista hold | | | |
