= Calamba City Council =

Legislative body of the city of Calamba, Philippines

Calamba City Council Sangguniang Panlungsod ng Calamba

Type
- Type: Unicameral
- Term limits: 3 terms (9 years)

Leadership
- Presiding Officer: Angelito S. Lazaro, Lakas–CMD

Structure
- Seats: 14 councilors (including 2 ex officio members); 1 ex officio presiding officer
- Political groups: Lakas–CMD (11) PFP (1) Nonpartisan (2)
- Length of term: 3 years
- Authority: Calamba City Charter; Local Government Code of the Philippines

Elections
- Voting system: Plurality-at-large voting (12 seats); Indirect elections (2 seats)
- Last election: May 12, 2025
- Next election: May 15, 2028

Meeting place
- Calamba City Hall

The Calamba City Council (Filipino: Sangguniang Panlungsod ng Calamba) is Calamba's Sangguniang Panlungsod or legislative body. The council has 15 members which is composed of 12 councilors, one ex officio member elected from the ranks of barangay (village) chairmen, one ex officio member elected from the ranks of Sangguniang Kabataan (youth council) chairmen and one presiding officer. The Vice-mayor of the city is the presiding officer of the council, who is elected citywide.

The council is responsible for creating laws and ordinances under the city's jurisdiction. The mayor can veto proposed bills, but the council can override it with a two-thirds supermajority.

== Powers, duties and functions ==
The Local Government Code of 1991 (Republic Act No. 7160), which establishes the Sangguniang Panlungsod as the city's legislative body, contains the following requirements:

- Pass legislation;
- Consent to resolutions;
- Adequate funding for the city's and its residents' general wellbeing; and
- Make sure the city is exercising its corporate rights in accordance with Section 22 of the Local Government Code.

Additionally, the Sangguniang Panlungsod is given responsibility for the following tasks and activities:

- approve the resolutions and ordinances required for an effective and efficient city government;
- Generate and maximize the utilization of funds and resources for the city's development plans, program goals, and top priorities as specified in Section 18 of the Local Government Code of 1991, paying special attention to expansion and improvement in the entire metropolis and agro-industrial development;
- Pass laws awarding franchises and permitting the issuance of permits or licenses, subject to the guidelines in Book II of the Local Government Code of 1991, but with conditions and goals intended to advance the welfare of the city's residents;
- Control activities pertaining to the use of land, buildings, and structures inside the city to advance the welfare of its populace as a whole;
- Approve ordinances that would guarantee the effective and efficient provision of the fundamental facilities and services as specified in Section 17 of the Local Government Code; and
- Use any additional powers and carry out any additional tasks or obligations outlined in a law or ordinance.

== Membership ==
The city elects twelve members of the council at-large. In plurality-at-large voting, a voter may vote for up to twelve candidates and the candidates with the twelve highest numbers of votes are elected. Barangay and SK chairs throughout the city each elect a representative to the council, for a total of 14 councilors. City-council elections are synchronized with other elections in the country, which have been held on the second Monday of May every third year since 1992.

=== 2025 - 2028 Membership ===
Position	Name	Party
Presiding Officer	Angelito S. Lazaro Jr.	Lakas
Councilors	Soliman B. Lajara	AKAY
Councilors	Joselito G. Catindig	Lakas
Councilors	Leeanne P. Aldabe-Cortez	Lakas
Councilors	Doreen May F. Cabrera-Silva	Lakas
Councilors	Gerard R. Teruel	Lakas
Councilors	Maria Kathrina V. Silva-Evangelista	Lakas
Councilors	Christian Niño S. Lajara	Lakas
Councilors	Pursino C. Oruga	Lakas
Councilors	Arvin L. Manguiat	Lakas
Councilors	Pio C. Dimapilis	Lakas
Councilors	Moises E. Morales	Lakas
Councilors	Juan Carlo C. Lazaro	Lakas
ABC President	Eduardo R. Silva (La Mesa)	Nonpartisan
SK President	Rally R.Bustria (Barangay 5)	Nonpartisan

== Past members ==
=== 2022 - 2025 Membership ===
Position	Name	Party
Presiding Officer	Angelito S. Lazaro Jr.	PDP–Laban
Councilors	Joselito G. Catindig	Nacionalista
Councilors	Saturnino J. Lajara	Nacionalista
Councilors	Leeanne P. Aldabe-Cortez	Nacionalista
Councilors	Dyan DV. Espiridion	Nacionalista
Councilors	Juan C. Lazaro	Nacionalista
Councilors	Pursino C. Oruga	Nacionalista
Councilors	Moises E. Morales	Nacionalista
Councilors	Doreen May F. Cabrera-Silva	Nacionalista
Councilors	Gerard R. Teruel	PDP–Laban
Councilors	Arvin L. Manguiat	Nacionalista
Councilors	Edison M. Natividad	Nacionalista
Councilors	Maria Kathrina V. Silva-Evangelista	PDP–Laban
ABC President	Reginald C. Oliva (San Jose) (2022–2023); Eduardo R. Silva (La Mesa) (2023); Pio Dimapilis (Batino)	Nonpartisan
SK President	Kenneth P. Delas Llagas (Barangay 4) (2018-2023) Rally R.Bustria (Barangay 5)	Nonpartisan

=== 2019 - 2022 Membership ===
Position	Name	Party
Presiding Officer	Roseller H. Rizal	Nacionalista
Councilors	Julian Eugene SB. Chipeco	Nacionalista
Councilors	Charisse Anne C. Hernandez	Nacionalista
Councilors	Maria Virginia A. Alcasid	Nacionalista
Councilors	Pursino C. Oruga	Nacionalista
Councilors	Soliman B. Lajara	Independent
Councilors	Angelito S. Lazaro, Jr.	Nacionalista
Councilors	Saturnino J. Lajara	Nacionalista
Councilors	Dyan DV. Espiridion	Nacionalista
Councilors	Leeanne P. Aldabe-Cortez	PDP–Laban
Councilors	Juan C. Lazaro	Nacionalista
Councilors	Joselito G. Catindig	Independent
Councilors	Doreen May F. Cabrera	Independent
ABC President	Larry O. Dimayuga (Canlubang)	Nonpartisan
SK President	Kenneth P. Delas Llagas (Barangay 4)	Nonpartisan

=== 2016 - 2019 Membership ===
Position	Name	Party
Presiding Officer	Roseller H. Rizal	Nacionalista
Councilors	Edgardo H. Catindig	Nacionalista
Councilors	Moises E. Morales	Nacionalista
Councilors	Saturnino J. Lajara	Nacionalista
Councilors	Maria Virginia A. Alcasid	Nacionalista
Councilors	Charisse Anne C. Hernandez	Liberal
Councilors	Peewe P. Perez	Nacionalista
Councilors	Angelito S. Lazaro, Jr.	Independent
Councilors	Dyan DV. Espiridion	Independent
Councilors	Juan C. Lazaro	Liberal
Councilors	Santiago O. Atienza	Nacionalista
ABC President	Larry O. Dimayuga (Canlubang)	Nonpartisan
SK President	Kenneth P. Delas Llagas (Barangay 4)	Nonpartisan

=== 2013 - 2016 Membership ===
Position	Name	Party
Presiding Officer	Roseller H. Rizal	Nacionalista
Councilors	Edgardo H. Catindig	Nacionalista
Councilors	Ruth B. Mariano-Hernandez	Nacionalista
Councilors	Moises E. Morales	Nacionalista
Councilors	Peewee P. Perez	PDP–Laban
Councilors	Leeanne P. Aldabe	Nacionalista
Councilors	Christian Niño S. Lajara	PDP–Laban
Councilors	Luis Vergel G. Baroro	Nacionalista
Councilors	Maria Virginia A. Alcasid	PDP–Laban
Councilors	Jose Morel DC. Manaig	Nacionalista
Councilors	Santiago O. Atienza	Nacionalista

=== 2010 - 2013 Membership ===
Position	Name	Party
Presiding Officer	Severino J. Lajara	Nacionalista
Councilors	Ruth B. Mariano-Hernandez	Nacionalista
Councilors	Leeanne P. Aldabe	Lakas–Kampi
Councilors	Edgardo H. Catindig	Liberal
Councilors	Moises E. Morales	Lakas–Kampi
Councilors	Luis Vergel G. Baroro	Liberal
Councilors	Christian Niño S. Lajara	Lakas–Kampi
Councilors	Pewee P. Perez	Lakas–Kampi
Councilors	Jose Morel DC. Manaig	Liberal
Councilors	Juan C. Lazaro	Nacionalista
Councilors	Santiago O. Atienza	Nacionalista

=== 2007 - 2010 Membership ===
Position	Name	Party
Presiding Officer	Pursino C. Oruga	KAMPI
Councilors	Dyan DV. Espiridion	Lakas
Councilors	Ruth B. Mariano-Hernandez	PDP–Laban
Councilors	Luis Vergel G. Baroro	Lakas
Councilors	Leeanne P. Aldabe	Independent
Councilors	Eduardo R. Silva	Lakas
Councilors	Dennis R. Lanzanas	Lakas
Councilors	Pocholo J. Platon	Lakas
Councilors	Jose Morel DC. Manaig	Lakas
Councilors	Jose V. Pradas	Lakas
Councilors	Christian Niño S. Lajara	Independent

=== 2004 - 2007 Membership ===
Position	Name	Party
Presiding Officer	Pursino C. Oruga	Lakas
Councilors	Moises E. Morales	LDP
Councilors	Edgardo H. Catindig	LDP
Councilors	Dyan DV. Espirdion	Independent
Councilors	Pepito E. Casunuran	Lakas
Councilors	Pocholo J. Platon	Lakas
Councilors	Dennis R. Lanzanas	Lakas
Councilors	Santiago O. Atienza	Lakas
Councilors	Alvin A. Villa	Lakas
Councilors	Eduardo R. Silva	Lakas
Councilors	Juan C. Lazaro	LDP

=== 2001 - 2004 Membership ===
Position	Name	Party
Presiding Officer	Pursino C. Oruga	Lakas
Councilors	Ruth B. Mariano	Lakas
Councilors	Ramil L. Hernandez	Lakas
Councilors	Crispin M. Contreras	Lakas
Councilors	Pocholo J. Platon	Lakas
Councilors	Pepito B. Casunuran	Lakas
Councilors	Alvin A. Villa	Lakas
Councilors	Severino B. Vergara	Lakas
Councilors	Senador C. Alcalde	Lakas
Councilors	Eduardo R. Silva	Independent
Councilors	Edgardo H. Catindig	Lakas

== Prominent members ==
- Ramil Hernandez - Governor of Laguna
- Charisse Anne Hernandez - House of Representatives member for Lone District of Calamba
- Ruth Mariano-Hernandez - House of Representatives member for 2nd District of Laguna

== See also ==
- Calamba
