= 2019 Calamba local elections =

Philippine election

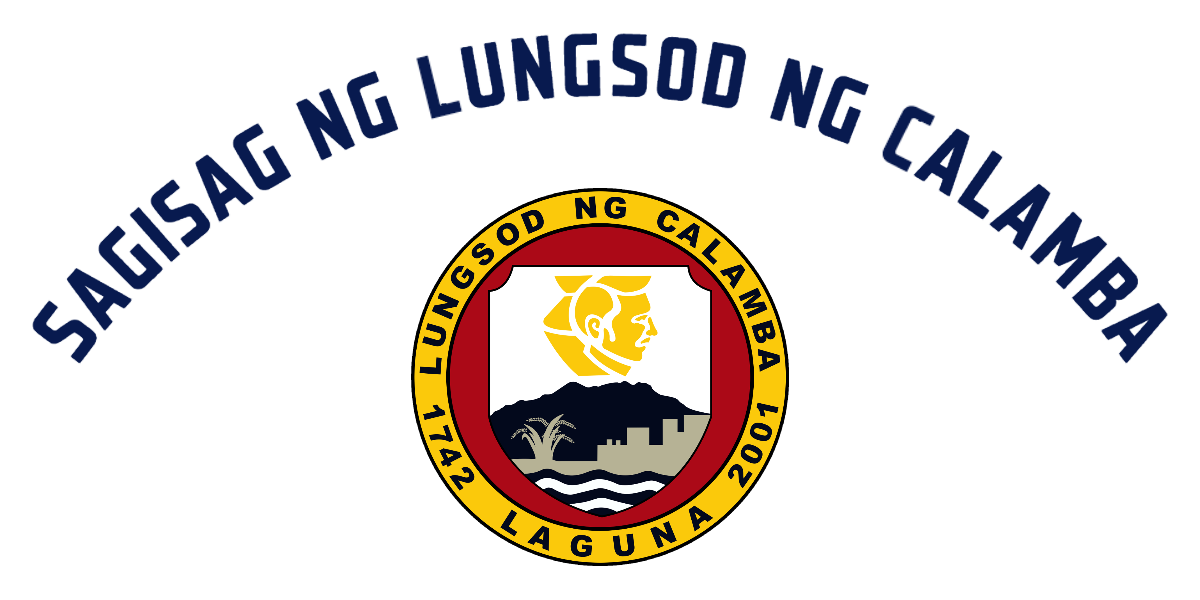
| ← 2016 | May 13, 2029 | 2022 → |
- Turnout: 62.88% ▼
- Mayoral election
| Candidate | Justin Marc Chipeco | Anthony Castillo |
| Party | Nacionalista | Independent |
| Running mate | Roseller Rizal |
| Popular vote | 153,549 | 15,671 |
| Percentage | 78.74% | 8.04% |
Mayor before election
Justin Marc Chipeco
Nacionalista
Elected mayor
Justin Marc Chipeco
Nacionalista
- Vice mayoral election
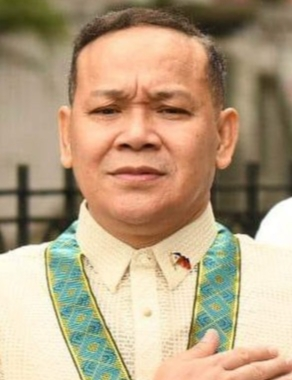
| Candidate | Roseller Rizal |
| Party | Nacionalista |
| Popular vote | 145,971 |
| Percentage | 74.86 |
Vice Mayor before election
Roseller Rizal
Nacionalista
Elected Vice Mayor
Roseller Rizal
Nacionalista
- City Council election

12 of 14 seats in the Calamba City Council 8 seats needed for a majority
| | First party | Second party | Third party |
|---|---|---|---|
| Party | Nacionalista | Independent | PDP–Laban |
| Seats won | 7 | 3 | 2 |
| Popular vote | 698,031 | 621,678 | 196,780 |
| Percentage | 41.91% | 37.33% | 11.81% |
| | Fourth party | Fifth party | Sixth party |
| Party | KDP | UNA | PFP |
| Seats won | 0 | 0 | 0 |
| Popular vote | 115,078 | 25,030 | 8,931 |
| Percentage | 6.91% | 1.50% | 0.54% |

Local elections were held in Calamba, Laguna, on May 13, 2019, within the Philippine general election, for posts of the mayor, vice mayor and twelve councilors. They will also elect their first representative of their newly created lone congressional district.

== Overview ==
The incumbent mayor, Justin Marc SB. Chipeco once again ran for mayoral post for the third consecutive time together with his running mate, the incumbent vice mayor Roseller Rizal. For the second time in a row, Rizal will run for vice mayoral position unopposed.

== Results ==
The candidates for mayor and vice mayor with the highest number of votes win. Candidates who are incumbent in the position they are running are in italic text.

=== Mayoral and vice mayoral elections ===
Calamba mayoralty election
| Party | Candidate | Votes | % |
|---|---|---|---|
| Nacionalista | Justin Marc Chipeco | 153,549 | 78.74 |
| Independent | Anthony Castillo | 15,671 | 8.04 |
| Independent | Joel Agojo | 1,913 | 0.98 |
| Independent | Ramon Rivera | 1,437 | 0.74 |
| Margin of victory | | 137,878 | 70.71 |
| Invalid or blank votes | | 22,429 | 11.50 |
| Total votes | | 194,999 | 100.00 |

Calamba vice mayoralty election
| Party | Candidate | Votes | % |
|---|---|---|---|
| Nacionalista | Roseller Rizal | 145,971 | 74.86 |
| Invalid or blank votes | | 49,028 | 25.14 |
| Total votes | | 194,999 | 100.00 |

=== City Council elections ===
Voters elected twelve councilors to comprise the City Council or the Sangguniang Panlungsod. Candidates voted separately so winning candidates came from different political parties. The twelve candidates with the highest number of votes won the seats. Incumbent city councilors Edgardo Catindig, Moises Morales, Peewee Perez, and Santiago Atienza did not run as their respective terms are limited. Perez ran as provincial board member of the 2nd District of Laguna instead.

2019 Calamba City Council
| Party | Candidate | Votes | % |
|---|---|---|---|
| Nacionalista | Julian Eugene Chipeco | 110,588 | 6.63 |
| Nacionalista | Charisse Anne Hernandez (Incumbent) | 110,038 | 6.60 |
| Nacionalista | Maria Virginia Alcasid (Incumbent) | 103,956 | 6.24 |
| PDP–Laban | Pursino Oruga | 103,573 | 6.21 |
| Independent | Soliman Lajara | 103,089 | 6.18 |
| Nacionalista | Angelito Lazaro, Jr. (Incumbent) | 96,215 | 5.77 |
| Nacionalista | Saturnino Lajara (Incumbent) | 95,121 | 5.71 |
| Nacionalista | Dyan Espiridion (Incumbent) | 94,052 | 5.64 |
| PDP–Laban | Leeanne Aldabe | 93,207 | 5.59 |
| Nacionalista | Juan Lazaro (Incumbent) | 88,061 | 5.28 |
| Independent | Joselito Catindig | 85,675 | 5.14 |
| Independent | Doreen May Cabrera | 81,398 | 4.88 |
| Independent | Edison Natividad | 70,252 | 4.21 |
| Independent | Mark Cholo Atienza | 62,798 | 3.77 |
| KDP | Abdiel Balagtas | 61,720 | 3.70 |
| Independent | Pocholo Platon | 58,408 | 3.50 |
| Independent | Jose Morel Manaig | 57,950 | 3.47 |
| KDP | Gerard Teruel | 53,358 | 3.20 |
| Independent | Crystal Joy Espiridion | 39,582 | 2.37 |
| UNA | Alvin Villa | 25,030 | 1.50 |
| Independent | Denica Lapitan | 22,342 | 1.34 |
| Independent | Roosevelt Legaspi | 13,587 | 0.81 |
| Independent | Rhyan Francia | 11,888 | 0.71 |
| Independent | Rodante Narvaez | 10,191 | 0.61 |
| PFP | Vladimir Garcia | 8,931 | 0.53 |
| Independent | Manuel Pelino, Jr. | 4,518 | 0.27 |
| Total votes | | 1,665,528 | 100.00 |
