= Cha Hernandez =

Filipina politician

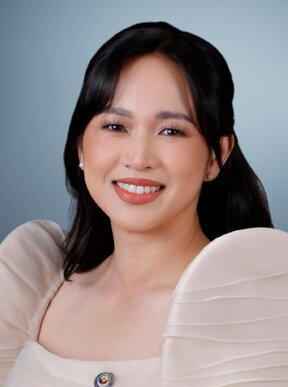
- Official portrait, 2025

Member of the Philippine House of Representatives from Calamba's Lone District
- Incumbent
- Assumed office June 30, 2022
- Preceded by: Jun Chipeco

Member of the Calamba City Council
- In office June 30, 2016 – June 30, 2022

Personal details
- Born: Charisse Anne Claudio Hernandez; September 8, 1993 (age 33) Calamba, Laguna, Philippines
- Party: Lakas (2022–present)
- Other political affiliations: PDP–Laban (2021–2022); Nacionalista (2018–2021); Liberal (2015-2018)
- Spouse: Bengie Alcantara (m. 2020)
- Children: 2
- Education: Colegio de San Juan de Letran Calamba (BSBA)
- Occupation: Politician

Charisse Anne Claudio Hernandez-Alcantara (born September 8, 1993), known as Cha Hernandez, is a Filipina politician who currently serves as Representative from Calamba's lone district since 2022. She previously served as councilor of Calamba from 2016 to 2022. While she shares the same surname as the prominent Hernandez family in Laguna, she is not related to any of them.

== Early life and education ==
Hernandez was born in Calamba, Laguna, Philippines. She completed her higher education at the Colegio de San Juan de Letran Calamba, where she earned a degree in Business Administration.

== Political career ==
Hernandez began her political career as a councilor in Calamba City, serving from 2016 to 2022. In the 2022 elections, she ran for the House of Representatives seat representing Calamba's lone district. Running under the PDP-Laban Party, she won the election against the incumbent mayor, Timmy Chipeco, of the Nacionalista Party, by a margin of 7,407 votes. Her victory in the 2022 elections marked a notable political change in Calamba, as it ended the long-standing leadership of the Chipeco family in the city's politics.

In 2025, she was re-elected by a landslide against former Congressman Joaquin "Jun" Chipeco and veteran Councilor Saturnino "Turne" Lajara.

== Legislative work ==
In 2025, her first bill, proposing the establishment of the Calamba City General Hospital, was enacted into law by the President as Republic Act No. 12208.

- House Bill No. 02360: This bill proposes the establishment of the Calamba City General Hospital to improve healthcare services and accessibility in the city.
- House Bill No. 02361: Aims to expand the Mandatory Basic Immunization Program to include additional vaccines for children and infants, in line with public health goals.
- House Bill No. 02363: Seeks to establish a new campus of the Polytechnic University of the Philippines (PUP) in Calamba, which aims to provide more educational opportunities to local residents.

== Electoral history ==
Electoral history of Cha Hernandez
Year	Office	Party	Votes received				Result
Year	Office	Party	Total	%	P.	Swing	Result
2016	Councilor of Calamba	Liberal	85,122	—N/a	5th	—N/a	Won
2019	Councilor of Calamba	Nacionalista	110,038	6.60%	2nd	—N/a	Won
2022	Representative (Calamba at-large)	PDP–Laban	113,130	50.09%	1st	—N/a	Won
2025	Representative (Calamba at-large)	Lakas	167,282	66.42%	1st	—N/a	Won
