= Calamba's at-large congressional district =

Legislative district of the Philippines

- Constituency for the House of Representatives of the Philippines
- Interactive map of district boundaries
- City: Calamba
- Province: Laguna, Calabarzon
- Population: 539,671 (2020)
- Electorate: 364,766 (2025)
- Major settlements: Calamba
- Area: 149.50 km^{2} (57.72 sq mi)

Current constituency
- Created: 2018
- Representative: Charisse Anne Hernandez
- Political party: Lakas–CMD
- Congressional bloc: Majority

Calamba's at-large congressional district is the congressional district of the Philippines in Calamba. It has been represented in the House of Representatives of the Philippines since 2019. Previously included in Laguna's 2nd congressional district, it includes all barangays of the city. It is currently represented in the 20th Congress by Charisse Anne Hernandez of the Lakas–CMD.

== Representation history ==
#	Member		Term of office		Congress	Party	Electoral history
#	Image	Name (Birth-Death)	Start	End	Congress	Party	Electoral history
District created September 24, 2018.
1		Joaquin M. Chipeco Jr. (born 1942)	June 30, 2019	June 30, 2022	18th	Nacionalista	Redistricted from Laguna's 2nd district and re-elected in 2019.
2		Charisse Anne C. Hernandez (born 1993)	June 30, 2022	Incumbent	19th	PDP–Laban	Elected in 2022.
2		Charisse Anne C. Hernandez (born 1993)	June 30, 2022	Incumbent	19th	Lakas	Elected in 2022.
2		Charisse Anne C. Hernandez (born 1993)	June 30, 2022	Incumbent	20th	Lakas	Re-elected in 2025.

== Election results ==
=== 2025 ===
2025 Philippine House of Representatives election in the Calamba's lone district
Party	Candidate	Votes	%
Lakas	Charisse Anne Hernandez	167,282	66.42%
Nacionalista	Joaquin Chipeco Jr.	39,293	15.60%
PFP	Saturnino Lajara	38,926	15.46%
AKAY	Eugiene Salom	6,356	2.52
Total votes		251,857	100%
Lakas hold			

=== 2022 ===
2022 Philippine House of Representatives election in the Calamba's lone district
Party	Candidate	Votes	%
PDP–Laban	Charisse Anne Hernandez	113,130	50.09
Nacionalista	Justin Marc Chipeco	105,723	46.81
Independent	Emerson Panganiban	6,981	3.09
Valid ballots		225,834	92.13
Invalid or blank votes		19,299	7.87
Total votes		245,133	100.00
PDP–Laban gain from Nacionalista			

=== 2019 ===
2019 Philippine House of Representatives election in the Calamba's lone district
Party	Candidate	Votes	%
Nacionalista	Jun Chipeco Jr.	149,428	100.00
Valid ballots		149,428	76.63
Invalid or blank votes		45,571	23.36
Total votes		194,999	100.00
Nacionalista win (new seat)			

== See also ==
- Legislative district of Calamba
