= Jun Chipeco =

Filipino politician

The Honorable Joaquin Chipeco Jr.

Member of the Philippine House of Representatives from Calamba
- In office June 30, 2019 – June 30, 2022
- Preceded by: District established
- Succeeded by: Charisse Anne Hernandez

Member of the House of Representatives from Laguna's 2nd district
- In office June 30, 2013 – June 30, 2019
- Preceded by: Timmy Chipeco
- Succeeded by: Ruth Mariano-Hernandez
- In office June 30, 1995 – June 30, 2004
- Preceded by: Rodolfo Tingzon
- Succeeded by: Timmy Chipeco
- In office June 30, 1987 – June 30, 1992
- Preceded by: Leonides De Leon
- Succeeded by: Rodolfo Tingzon

22nd Mayor of Calamba
- In office June 30, 2004 – June 30, 2013
- Vice Mayor: Pursino Oruga (2004–2010); Severino Lajara (2010–2013)
- Preceded by: Severino Lajara
- Succeeded by: Timmy Chipeco

Governor of Laguna
- Acting
- In office May 19, 1986 – June 19, 1986
- Governor: Felicismo San Luis

4th Vice Governor of Laguna
- In office March 25, 1986 – March 24, 1987
- Governor: Felicismo San Luis
- Preceded by: Leandro Balquiedra
- Succeeded by: Restituto Luna

Member of the Laguna Provincial Board
- In office December 30, 1971 – March 25, 1986
- Constituency: At-large

Personal details
- Born: August 15, 1942 (age 84) Quiapo, Manila, Philippines
- Party: Nacionalista (until 1978, 2010–2012, since 2018)
- Other political affiliations: Liberal (1987, 2012–2018); Lakas–CMD (2008–2010); KAMPI (2001–2008); LDP (1988–1992, 1995–2001); NPC (1992–1995); PDP–Laban (1987–1988); UNIDO (1986–1987); Independent (1986); KBL (1978–1986)
- Spouse: Nelia San Buenaventura
- Children: 4, including Timmy
- Parent(s): Joaquin E. Chipeco Sr. Remedios Montañano
- Education: University of Santo Tomas (BA); San Beda College (LL.B)
- Occupation: Politician, civic leader, realtor
- Profession: Lawyer

Joaquin Montañano Chipeco Jr., commonly known as Jun Chipeco, is a Filipino lawyer, politician, public administrator, civic leader, and realtor who last served as representative of the Lone District of Calamba from 2019 to 2022. He also served as mayor of Calamba from 2004 to 2013, representative of the 2nd District of Laguna from 1987 to 1992, 1995 to 2004, and 2013 to 2019, vice governor of Laguna from 1986 to 1987, and provincial board member from 1971 to 1986. He greatly contributed to improving education, health, and infrastructure in his city. During his tenure, the city was chosen as the regional development center of the Calabarzon Region. During his term, the City College of Calamba, the new City Hall of Calamba for Mayor Lajara's term, the Pamilihang Panlungsod ng Calamba and the Calamba Recreational and Institutional Complex were established. He is the second member of the Chipeco family involved in politics.

On July 10, 2020, he is one of the 70 representatives who voted to reject the franchise renewal of ABS-CBN. After being term-limited, he ran for a comeback as representative for Calamba in 2025, but lost to his successor Cha Hernandez.

Political offices
Preceded by Leandro Balquiedra	Vice Governor of Laguna; 1986–1987	Succeeded by Restituto Luna
Preceded by Severino Lajara	Mayor of Calamba; 2004–2013	Succeeded by Timmy Chipeco
House of Representatives of the Philippines
Preceded by Leonides De Leon	Member of the House of Representatives from the 2nd District of Laguna; 1987–1992	Succeeded by Rodolfo Tingzon
Preceded by Rodolfo Tingzon	Member of the House of Representatives from the 2nd District of Laguna; 1995–2004	Succeeded by Timmy Chipeco
Preceded by Timmy Chipeco	Member of the House of Representatives from the 2nd District of Laguna; 2013–2019	Succeeded by Ruth Mariano-Hernandez
New district	Member of the House of Representatives from the Lone District of Calamba; 2019–2022	Succeeded by Charisse Anne Hernandez
