= Timmy Chipeco =

Filipino politician

The Honorable Justin Marc Chipeco
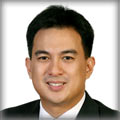
- Official portrait, 2010

23rd Mayor of Calamba
- In office June 30, 2013 – June 30, 2022
- Vice Mayor: Ross Rizal
- Preceded by: Joaquin Chipeco Jr.
- Succeeded by: Ross Rizal

Member of the Philippine House of Representatives from Laguna's 2nd District
- In office June 30, 2004 – June 30, 2013
- Preceded by: Joaquin Chipeco Jr.
- Succeeded by: Joaquin Chipeco Jr.

Personal details
- Born: Justin Marc San Buenaventura Chipeco; April 6, 1975 (age 51) San Juan, Rizal, Philippines
- Party: Nacionalista (2004–2010; 2012–present)
- Other political affiliations: Liberal (2010–2012); LDP (2004)
- Spouse: Laverne Castro (m. 2016)
- Children: 4
- Education: De La Salle University (BS); San Beda College of Law; Arellano University School of Law (LL.B.)
- Profession: Lawyer

Justin Marc San Buenaventura Chipeco (April 6, 1975), more commonly known as Timmy Chipeco, is a Filipino lawyer and politician who last served as city mayor of Calamba, Laguna from 2013 to 2022. He is also a former member of the House of Representatives of the Philippines, representing Laguna's 2nd District. He served this district for three consecutive terms, having first won in 2004, in 2007, and in 2010. He is the son of former Calamba mayor and representative Joaquin Chipeco, Jr.

He attempted a congressional comeback in 2022 for the Lone District of Calamba, but lost to councilor Cha Hernandez. He attempted a mayoral return in 2025 but lost to erstwhile ally and incumbent Roseller Rizal.

== House of Representatives ==
Chipeco served as representative, running under the banner of the Nacionalista Party. He defeated two independent candidates, Rosauro Revilla and Severino Vergara.

Chipeco was the vice chairperson of the Committee on Constitutional Amendments and a Member for the Majority of the Committees on Accounts, Banks and Financial Intermediaries, Housing and Urban Development, Public Works and Highways, and Southern Tagalog Development. He has authored 16 house measures and co-authored 31.

Political offices
Preceded by Joaquin M. Chipeco Jr.	Mayor of Calamba; 2013–2022	Succeeded by Roseller Rizal
House of Representatives of the Philippines
Preceded by Joaquin M. Chipeco, Jr.	Representative, 2nd District of Laguna; 2004–2013	Succeeded by Joaquin M. Chipeco Jr.
