= Ruth Hernandez =

Member of the Philippine House of Representatives from Laguna's 2nd District (born 1974)

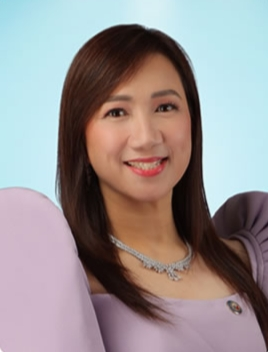
- Official portrait, 2022

Member of the Philippine House of Representatives from Laguna's 2nd District
- In office June 30, 2019 – June 30, 2025
- Preceded by: Jun Chipeco
- Succeeded by: Ramil Hernandez

Member of the Laguna Provincial Board from the 2nd district
- In office June 30, 2016 – June 30, 2019

Member of the Calamba City Council (Calamba Municipal Council (1995–2001)
- In office June 30, 2007 – June 30, 2016
- In office June 30, 1995 – June 30, 2004

Personal details
- Born: Ruth Bayani Mariano; May 16, 1974 (age 52) Quezon City, Philippines
- Party: Lakas–CMD (1995-2007; 2023–present)
- Other political affiliations: Independent (2018–2021); Nacionalista (2009–2018); PDP–Laban (2007–2009; 2021–2023)
- Spouse: Ramil Hernandez (m. 2001)
- Children: 2
- Education: University of the Philippines Los Baños

Ruth Mariano Hernandez (born May 16, 1974) is a Filipina politician and Member of the Philippine House of Representatives of Laguna's 2nd District from 2019 to 2025. She previously served as board member of Laguna from 2016 to 2019 and councilor of Calamba from 1995 to 2004 and from 2007 to 2016. She is married to the former Laguna Governor Ramil Hernandez, with whom she has 2 daughters.

== Political career ==
=== Calamba City Council(1995–2004, 2007–2016) ===
In 1995, she ran as Member of the Calamba Municipal Council and re-elected in 1998 and in 2001. In 2007, she ran again for the said position and re-elected again in 2010 and in 2013.

=== Member Of Laguna Provincial Board From 2nd District ===
In 2016, she ran for Member of the Laguna Provincial Board from the 2nd district.

=== House of Representatives (2019–2025) ===
In 2019, she ran as Member of the Philippine House of Representatives from Laguna's 2nd District and re-elected as congresswoman in 2022.

Hernandez ran for Governor of Laguna in 2025, aiming to replace her term-limited husband, but lost to Sol Aragones.

== Personal life ==
Mariano-Hernandez married Ramil Hernandez, whom she met as a fellow councilor of Calamba, and have two children.

She finished her undergraduate degree in the University of the Philippines Los Baños.

House of Representatives of the Philippines
Preceded by Jun Chipeco	Member of the House of Representatives from Laguna's 2nd district 2019–2025	Succeeded by Ramil Hernandez
