= Laguna (province) =

Province in Calabarzon, Philippines

- Province
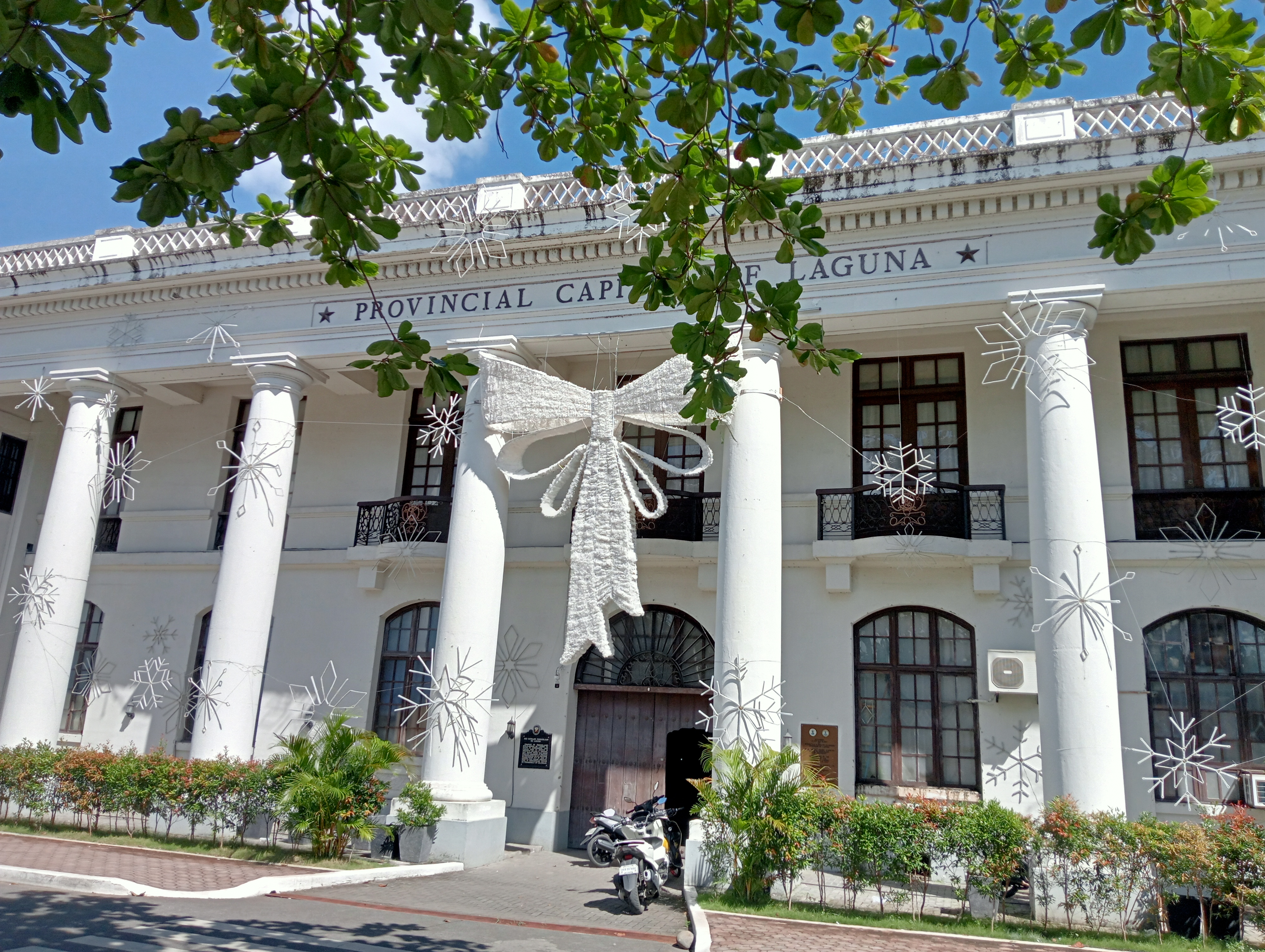
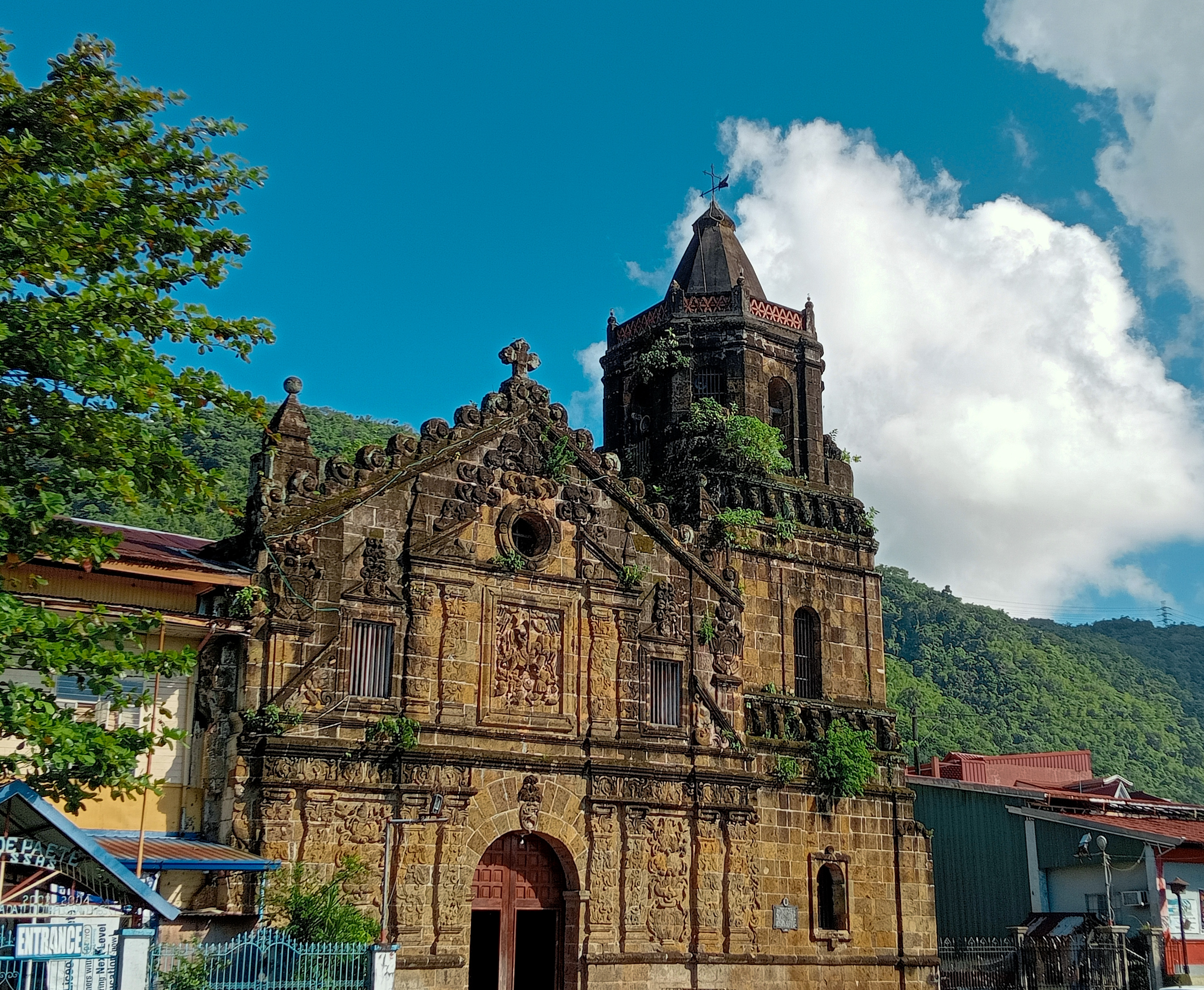
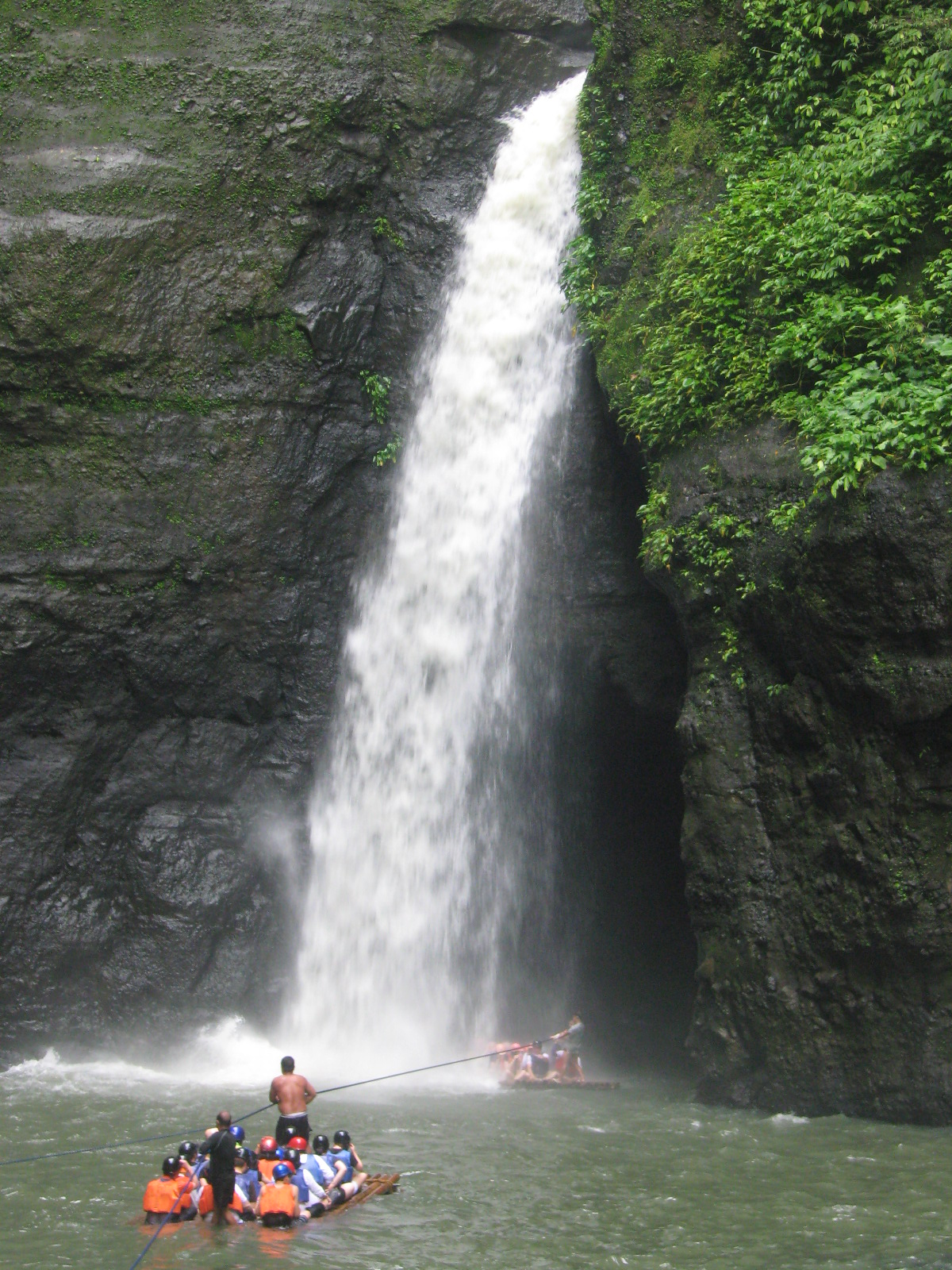
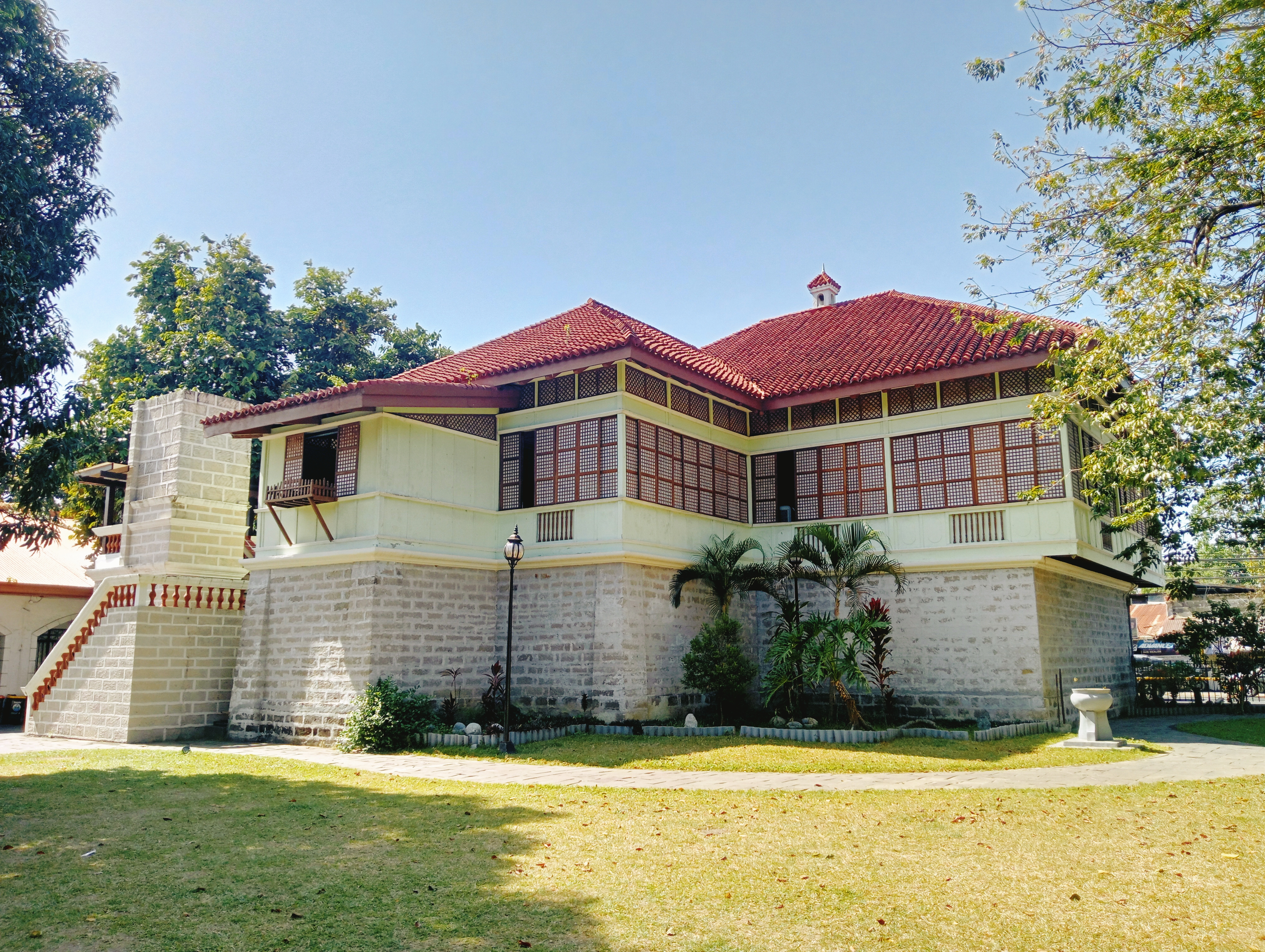
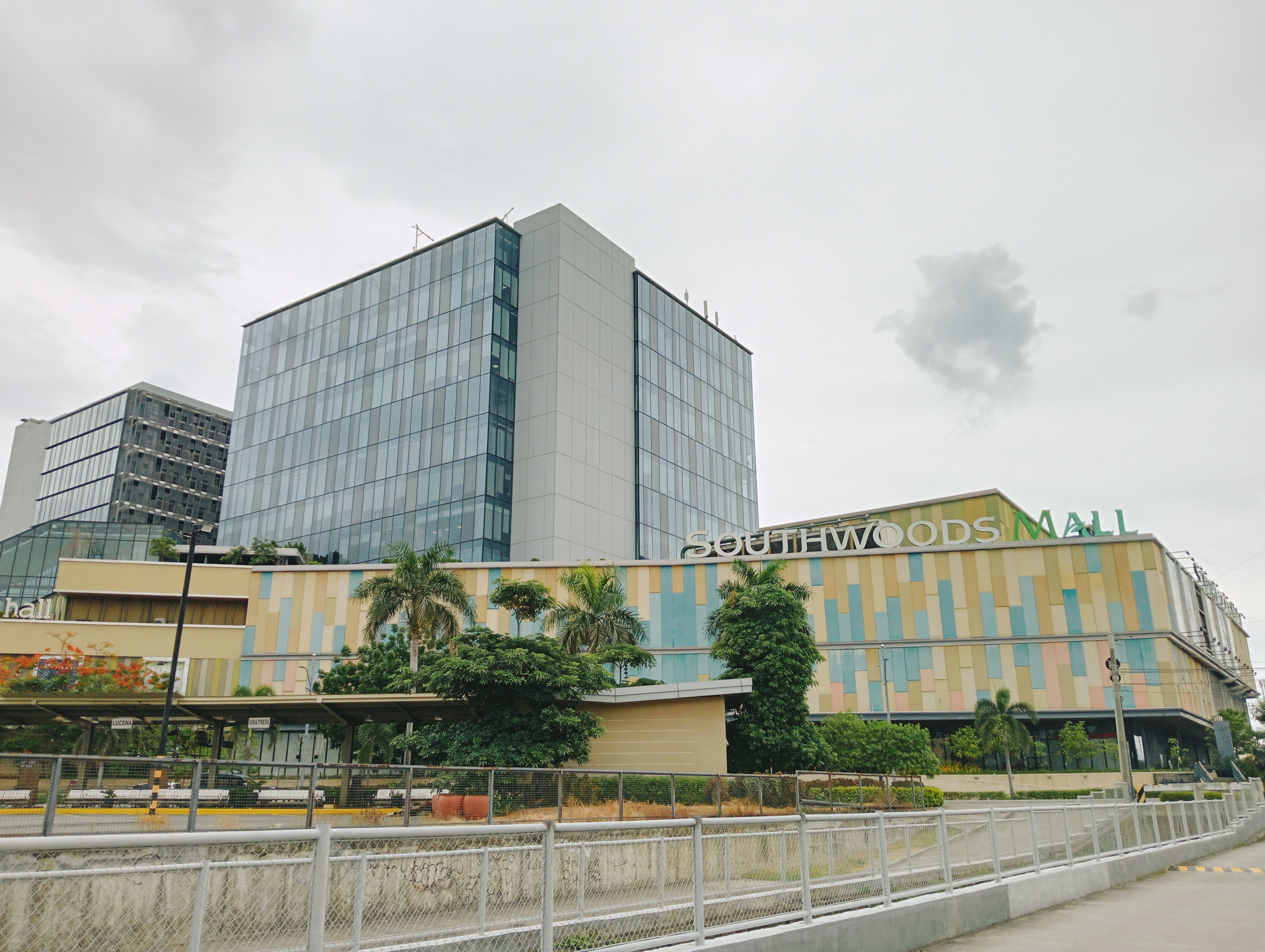
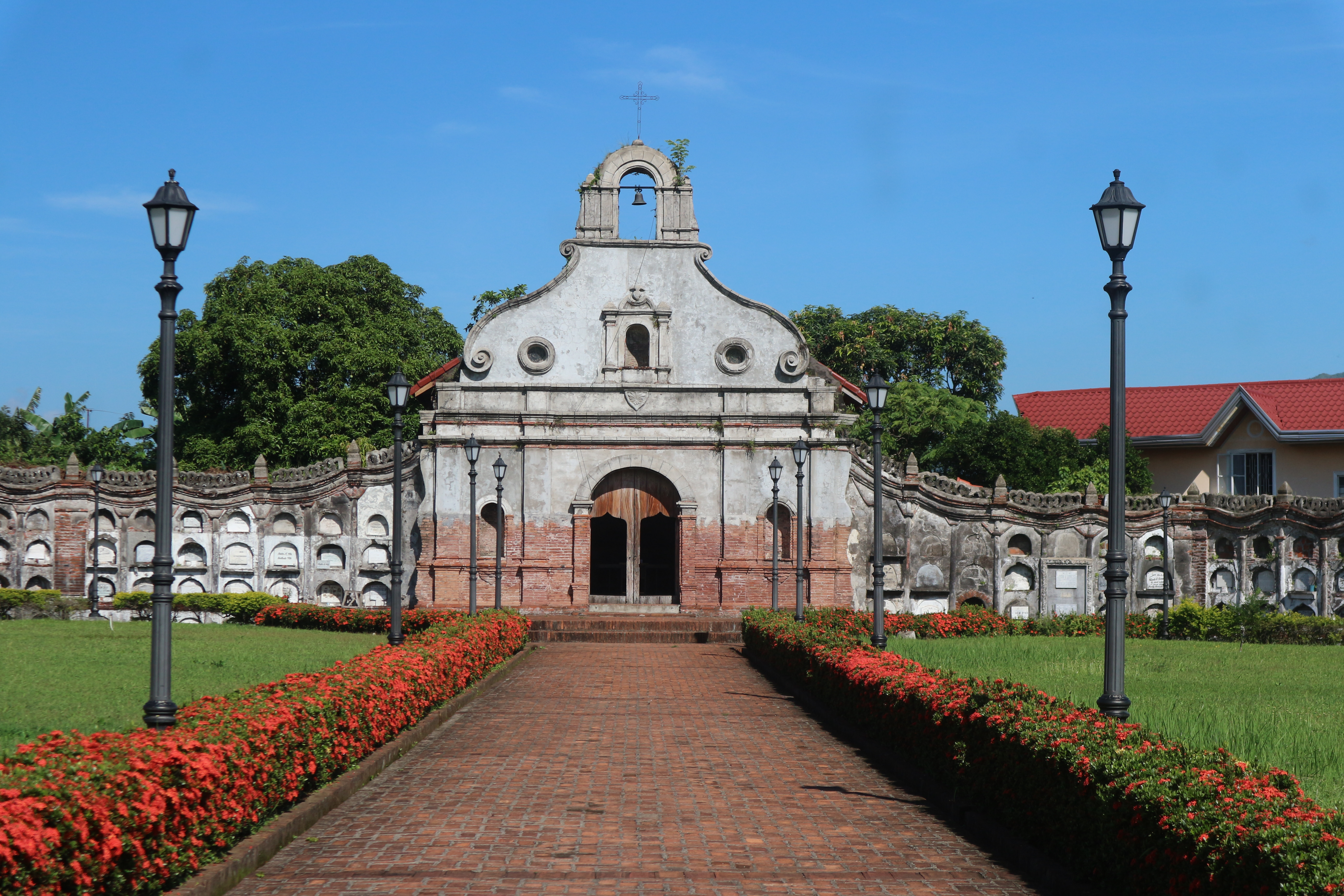
- From left-right, top-bottom: Laguna Provincial Capitol • Paete Church • Pagsanjan Falls • Rizal Shrine • Southwoods Mall • Nagcarlan Underground Cemetery

- Flag Seal
- Motto: "Laban, Laguna!"
- Anthem: Martsa ng Laguna (Laguna March)
- Location in the Philippines
- Interactive map of Laguna
- Coordinates: 14°10′N 121°20′E
- Country: Philippines
- Region: Calabarzon
- Founded: July 28, 1571
- Named for: Laguna de Bay
- Capital: Santa Cruz
- Largest city: San Pablo

Government
  - Governor: Marisol C. Aragones-Sampelo (AKAY)
  - Vice Governor: Magtangol Jose C. Carait III (Lakas)
  - Legislature: Laguna Provincial Board
  - Electorate: 2,140,124 voters (2025)

Area
  - Total: 1,917.85 km^{2} (740.49 sq mi)
  - Rank: 63rd out of 82
- Highest elevation (Mount Banahaw): 2,170 m (7,120 ft)

Population (2024 census)
  - Total: 3,687,345
  - Rank: 3rd out of 82
  - Density: 1,922.65/km^{2} (4,979.63/sq mi)
  - Rank: 3rd out of 82
  - Households: 915,398
- Demonyms: Lagunense; Laguneno

Divisions
  - Independent cities: 0
  - Component cities: 6: Biñan; Cabuyao; Calamba; San Pablo; San Pedro; Santa Rosa
  - Municipalities: 24: Alaminos; Bay; Calauan; Cavinti; Famy; Kalayaan; Liliw; Los Baños; Luisiana; Lumban; Mabitac; Magdalena; Majayjay; Nagcarlan; Paete; Pagsanjan; Pakil; Pangil; Pila; Rizal; Santa Cruz; Santa Maria; Siniloan; Victoria
  - Barangays: 681
  - Districts: Legislative districts of Laguna; Legislative district of Biñan; Legislative district of Calamba; Legislative district of Santa Rosa

Economy
  - Income class: 1st provincial income class
  - Poverty incidence: 5.4% (2023)
  - Revenue: ₱ 5,892 million (2024)
  - Assets: ₱ 14,326 million (2024)
  - Expenditure: ₱ 5,620 million (2024)
  - Liabilities: ₱ 3,011 million (2024)
  - HDI: ▲0.732 (High)
  - HDI rank: 8th (2015)
- Time zone: UTC+8 (PHT)
- PSGC: 043400000
- IDD : area code: +63 (0)49
- ISO 3166 code: PH-LAG
- Ethnic groups: Tagalog (85.8%); Bicolano (4.8%); Bisaya (4.1%)
- Spoken languages: Tagalog; English; Filipino; Hatang Kayi; Ilocano; Bikol
- Website: www.laguna.gov.ph

Laguna [lɐˈɣuː.na], officially the Province of Laguna (Filipino: Lalawigan ng Laguna), is a province in the Philippines located in the Calabarzon region in Luzon. Its capital is Santa Cruz while its largest city is San Pablo. The province is situated southeast of Metro Manila, south of the province of Rizal, west of Quezon, north of Batangas and east of Cavite. Laguna straddles the southern shores of Laguna de Bay, the largest lake in the country. As of the 2024 census, the total population of Laguna is 3,687,345. Among all 82 provinces in the Philippines, Laguna accounted for the largest share (5%) of the national Gross Domestic Product (GDP) with a total of Php 990.69 billion in 2022.

Laguna is notable as the birthplace of José Rizal, the country's de facto national hero. It has numerous natural and cultural attractions such as Cavinti Falls aka Pagsanjan Falls, the University of the Philippines Los Baños and the University of the Philippines Open University in Los Baños, the hot spring resorts of Calamba on the slopes of Mount Makiling, Pila historic town plaza, Taytay Falls in Majayjay, the wood carvings and papier-mâché created by the people of Paete, the annual Sampaguita Festival in San Pedro, the turumba of Pakil, the tsinelas footwear from Liliw, the Pandan Festival of Luisiana, the Pinya Festival of Calauan, the Seven Lakes of San Pablo, and the Nagcarlan Underground Cemetery in Nagcarlan.

Laguna is part of the Greater Manila Area alongside Cavite, Rizal, and Bulacan.

== History ==
=== Early history ===
Pre-Hispanic settlement in the area can be dated to prehistoric times, as evidenced in the names of towns such as Pila, Laguna, whose name can be traced to the straight mounds of dirt that form the boundaries of the rice paddy, or Pilapil. The written history of the province of Laguna, (Lagoon in Spanish) and that of the Southern Tagalog region, dates to 900 AD. The Laguna Copperplate Inscription is the oldest known written document found in the Philippines. It notes that its subject was released from a debt to the Lord of Pailah Jayadewa.

A prominent figure during the time of pre-Hispanic contact is Gat Pangil, a powerful native ruler in the area. The towns of Bay, Pangil and Pakil were reputed to have once been a part of his domain, although accounts vary about his identity.

=== Spanish colonial period ===
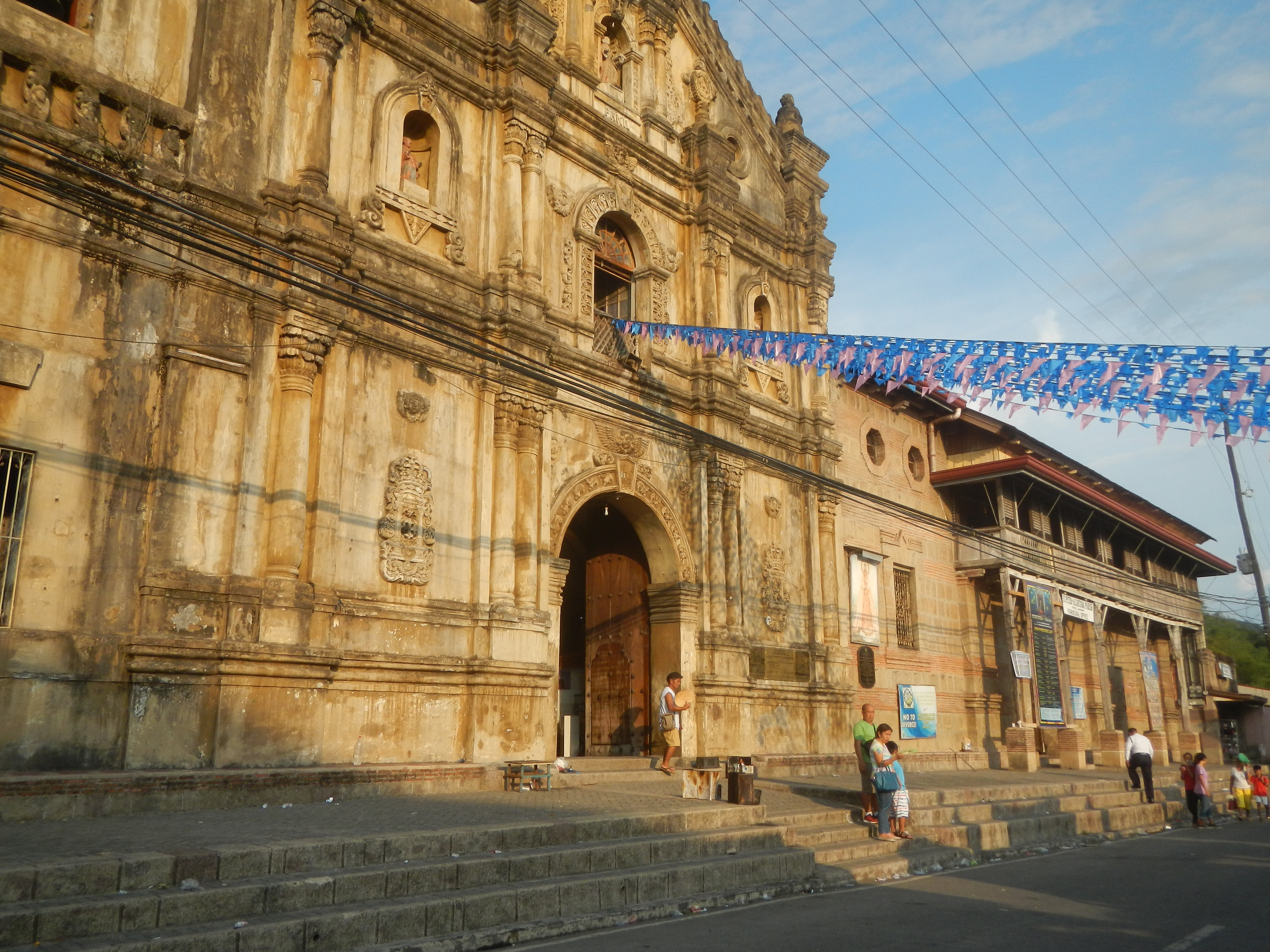
Pakil church

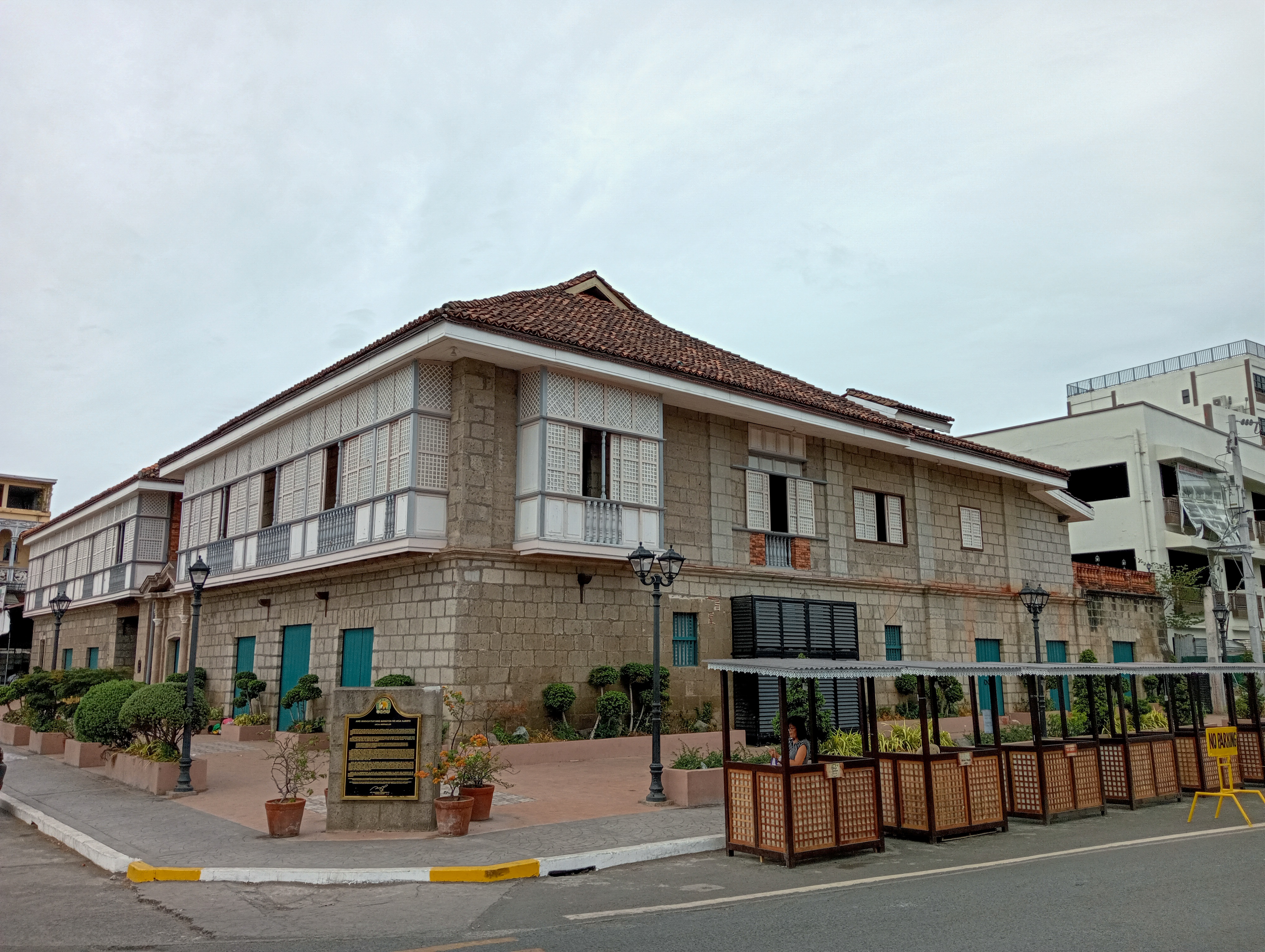
Alberto Mansion, Biñan

The province of Laguna, which was formerly called La Laguna and La Provincia de la Laguna de Bay, was named after Laguna de Bay, the body of water that forms its northern boundary. Laguna de Bay, in turn, was named after the town of Bay, the first provincial capital. Captain Juan de Salcedo with a band of one hundred Spanish-Mexican soldiers conquered the province and its surrounding regions for Spain in 1571. The province of La Laguna comprised the modern province of Laguna, as well as parts of what are now known as Rizal and Quezon provinces. After the conquest; the conquistadors from Spanish-Mexico were given encomiendas and Martín de Goiti was entrusted with rule over Bombon (Laguna de Bay region) with approximately 8,000 tributaries; one of the largest early encomiendas.

In 1577, Spanish Franciscan missionaries arrived in Manila, and in 1578 they started evangelizing Laguna, Morong (now Rizal), Tayabas (now Quezon) and the Bicol Peninsula as part of the colonizing effort. Juan de Plasencia and Diego de Oropesa were the earliest Franciscans sent to these places. From 1580, the towns of Bay, Caliraya, Majayjay, Nagcarlan, Liliw, Pila, Santa Cruz, Lumban, Pangil and Siniloan were founded. During the time of Governor-General Gómez Pérez Dasmariñas, the province of La Laguna was divided into the following encomiendas:

- Maribago – Currently the area of Balibago in Santa Rosa
- Tabuco – Currently the areas surrounding San Pedro, Biñan, Santa Rosa, Cabuyao, and Calamba
- Taitay – Currently Taytay, Rizal
- Bay – The area surrounding Bay, Laguna, and Los Baños, Laguna
- Pila – The area that is now Pila, Victoria, Pililla, and Jalajala, Rizal
- Mahaihai – Currently the area around Majayjay, Magdalena, and Luisiana
- Lumbang – The largest encomienda, containing what is now known as Lumban, Santa Cruz, Paete, Pakil, Cavinti, and Pagsanjan
- Tayaval – Tayabas, now known as Quezon province
- Panguil – Now Pangil
- Sinaloa – The area surrounding Siniloan, Famy and Mabitac
- Morong – Currently the areas surrounding Morong, including the town of Santa Maria, formerly known as Caboan
- Nayun – Nayum, currently Tiaong, Quezon

By 1591, there were approximately 48,400 people living in the province.

Laguna was the site of multiple engagements during the Sangley Rebellion, made up of Chinese-Filipino mestizos. In 1603, Antonio de Morga relates how the Chinese rebels scattered to three divisions, one of which went to the mountains of San Pablo. Captain Don Luys de Velasco, aided by Spanish and Filipino forces, was successful in pursuing the rebels. Eventually the Chinese were able to kill Luys de Velasco and ten of his men, before securing themselves in San Pablo while waiting for reinforcement from the mainland. On October 20, 1603, Governor-General Pedro Bravo de Acuña then sent Captain Cristoval de Axqueta Menchaca to pursue and crush the rebellion and was successful after twenty days of fighting.

Around this time the hot springs of Los Baños and San Pablo were known to the Spanish, and a hospital was built in the area. By 1622, the hospital was notable enough to be mentioned by the Archbishop of Manila at the time, Miguel García Serrano in his letter to King Philip IV.

In 1639, a second rebellion involving the Chinese occurred, and the rebels fortified themselves in the highlands of Cavinti and Lumban before surrendering in Pagsanjan a year later.

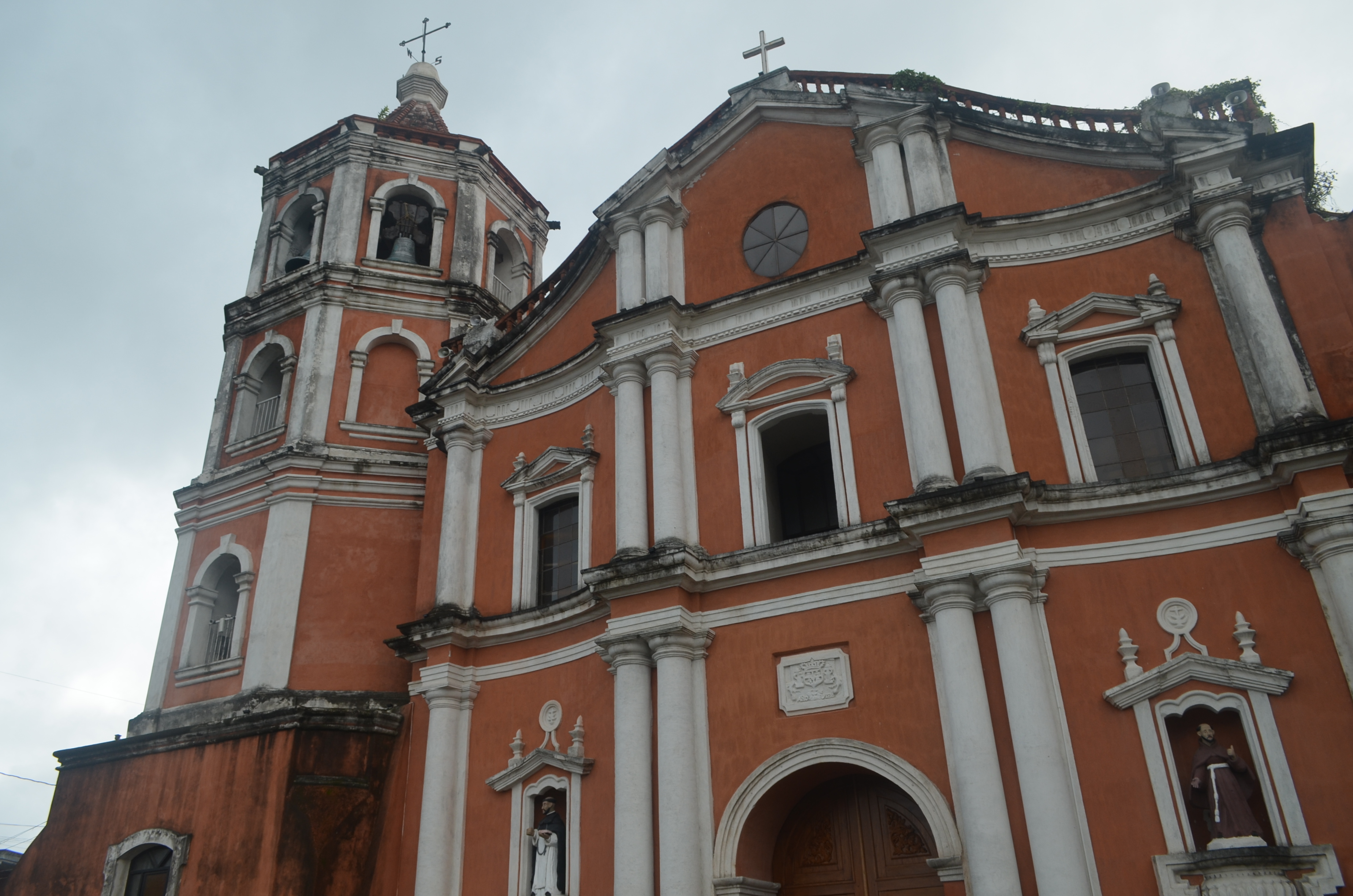
Facade of the Cathedral Parish of Saint Paul the Hermit, San Pablo City

In 1670, a delimitation of borders were made between Lucban, Majayjay and Cavite. The most populous town at that time, Bay, was capital of the province until 1688, when the seat of the provincial government was moved to Pagsanján. Pagsanján would be the provincial seat until 1858 when it was moved once again to Santa Cruz. In 1754, the province of Laguna and Tayabas were divided, with the Malinao River separating the towns of Majayjay and Lucban.

In 1678, Fray Hernando Cabrera founded San Pablo de los Montes (now San Pablo City) and built a wooden church and convent considered as the best and finest in the province.

Fighting extended to Laguna during the British occupation of Manila between the years of 1762–64. A detachment of British troops under Captain Thomas Backhouse entered the province in search of the silver cargo of the galleon Filipina while Francisco de San Juan led a band of volunteers that fought them in several engagements in and around the then provincial capital of Pagsanjan. Backhouse plundered the town and burned its newly reconstructed church but San Juan succeeded in escaping with the precious hoard to Pampanga where the treasure greatly bolstered the defense effort of Governor-General Simón de Anda y Salazar. For his actions, San Juan was made a brigade commander and alcalde mayor of Tayabas (now Quezon) province.

In 1774, authorities from Bulacan, Tondo, Laguna Bay, and other areas surrounding Manila reported with consternation that discharged soldiers and deserters (from Mexico, Spain and Peru) were providing Indios military training for the weapons that had been disseminated all over the territory during the British war.

By the end of the 1700s, Laguna was a major province of 14,392 native families and 336 Spanish Filipino Mestizo families. There were also 2,000 Chinese-Filipino farmers/families.

By 1818, the census recorded that fresh new numbers of Spanish-Filipino families resided in the following areas of Laguna: 2 at Angono, 3 at Baras, 2 at San Pedro Tunasan, 8 at Biñan, 4 at Calamba, 3 at Piyla, 2 at Calauang, 3 at Mavitao, and 7 at Pagsanjan.

A major event in Laguna occurred in 1840, when religious intolerance led the people of Majayjay, Nagcarlan, Bay, and Biñan to join the revolt of Hermano Pule (Apolinario de la Cruz) of Lucban, Tayabas. This revolt was eventually crushed by Governor-General Marcelino de Oraá Lecumberri.

As part of political restructuring during the 19th century, the municipalities of Morong, Pililla, Tanay, Baras, Binangonan, Jalajala, Angono and Cardona were separated from Laguna and re-organized to the province Politico-Militar Distrito de Morong. In 1858, the provincial capital was once again moved from Pagsanjan to Santa Cruz, where it stands until today.

In 1861, José Rizal was born in Calamba to Francisco Mercado and Teodora Alonso. Rizal would become one of the leading members of the Propaganda Movement, who advocated political reforms for the colony. Rizal would go on to write two novels, Noli Me Tángere and El filibusterismo, which in part fueled additional anti-colonial sentiment, contributing to the eventual Philippine Revolution. In 1896, thousands of inhabitants, especially of Bay, Los Baños, Nagcarlan, Magdalena, Santa Cruz, and Pagsanjan had joined the revolutionary Katipunan. Rizal was executed on December 30, 1896, on charges of rebellion. Today, Rizal is recognized as a national hero of the Philippines.

=== Philippine Revolution ===
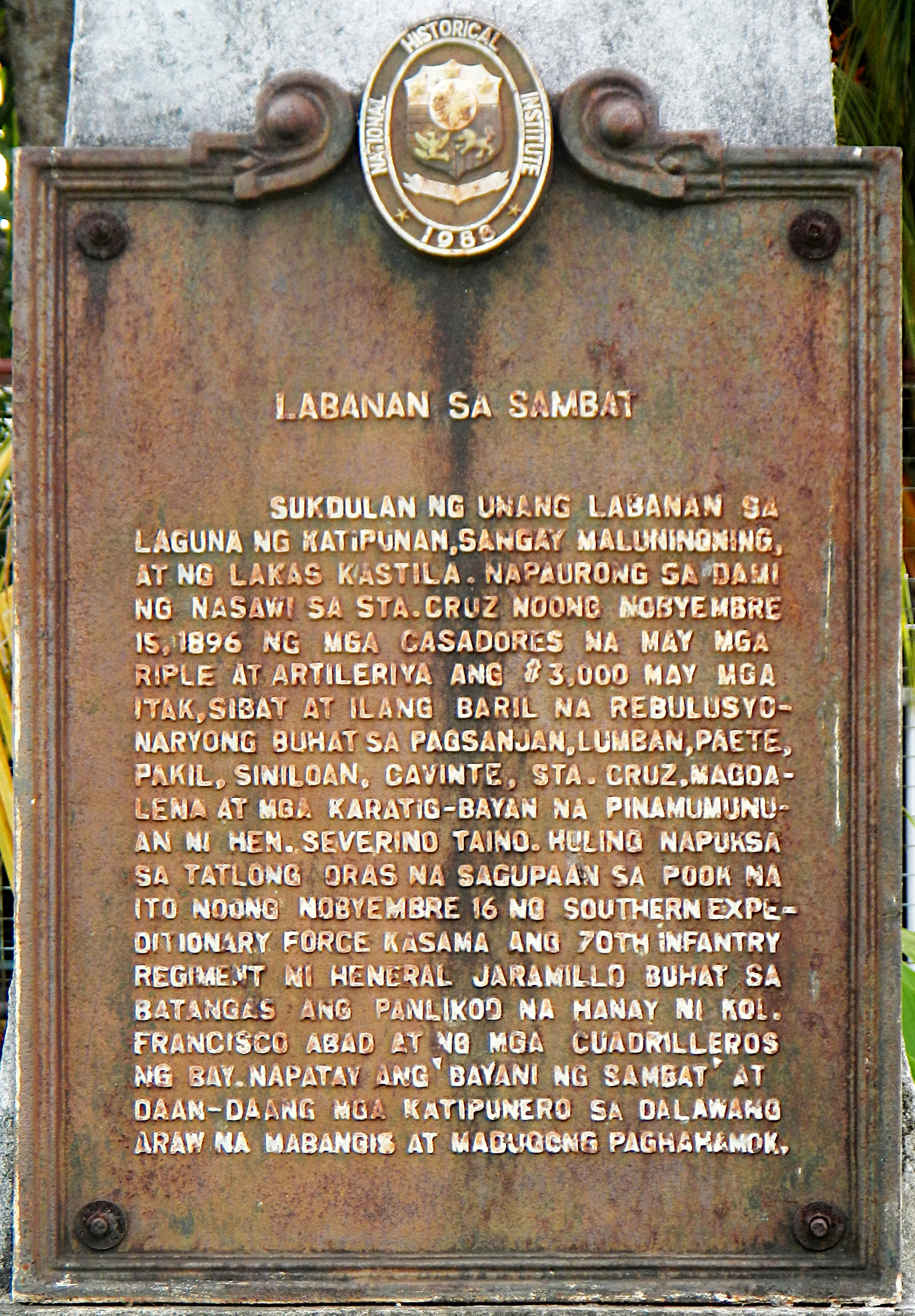
Historical marker of the Battle of Sambat, Pagsanjan, Laguna

Laguna was one of the eight provinces to rise in revolt against the Spanish misrule led by Generals Paciano Rizal in Calamba, Severino Taiño in Pagsanjan, Agueda Kahabagan in Calauan, and Miguel Malvar in Batangas. Emilio Jacinto, known as the "brains of the Katipunan", also led forces in the province at the time.

One of the early engagements of the revolution was the Battle of Sambat, in Pagsanjan. Katipuneros from Laguna, led by Severino Taiño, took the city of Pagsanjan and attempted to use it as a starting point towards the liberation of the province, but was quelled by forces led by Basilio Augustín.

The defeat in Sambat meant the end of large-scale organized revolt in Laguna, the Malungingnging chapter of the Katipunan failing to replicate the relative success of the revolution in Cavite. The revolutionaries resorted to hit-and-run and guerrilla tactics against the Spanish, lasting until the Pact of Biak-na-Bato on December 14 to 15, 1897.

Some revolutionaries continued the armed struggle after the Pact of Biak-na-Bato in refusal of Emilio Aguinaldo's orders. Jacinto led a battle against Spanish troops in Magdalena in February 1898, but had to retreat after being shot in the hip. Jacinto would take refuge at the nearby church but was then arrested and jailed in Santa Cruz. Jacinto would escape by pretending to be a double agent for the Spanish, but would eventually contract malaria and die in April 1899. Pio del Pilar and Paciano Rizal led revolutionary troops to victory in the Battle of Calamba in May 1898, and the surrender of the last Spanish garrison in Laguna in Santa Cruz, on August 31 of the same year.

Laguna actively supported the First Philippine Republic proclaimed at Malolos on January 23, 1899. Its two delegates to the Malolos Congress were Don Higino Benítez and Don Graciano Cordero, both natives of Pagsanján.

=== American colonial period ===
On the outbreak of the Philippine–American War, Generals Juan Cailles and Paciano Rizal led the defense of Laguna during the war's early stages. The Battle of Mabitac was fought in defense of the town of Mabitac and was won by Filipino forces. However, forces led by Henry W. Lawton fought and won in Santa Cruz, Pagsanjan, and Paete, effectively securing the province for American forces.

By the end of the war, the entire country was occupied by American forces and was taken as a colony. The Taft Commission was established to govern the Philippines during the interim period, which appointed Juan Cailles as the provincial governor of Laguna. Act No. 83, or the Provincial Government Act, established a civilian government under American occupation. During this time, roads were built, schools were established, and in 1917, the Manila Railroad Company extended its line to Laguna as far as Pagsanjan.

In 1903, the town of Muntinlupa became part of La Laguna and was annexed to the town of Biñan, but was later returned to the province of Rizal in 1905.

Resistance against the American occupation continued in Laguna. Teodoro Asedillo organized peasants in Longos, Cavinti, Paete, and Sampaloc in Tayabas province under the Katipunan ng mga Anak-Pawis sa Pilipinas, a labor federation opposed to American colonization. Asedillo became a local legend in the area as a Robin Hood figure. A manhunt on Asedillo began in November 1935, eventually leading to his capture and execution.

On May 2, 1935, members of the Sakdalista party in Cabuyao and nearby towns took over the municipal hall and church as part of a general uprising with the main goal of achieving immediate independence from the United States. Led by Salud Algabre, approximately 300 Sakdalistas occupied the town hall and church of Cabuyao. The uprising was quelled the next day after members of the Philippine Constabulary led by Governor Cailles clamped down on the Sakdalistas. 50 Sakdalistas were killed with 22 suffering injuries.

=== Japanese occupation during the Second World War ===
During the Japanese occupation of the Philippines (1942–1945), Laguna was a center of Filipino resistance despite the presence of Makapili collaborators.

Marking's Guerrillas raided the Cine Lumban in Laguna in June 1942 in an attempt to free the 115 American POWs. Only one American was rescued, Corporal George Lightman of the 3rd Pursuit Squadron, because the ranking American captain ordered his men to stay where they were. The Japanese executed 10 American prisoners in retribution.

The establishment of the military general headquarters and military camp bases of the Philippine Commonwealth Army and the Philippine Constabulary is a military unit organization was founded on January 3, 1942, to June 30, 1946, in the province of Laguna, and aided of the local military regular units of the Philippine Commonwealth Army 4th and 42nd Infantry Division and the Philippine Constabulary 4th Constabulary Regiment. Started the engagements of the Anti-Japanese Military Operations in Southern Luzon, Mindoro and Palawan from 1942 to 1945 against the Japanese Imperial forces.

Beginning in 1945, attacks by the Filipino soldiers of the 4th, 42nd, 43rd, 45th, 46th and 47th Infantry Division of the Philippine Commonwealth Army, 4th Constabulary Regiment of the Philippine Constabulary and the recognized guerrillas against Japanese forces in Laguna increased in anticipation of the Liberation of the Philippines by joint Filipino & American forces.

=== The postwar era ===
==== Establishment of the International Rice Research Institute ====
The International Rice Research Institute was established in 1960, during the presidency of Carlos P. Garcia, and a site in Los Baños was selected to be its headquarters. By 1962 during the presidency of Diosdado Macapagal, IRRI had begun research to develop the new high yield "Miracle Rice" (IR8) variety. Enhanced by the extensive use of chemical fertilizers, IR8 would serve as the foundation for the brief success of the Philippine Government's Masagana 99 agricultural program during the 1970s, although the program would fail in the 1980s mostly because of the Marcos administration's credit scheme did not work.

=== Martial law era ===
The social unrest which arose when Ferdinand Marcos' debt-driven campaign spending led to the 1969 Philippine balance of payments crisis spread beyond the capital and also triggered protests by students in Laguna, especially UP Los Baños. When martial law was declared in September 1972, Marcos cracked down on any form of criticism or activism, leading to the arrest of many of Laguna citizens. Among those who experienced arrest and torture during martial law were Dr. Aloysius Baes, while among those who became desaparecidos were Tish Ladlad, Cristina Catalla, Gerardo "Gerry" Faustino, Rizalina Ilagan, Ramon Jasul, Professor Jessica Sales, and Philippine Council for Agricultural Research and Resource Development artist-illustrator Manuel Ontong. Among those confirmed to have been martyred for their beliefs were Modesto "Bong" Sison, and Manuel Bautista. Camp Vicente Lim in the Canlubang district of Calamba was among the many sites where prisons were put up to contain detainees who dared to criticize the Marcos administration.

Laguna has been the victim of perennial flooding along the south and eastern coasts of Laguna de Bay due to the 1977 cancellation of the Parañaque spillway project. The spillway had been the second part of a plan to reduce flooding on the lakeshore towns of Metro Manila in the 1970s, but the various economic crises of the 1970s led to a lack of budget, which meant that only the Manggahan Floodway in Rizal province was built. The Floodway drew waters away from the Metro Manila lakeshore towns, but dumped them on to the lake. The cancellation of the Parañaque spillway meant that there was no way for the water levels of the lake to be reduced in turn. Within the first year of Manggahan Floodway's completion in 1986, Laguna was hit by an unusual large flood which lasted for 2 months and resulted in high mortality and morbidity rates due to gastroenteritis and other water-borne diseases.

== Geography ==
Laguna covers a total area of 1,917.85 km^{2} (740.49 sq mi) occupying the north‑central section of the Calabarzon region in Luzon. The province is situated southeast of Metro Manila, south of Rizal province, west of Quezon, north of Batangas and east of Cavite. Laguna is the third largest province in the Calabarzon region and the 63rd largest in the entire country. The municipalities of Cavinti and the city of San Pablo have the largest land areas with 203.58 km^{2} (78.60 sq mi) and 197.56 km^{2} (76.28 sq mi), respectively. The municipality of Victoria has the smallest land area with 57.46 km^{2} (22.19 sq mi).

Laguna lies on the southern shores of Laguna de Bay, the largest lake in the country. The land near Laguna de Bay can be considered to be narrow and flat, while become more rugged going further inland towards the mountainous areas of Sierra Madre, Mount Makiling, and Mount Banahaw.

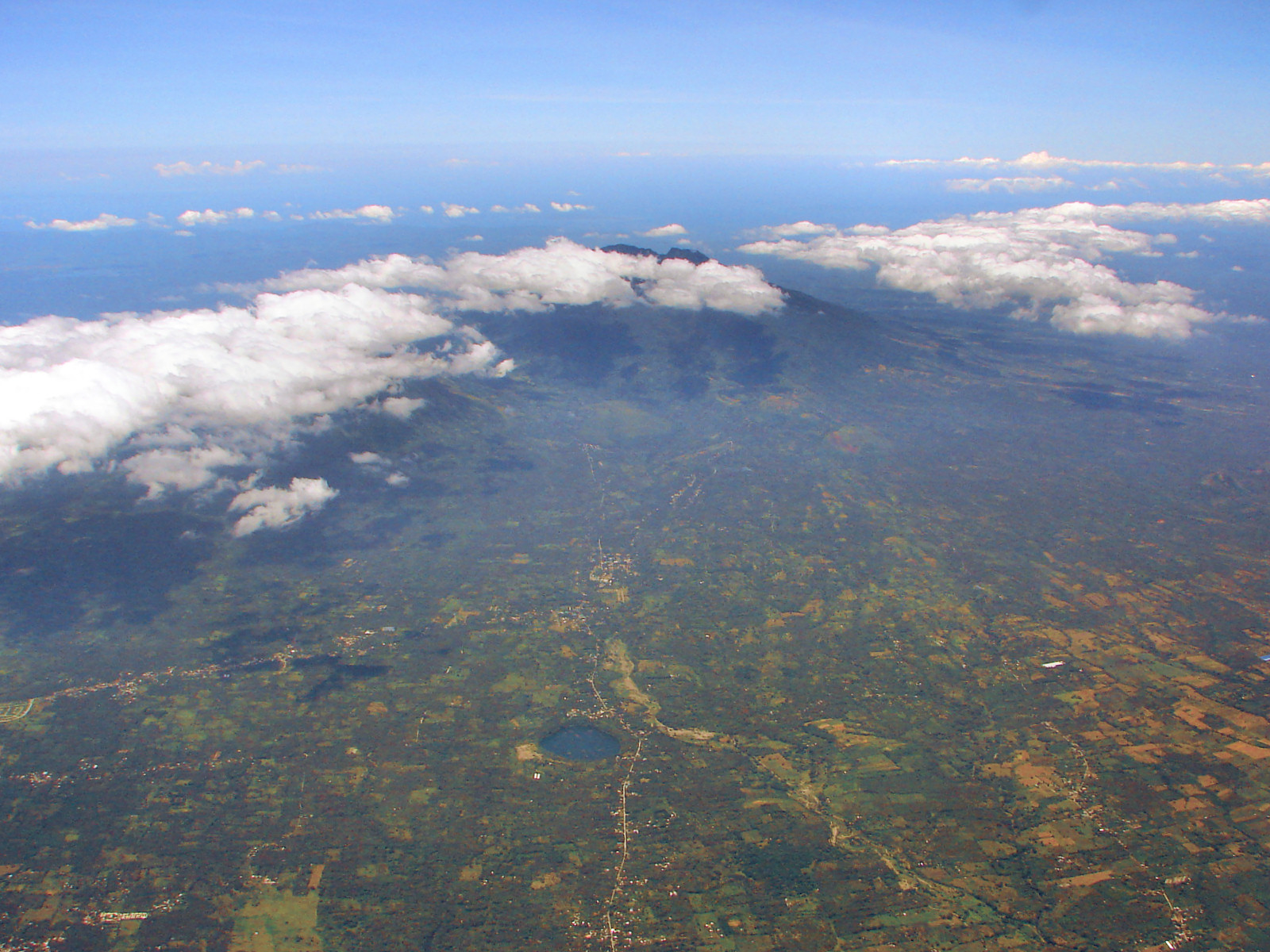
Aerial view of Mount Banahaw

Laguna is home to 24 mountains, most of which are inactive volcanoes. The highest peak in Laguna is Mt. Banahaw, with an elevation of 2,170 m (7,120 ft). Banahaw, unlike most other volcanoes in Laguna, is an active complex stratovolcano, which last erupted in 1843. Banahaw is located in the boundary of Laguna and Quezon and is home to multiple hot springs. Laguna is also home to the Laguna Volcanic Field, which can be found near San Pablo. The Laguna Volcanic Field is composed of over 200 dormant and monogenetic maars, crater lakes, scoria cones and stratovolcanoes, the tallest of which is Mount Makiling at 1,090 m (3,580 ft) in elevation.

San Pablo itself is known for its seven crater lakes, the largest of which is Lake Sampaloc. Apart from Laguna de Bay and the Seven Lakes of San Pablo, there are also two reservoir lakes that can be found in Laguna, the Lake Caliraya and Lumot Lake. These two man-made lakes were formed by the creation of the Caliraya Dam and the Lumot Dam.

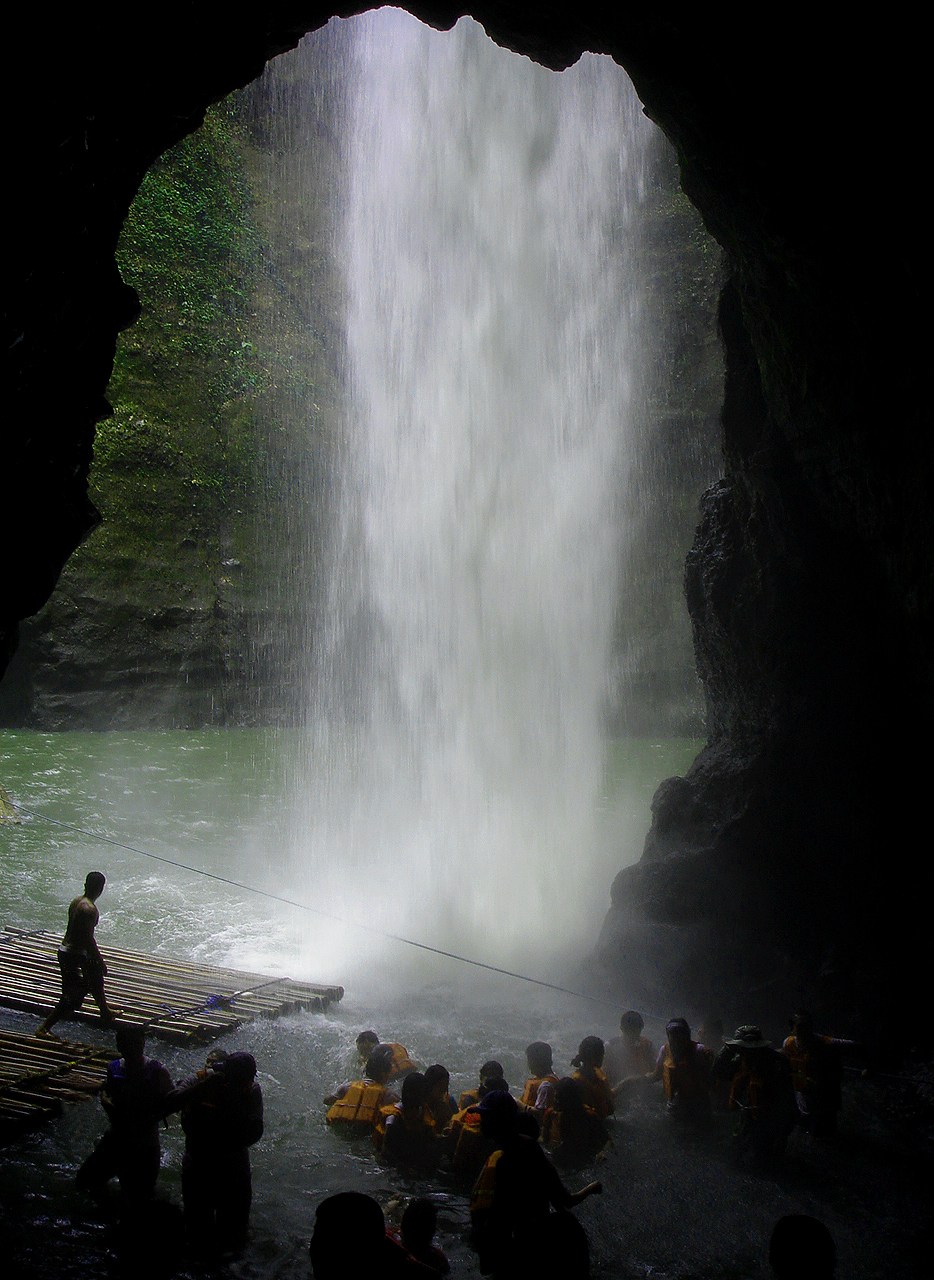
View of Pagsanjan Falls from inside the Devil's Cave

Due to its proximity to Laguna de Bay, Laguna is home to a large number of its tributaries. One of the most famous rivers in Laguna is the Bumbungan River, also known as the Pagsanjan River, named after the town of Pagsanjan and its falls. The Cavinti Falls, also known as Pagsanjan Falls, lie at the end of the river. The Cavinti Falls are a three-drop waterfall with a longest drop of 120 m (390 ft).

Laguna has 60,624 ha (606.24 km^{2}) of alienable and disposable agricultural land, mostly found near the low-lying areas. Around 41,253 ha (412.53 km^{2}), or 23.44% of Laguna's total land area is forest land, situated near Mount Makiling and further south towards Quezon. Laguna has an estimated 16,205 ha (162.05 km^{2}) of forest cover, ranking it third in the region.

=== Climate ===
The province is relatively dry from November to April and wet during the rest of the year for a small portion near the southern boundary. The other parts, west of Santa Cruz municipality, experience a dry season from November to April and rainy season during the rest of the year. The eastern and southernmost portions do not have distinct season, with rainfall more evenly distributed throughout the year. Laguna is classified under the Köppen climate classification as predominantly having a Tropical monsoon climate, mostly centered around the areas of Calamba to Calauan. The area stretching from Biñan to Cabuyao is classified as having a Tropical savanna climate, while the area from Luisiana to Pangil has a tropical rainforest climate.

== Administrative divisions ==
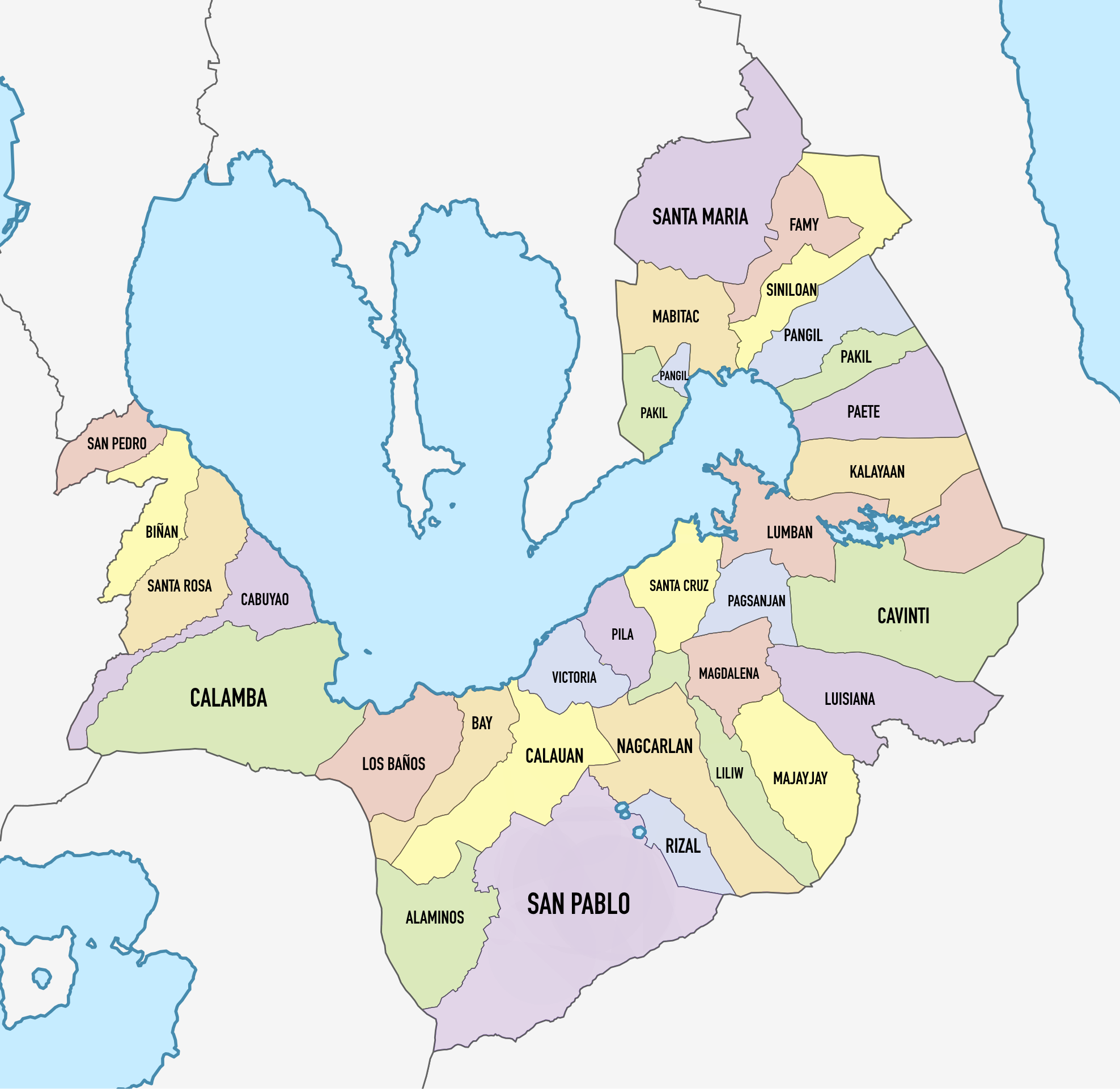
Political map of Laguna

Laguna comprises 24 municipalities and 6 cities. The provincial capital of Laguna is Santa Cruz. As of the 2024 census, there are 3,687,345 people in the province.

The province is divided into four parts. The northwestern half consists of the component cities of San Pedro, Biñan, Santa Rosa, Cabuyao, and Calamba. The northeastern half is made up of the municipalities of Santa Maria, Mabitac, Famy, Siniloan, Pangil, Pakil, Paete, Kalayaan, and Lumban. The western half includes the municipalities of Los Baños, Bay, Calauan, Alaminos, and the component city of San Pablo. The eastern half is composed of the municipalities of Victoria, Pila, Santa Cruz (the capital), Rizal, Nagcarlan, Liliw, Magdalena, Majayjay, Pagsanjan, Luisiana, and Cavinti. Much of the population is concentrated in the northwestern and western halves of the province.

- † Capital municipality
- ∗ Component city
- Municipality

| City or municipality | | District | Population | | | ±% p.a. | Area | | Density | | Barangay | Coordinates^{[A]} |
| | | | (2024) | | (2020) | | km^{2} | sq mi | /km^{2} | /sq mi | | |
|---|---|---|---|---|---|---|---|---|---|---|---|---|
| Alaminos | | 3rd | 1.5% | 53,589 | 51,619 | 0.88% | 57.46 | 22.19 | 930 | 2,400 | 15 | 14°03′41″N 121°14′52″E |
| Bay | | 2nd | 1.9% | 69,802 | 67,182 | 0.90% | 42.66 | 16.47 | 1,600 | 4,100 | 15 | 14°10′48″N 121°16′48″E |
| Biñan | ∗ | Lone | 15.9% | 584,479 | 407,437 | 8.86% | 40.27 | 15.55 | 15,000 | 39,000 | 24 | 14°20′14″N 121°04′58″E |
| Cabuyao | ∗ | 2nd | 9.9% | 365,202 | 355,330 | 0.65% | 43.30 | 16.72 | 8,400 | 22,000 | 18 | 14°16′37″N 121°07′24″E |
| Calamba | ∗ | Lone | 15.6% | 575,046 | 539,671 | 1.50% | 149.50 | 57.72 | 3,800 | 9,800 | 54 | 14°12′38″N 121°09′50″E |
| Calauan | | 3rd | 2.4% | 89,670 | 87,693 | 0.53% | 77.85 | 30.06 | 1,200 | 3,100 | 17 | 14°08′55″N 121°18′57″E |
| Cavinti | | 4th | 0.7% | 24,740 | 23,980 | 0.74% | 203.58 | 78.60 | 120 | 310 | 19 | 14°14′43″N 121°30′28″E |
| Famy | | 4th | 0.5% | 17,668 | 16,791 | 1.20% | 53.06 | 20.49 | 330 | 850 | 20 | 14°26′24″N 121°26′50″E |
| Kalayaan | | 4th | 0.7% | 25,243 | 24,755 | 0.46% | 46.60 | 17.99 | 540 | 1,400 | 3 | 14°19′34″N 121°28′41″E |
| Liliw | | 3rd | 1.1% | 39,976 | 39,491 | 0.29% | 39.10 | 15.10 | 1,000 | 2,600 | 33 | 14°07′51″N 121°26′11″E |
| Los Baños^{[1]} | | 2nd | 3.2% | 117,030 | 115,353 | 0.34% | 54.22 | 20.93 | 2,200 | 5,700 | 14 | 14°10′39″N 121°13′17″E |
| Luisiana | | 4th | 0.6% | 21,824 | 20,859 | 1.07% | 73.31 | 28.31 | 300 | 780 | 23 | 14°11′06″N 121°30′34″E |
| Lumban | | 4th | 0.9% | 32,793 | 33,330 | 0.33% | 40.53 | 15.65 | 810 | 2,100 | 16 | 14°17′51″N 121°27′32″E |
| Mabitac | | 4th | 0.6% | 21,748 | 21,275 | 0.52% | 80.76 | 31.18 | 270 | 700 | 15 | 14°25′38″N 121°25′35″E |
| Magdalena | | 4th | 0.8% | 28,131 | 27,816 | 0.27% | 35.00 | 13.51 | 800 | 2,100 | 24 | 14°11′59″N 121°25′45″E |
| Majayjay | | 4th | 0.8% | 28,504 | 27,893 | 0.51% | 69.58 | 26.86 | 410 | 1,100 | 40 | 14°08′44″N 121°28′21″E |
| Nagcarlan | | 3rd | 1.8% | 66,351 | 64,866 | 0.53% | 78.10 | 30.15 | 850 | 2,200 | 52 | 14°08′11″N 121°24′46″E |
| Paete | | 4th | 0.7% | 25,254 | 24,945 | 0.29% | 55.02 | 21.24 | 460 | 1,200 | 9 | 14°21′51″N 121°28′53″E |
| Pagsanjan | | 4th | 1.2% | 45,602 | 44,325 | 0.67% | 27.40 | 10.58 | 1,700 | 4,400 | 16 | 14°16′22″N 121°27′14″E |
| Pakil | | 4th | 0.7% | 23,972 | 23,495 | 0.47% | 46.50 | 17.95 | 520 | 1,300 | 13 | 14°22′51″N 121°28′43″E |
| Pangil | | 4th | 0.7% | 25,318 | 25,025 | 0.27% | 45.03 | 17.39 | 560 | 1,500 | 8 | 14°24′10″N 121°28′04″E |
| Pila | | 4th | 1.6% | 57,776 | 54,613 | 1.33% | 31.20 | 12.05 | 1,900 | 4,900 | 17 | 14°14′15″N 121°21′42″E |
| Rizal | | 3rd | 0.5% | 18,864 | 18,332 | 0.68% | 27.90 | 10.77 | 680 | 1,800 | 11 | 14°06′50″N 121°23′36″E |
| San Pablo | ∗ | 3rd | 8.1% | 300,166 | 285,338 | 1.20% | 197.56 | 76.28 | 1,500 | 3,900 | 80 | 14°04′12″N 121°19′32″E |
| San Pedro | ∗ | 1st | 9.5% | 348,968 | 326,001 | 1.61% | 24.05 | 9.29 | 15,000 | 39,000 | 27 | 14°21′43″N 121°03′27″E |
| Santa Cruz | † | 4th | 3.4% | 126,844 | 123,574 | 0.62% | 38.59 | 14.90 | 3,300 | 8,500 | 26 | 14°17′07″N 121°24′48″E |
| Santa Maria | | 4th | 0.9% | 34,102 | 34,511 | −0.28% | 108.40 | 41.85 | 310 | 800 | 25 | 14°28′20″N 121°25′24″E |
| Santa Rosa | ∗ | Lone | 11.7% | 430,920 | 414,812 | 0.90% | 54.84 | 21.17 | 7,900 | 20,000 | 18 | 14°18′57″N 121°06′44″E |
| Siniloan | | 4th | 1.2% | 42,533 | 39,460 | 1.78% | 64.51 | 24.91 | 660 | 1,700 | 20 | 14°25′17″N 121°26′40″E |
| Victoria | | 4th | 1.2% | 45,230 | 43,408 | 0.97% | 22.35 | 8.63 | 2,000 | 5,200 | 9 | 14°13′54″N 121°19′40″E |
| Total | | | | 3,687,345 | 3,382,193 | 2.05% | 1,928.23 | 744.49 | 1,900 | 4,900 | 681 | (see GeoGroup box) |
1. Coordinates mark the town center, and are sortable by latitude.; ^{1} Los Baños was declared as the Special Science and Nature City of the Philippines through Presidential Proclamation No. 349. The proclamation, however, does not convert the municipality to a city or give it corporate powers that are accorded to other cities.

== Demographics ==
Population census of Laguna

| Year | Pop. | ±% p.a. |
|---|---|---|
| 1903 | 148,606 | — |
| 1918 | 195,546 | +1.85% |
| 1939 | 279,505 | +1.72% |
| 1948 | 321,247 | +1.56% |
| 1960 | 472,064 | +3.26% |
| 1970 | 699,736 | +4.01% |

| Year | Pop. | ±% p.a. |
|---|---|---|
| 1975 | 803,750 | +2.82% |
| 1980 | 973,104 | +3.90% |
| 1990 | 1,370,232 | +3.48% |
| 1995 | 1,631,082 | +3.32% |
| 2000 | 1,965,872 | +4.08% |
| 2007 | 2,473,530 | +3.22% |

| Year | Pop. | ±% p.a. |
|---|---|---|
| 2010 | 2,669,847 | +2.82% |
| 2015 | 3,035,081 | +2.47% |
| 2020 | 3,382,193 | +2.31% |
| 2024 | 3,687,345 | +2.10% |

Sources: Philippine Statistics Authority

The population of Laguna in the 2024 census was 3,687,345 people, with a density of 1,900 inhabitants per square kilometer or 4,900 inhabitants per square mile. Biñan is the most populous city in Laguna, accounting for 15.9% of the provincial population with 584,479 inhabitants, while Famy is the smallest municipality in Laguna with a total population of 17,668. In terms of population density, San Pedro and Biñan have the largest with both having a density of 15,000/km^{2} (39,000/sq mi), while Cavinti is the smallest with a density of 120/km^{2} (310/sq mi). Most of the people in Laguna live in the cities of San Pedro, Biñan, Santa Rosa, Cabuyao, Calamba and San Pablo accounting to 70.7% of the population of the province. Laguna is the 3rd most populous province in the Philippines and also the 3rd densest. Laguna has a median age of 24.9 years.

Population by ethnicity (2020)
| Ethnicity | Population |
| Tagalog | 2,894,851 (85.82%) |
| Bicolano | 162,961 (4.83%) |
| Bisaya | 140,890 (4.18%) |
| Ilocano | 44,173 (1.31%) |
| Hiligaynon | 36,695 (1.09%) |
| Waray | 24,336 (0.72%) |
| Cebuano | 10,508 (0.31%) |
| Pangasinan | 10,330 (0.31%) |
| Others | 47,991 (1.42%) |
| Not Reported | 41 (0%) |

=== Languages ===
Being in the middle of the Southern Tagalog Region, almost all people in Laguna speak Tagalog, with 99.2% of the population being fluent in it. It is spoken with a dialect greatly influenced from those spoken in the neighboring Cavite, Batangas, Rizal, Quezon and Bulacan, and has several variants in each municipality. There is a minority of people fluent in Bicolano, Hiligaynon, Karay-a, Ilocano, Cuyunon, Pangasinan and Waray. A significant portion of the workforce in Laguna can read and speak English and Filipino. In 2015, literacy in Laguna was at 99.6%.

=== Religion ===
Breakdown of religious affiliation in Laguna, 2020 census
1. Roman Catholic (88.2%)
2. Other Christian denomination (5.12%)
3. Non-Christian (1.80%)
4. Iglesia Ni Cristo (4.10%)

According to the 2020 Philippine Statistics Authority census, 3.327 million Lagunenses identify as members of a religion, spread across 127 churches and denominations. The largest religion in Laguna is the Roman Catholic Church which represents 2.974 million Lagunenses or 88% of the population. There are 88 Catholic churches in Laguna, including some of the oldest churches in the Philippines. Catholics in Laguna also follow cultural and religious observances practiced in the country, such as the Visita Iglesia and other observances.

Outside of Catholicism, the Iglesia ni Cristo has 4-5% of the Listing Members in the province, Iglesia Filipina Independiente, and Jesus is Lord Church have relatively significant population of Christian adherents. Other denominations such as mainline Protestantism, charismatics, and evengalicals also have churches in Laguna. Overall, these non-Catholic denominations make up for 10.12% of the total population of Laguna.

Non-Christian adherents practice Islam, Buddhism, Anitism, or some other religion. Some number of Lagunenses also identified as atheist. The City of Binan has an Office of Muslim Affairs to handle concerns from the Muslim community within the city.

== Economy ==
Poverty incidence of Laguna (%)

Source: Philippine Statistics Authority

=== Economic history ===
No other province besides Cavite experienced the rapid economic growth of Laguna between the late 1960s to the mid-1980s.

Present-day Laguna shows a thriving highly developed mixed economy. With a population of 3,382,193 (2020 census), and a total area of 1,760 km^{2} (680 sq mi) of land, Laguna produces millions of pesos worth of coconuts, rice, sugar, citrus fruits, lanzones and other products. Tourists flock to its beauty spots, especially Pagsanjan Falls, Calamba and Los Baños hot springs, Mount Makiling, Caliraya Lake and many others. Levels of development vary. The towns near Metro Manila have become industrialized whereas the inner towns continue to engage in agricultural production or pursue agri-based industries and cottage and small-scale industries. In 2015, Laguna was reported to have an equity of ₱4.474 billion, the second highest in the region behind Cavite.

Laguna is labeled as the "Detroit of the Philippines" because of the presence of major vehicle manufacturers in the city of Santa Rosa. It is also considered the "Silicon Valley of the Philippines" because of the vast number of electronic and semi-conductor companies operating in the province. Laguna is also the "Resort Capital of the Philippines", for it houses more than 700 hot spring resorts in the areas of Calamba and Los Baños.

=== Natural resources ===
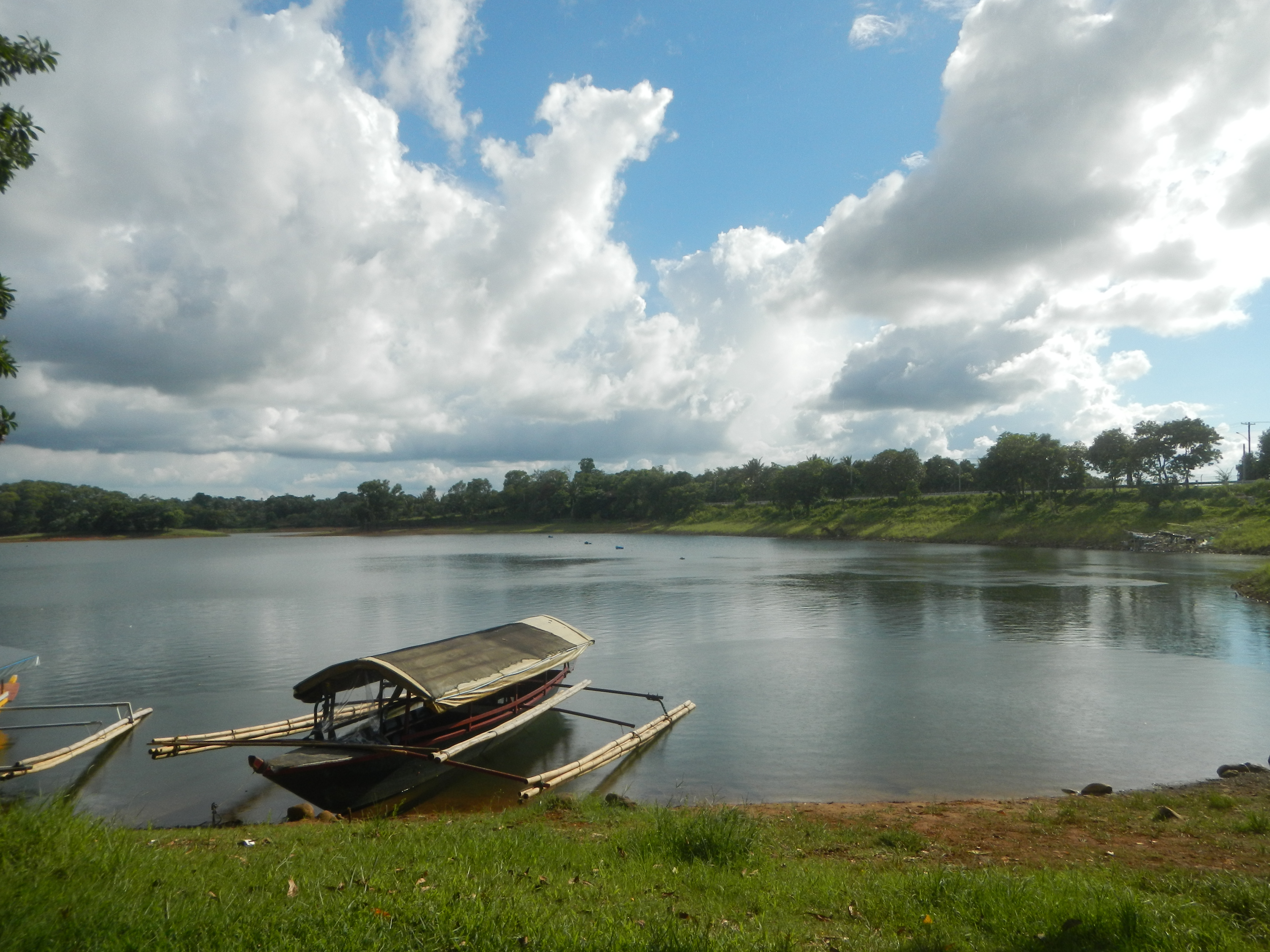
Caliraya-Lumot River Watershed Forest Reserve

The main natural resources of Laguna are in its agriculture and fisheries, owing to its position near Laguna de Bay and the surrounding lowlands.

There are about forty rivers in Laguna with a total area of almost 0.5 km^{2} (0.19 sq mi). Laguna de Bay has an approximate area of 3,800 square kilometers (1,500 sq mi) broken down into 2,900 square kilometers (1,100 sq mi) of land and 900 km^{2} (350 sq mi) of lake proper with 220 km (140 mi) shoreline. The shores of Laguna de Bay provide fishing grounds capable of producing 41,000 metric tons (41,000,000 kg) of fish, or roughly two-thirds of the fresh water fish requirements of Metro Manila.

Laguna has an estimated 300,000,000 US gallons (1,100,000 m^{3}) of underground water. At least seven principal water basins in the province with a total of 5,773 square kilometers (2,229 sq mi) drainage area and 1,316 square kilometers (508 sq mi) level area provide an estimated 9.238 square kilometers (3.567 sq mi) total run-off annually. There are two major watershed reserves in Laguna, the Malabanban Cabunsod Watershed Forest Reserve in San Pablo, and the Caliraya-Lumot River Watershed Forest Reserve, which spans the municipalities of Paete, Cavinti, Kalayaan, and Lumban. Overall, these two watersheds span an area of 11,164.71 hectares (27,588.6 acres).

Laguna has a relatively small mining industry compared to the other provinces in the region, with only 11 non-metallic mines registered in the region, and only 8 of which are operating. These mines are found in Santa Cruz, Magdalena, Siniloan, Lumban, and San Pablo. A total of 39.7823 hectares (0.397823 km^{2}) are used for mining purposes. Aggregates make up the largest amount in Laguna's mineral industry, with a value of ₱16,995,923. Overall, Laguna's mining economy contributes 8.87% to the region's total mining economy.

=== Agricultural activities ===
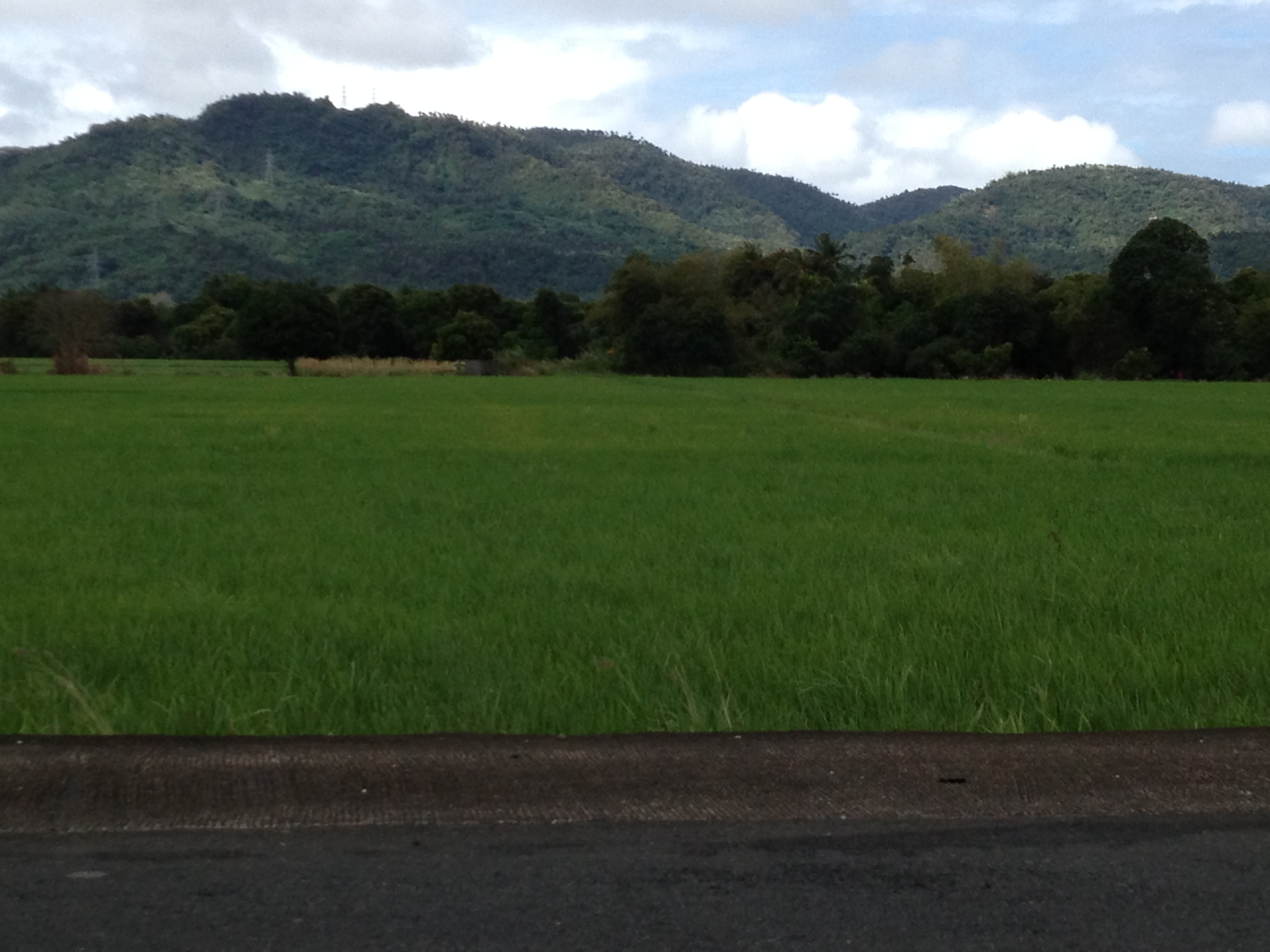
Rice field in Mabitac

Laguna has 60,624 hectares (149,810 acres) of alienable and disposable agricultural land. About 41,253 hectares (101,940 acres) or 23.44% of Laguna's total land area is forest land. In 2002, there were 38,445 farms in Laguna. The top five crops produced in Laguna are rice, maize, coconuts, mangoes, and bananas. Other crops grown in the province include Robusta coffee, pineapple, lanzones, rambutan, and sugarcane. Calamba was once the site of a sugar cane mill, although the decline of the sugar industry during the 1970s and 1980s resulted in its eventual shutdown.

Rice farming is an important part of Laguna's agriculture, with approximately 30,619 ha (306.19 km^{2}) of land used for cultivating 130,904 metric tons (130,904,000 kg) of rice. Los Baños is also the site of multiple research institutions specializing in rice, such as the International Rice Research Institute (IRRI), the ASEAN Center for Biodiversity (ACB) and the Southeast Asian Regional center for Graduate Study and Research in Agriculture (SEARCA), among others.

Laguna de Bay, with a surface area of 900 kilometers (560 mi), is the province's main fishing ground producing 410,000 metric tons (410,000,000 kg) of fish. Carp and tilapia fingerlings are also being grown in inland ponds and freshwater fish pens. There are a total of 457 operators utilizing an area of 1,839 ha (18.39 km^{2}) for fish pens and fish cages. Aside from Laguna de Bay, approximately 12% of the area in the Seven Lakes of San Pablo is being used for aquaculture.

=== Industry and commerce ===
Laguna hosts numerous industrial estates and IT parks registered with the Philippine Economic Zone Authority (PEZA), with major concentrations in the cities of Santa Rosa, Biñan, and Calamba.

In 2019, a 2.16 MWp commercial rooftop solar project at New Zealand Creamery in Calamba received the Asian Power Awards' "Solar Power Project of the Year – Philippines".

The province also has a growing IT–business process management (IT–BPM) presence in its urban centers; PEZA lists several IT parks and an IT center in Laguna.

== Infrastructure ==
=== Road network ===
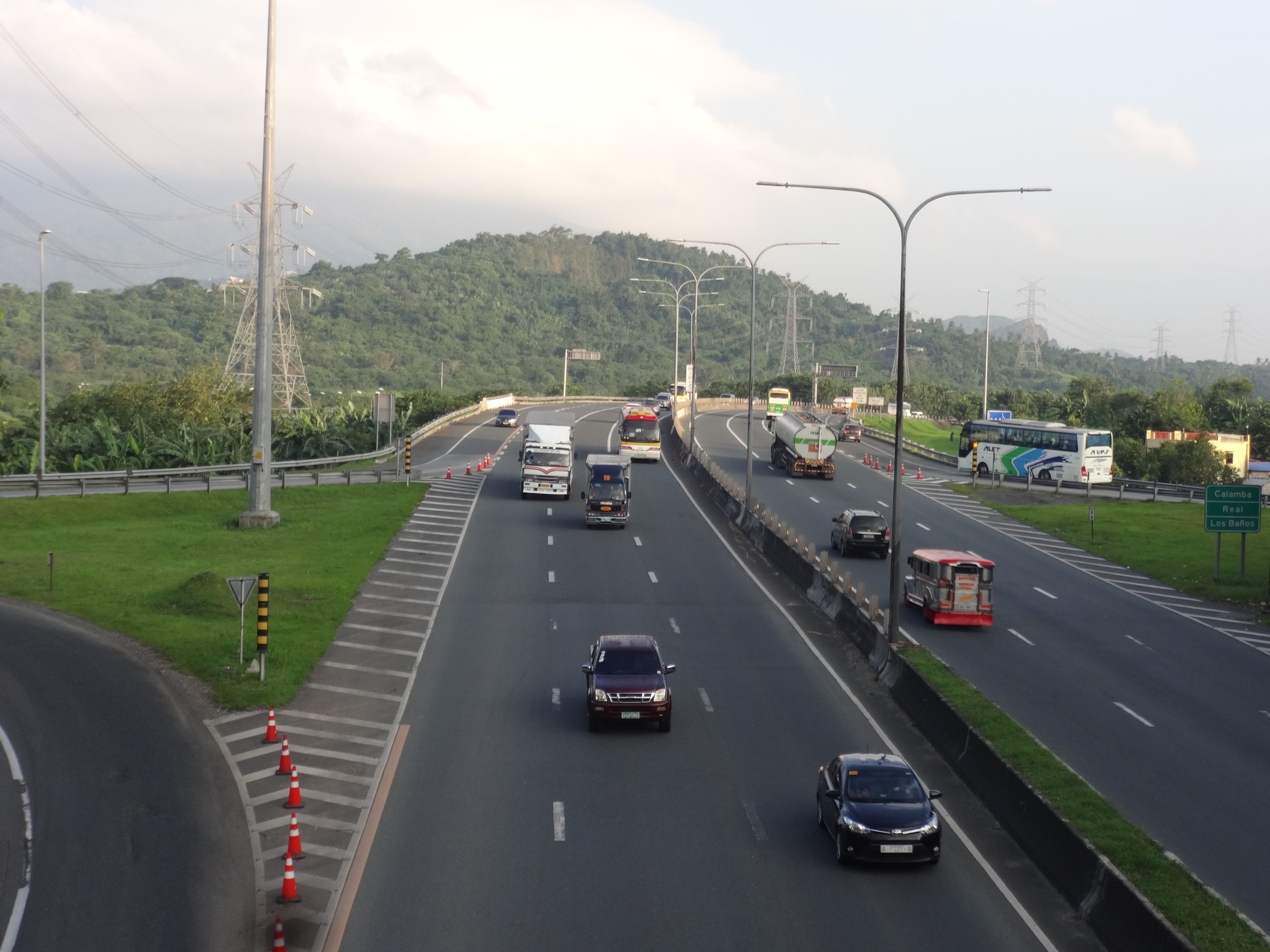
The South Luzon Expressway connects Laguna with Metro Manila and Batangas.

Laguna has a total of 348 kilometers (216 mi) of national roads, all paved. Daang Maharlika/Manila South Road (Route 1, AH26), Calamba–Pagsanjan Road (Route 66) and Manila East Road (Route 601, Route 602), Pagsanjan–Lucban Road (Route 603) and Bay–Calauan–San Pablo Road (Route 67), form the highway network backbone, and secondary and tertiary national roads interconnect most municipalities, with Magdalena only connected by provincial road. Provincial roads serves as a supplement to the national roads, and connects barangays and municipalities not connected to the main network. The highway network is interconnected with nearby provinces and Metro Manila.

The South Luzon Expressway (SLEX) passes through Laguna. The Cavite–Laguna Expressway begins in Biñan and connects the province to Cavite. A proposal to reduce travel time, the Laguna Lakeshore Road Network, from San Pedro to Calamba.

=== Railways ===
Railway transportation in Laguna dates back to the American colonial period, when the Manila Railroad Company (MRR) expanded the South Main Line through the province in the early 20th century. Following decades of decline, commuter services were expanded under the Philippine National Railways (PNR), leading to the launch of the newly-upgraded PNR Metro Commuter Line in 2010.

On July 2, 2023, PNR officially suspended operations along the Alabang–Calamba section to give way to civil works for the North–South Commuter Railway (NSCR). The segment passing through Laguna forms part of the South Commuter Railway Project (SCRP), a 54.6-kilometer (33.9 mi) electrified elevated dual-track railway linking Metro Manila to Calamba. Co-financed by the Asian Development Bank (ADB) and the Japan International Cooperation Agency (JICA), the project aims to reduce travel time between Manila and Laguna to under one hour. The NSCR is projected to achieve full operational status across its entire line by January 2032, following progress in construction and ongoing procurement for its operation and maintenance contract.

In addition to urban commuter services, plans were formulated for the ₱175-billion PNR South Long Haul (also known as PNR Bicol) to connect Calamba to Daraga, Albay and Matnog, Sorsogon. The project was originally intended to be financed through official development assistance (ODA) loans from China; however, on October 26, 2023, the Department of Transportation (DOTr) officially canceled its loan application with China following delays. To advance the long-haul line, PNR initiated preliminary site preparation works, including right of way fencing contracts in San Pablo. PNR has actively pursued alternative international funding sources, pitching the project to American investors at the US-Philippines Rail Technology Exchange and exploring public-private partnership (PPP) arrangements with Taiwanese firms.

=== Power ===
Three power generating plants are operating in the province.

- Botocan Hydro-electric Plant (25MW) – Majayjay
- Caliraya Hydro-electric Plant (23.5 MW) – Kalayaan
- Mak-Ban Geothermal Plant (20MW) – Bay

Meralco, the main electricity distributor of Metro Manila, has also the franchise for most of Laguna. Most of the municipalities in the 4th District, however, are franchise areas of First Laguna Electric Cooperative (FLECO).

== Government ==
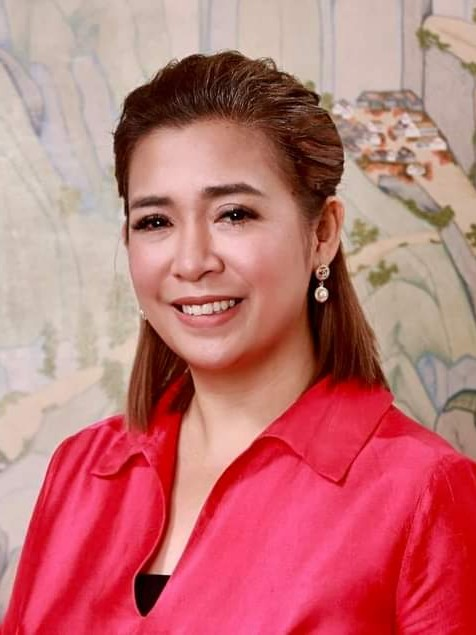
Governor
Marisol Aragones-Sampelo

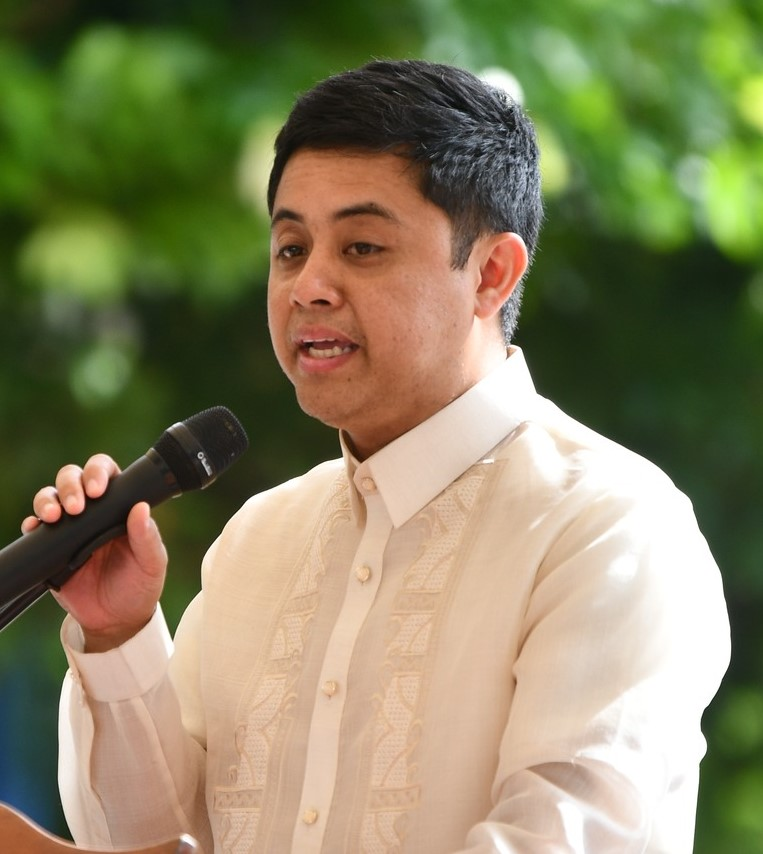
Vice Governor
Magtangol Jose Carait III

Laguna Provincial Capitol

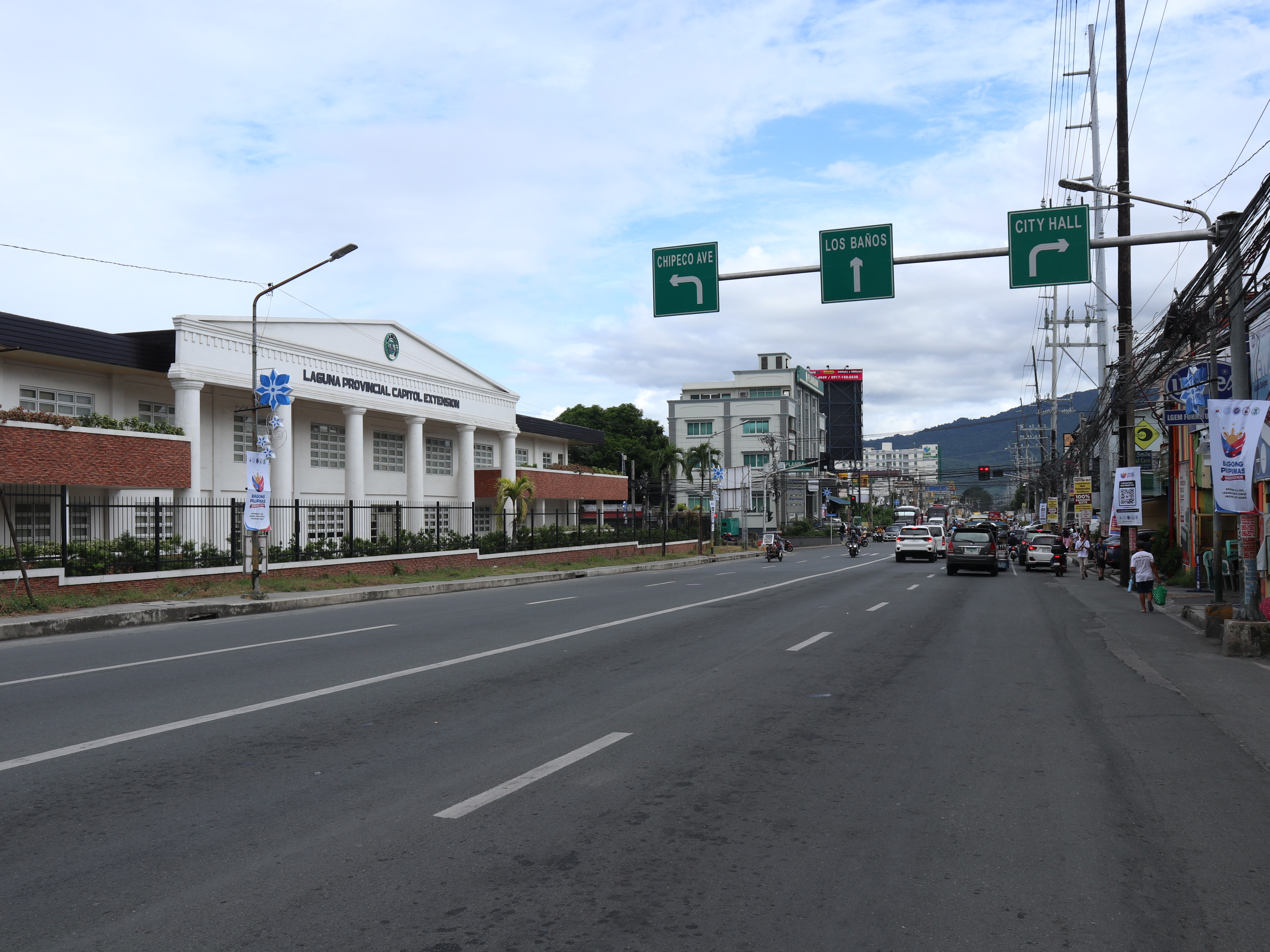
Laguna Provincial Capitol Extension Building, Calamba City

The seat of the provincial government of Laguna is Santa Cruz, and has been the capital since 1858. Historically, the provincial government was seated in Bay (1581–1688) and Pagsanjan (1688–1858) before setting in Santa Cruz.

The provincial government is organized under a governor and vice governor, as well as the Laguna Provincial Board. Laguna is divided to four districts and one district each for Biñan, Calamba, and Santa Rosa for the purposes of electing members of the provincial board and a member of the House of Representatives. On a municipal level, the province is governed by mayors and their own legislatures, the Sangguniang Panlungsod and Sangguniang Bayan for cities and municipalities, respectively. Each municipality is further composed for barangays, which are headed by a Punong Barangay and legislated by a Sangguniang Barangay.

=== Provincial government ===
The governor of Laguna is Sol Aragones since June 2025.

Governor
Marisol Aragones-Sampelo
Vice governor
Magtangol Jose Carait III
Provincial board
| 1st District | Rafael Campos | Bernadeth Olivares |
| 2nd District | Neptali Bagnes | Tito Fortunato Caringal II |
| 3rd District | Karla Monica Adajar-Lajara | Angelica Jones Alarva |
| 4th District | Jam Agarao | Rai-Ann San Luis |
| Biñan | Wilfredo Bejasa Jr. | Flaviano "Jigcy" D. Pecaña Jr. |
| Calamba | Princess Lajara | Dyan Espiridion |
| Santa Rosa | Jose Cartaño | Arnel Gomez |
| ABC | Lorenzo Zuñiga Jr. | |
| PCL | Arvin L. Manguiat | |
| SK | Bhenj Stephen Felismino | |

=== House of Representatives ===
On the legislative level, the province is divided into seven legislative districts, each of which elect their own representative to the House of Representatives.

| District | Representative |
|---|---|
| 1st District | Ann Matibag |
| 2nd District | Ramil Hernandez |
| 3rd District | Loreto Amante |
| 4th District | Benjamin Agarao Jr. |
| Lone District of Biñan | Arman Dimaguila |
| Lone District of Calamba | Charisse Anne Hernandez |
| Lone District of Santa Rosa | Roy M. Gonzales |

== Arts and culture ==
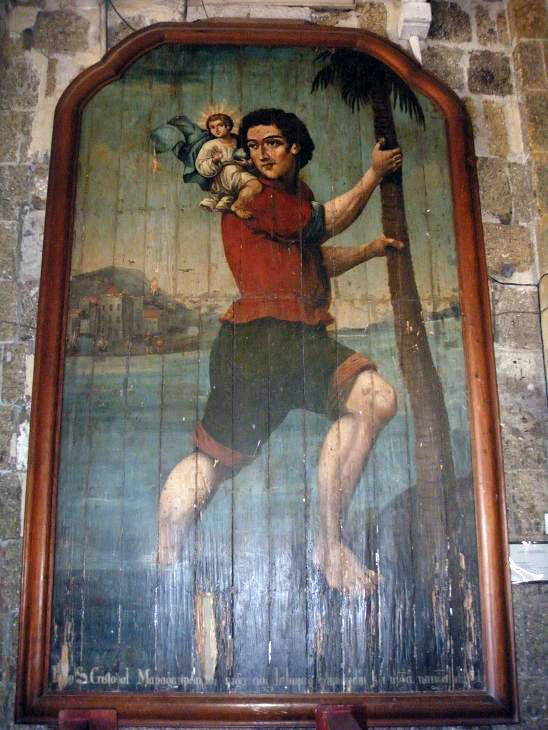
Mural at the St. James the Apostle Parish Church

Laguna is a major contributor to the development of arts in the Philippines. Paete is known as the "Woodcarving Capital of the Philippines" for the murals found in the Saint James the Apostle Parish Church. The church houses three murals created by Luciano Dans depicting images of Heaven, Earth, and Hell, as well as other murals of Saint Christopher. Some of these murals, however, need restoration as they have been infested by termites. Manuel Baldemor is an internationally acclaimed woodcarver born in Paete. Another famous icon in Laguna is the Our Lady of Turumba, found in Pakil.

Much like the rest of the country, Laguna celebrates multiple feasts and festivals throughout the year. Each barangay has their own fiesta in homage to a patron saint. Some of Laguna's famous festivals include the Turumba Festival in Pakil, the Pinya Festival in Calauan, and the Tsinelas Festival in Liliw.

== Tourism ==
Laguna has a large tourist industry, owing to its historical and natural resources. The Department of Tourism currently accredits two hotels, one inn, six resorts, one establishment, one restaurant, four tour operations, four tour guides, and two museums in the province. Laguna also has a total of 239 accredited tourist attractions, the second largest in the region behind Batangas. Tourism in Laguna is significant, although most of the visitors to tourist spots are foreigners, as opposed to other provinces in Calabarzon.

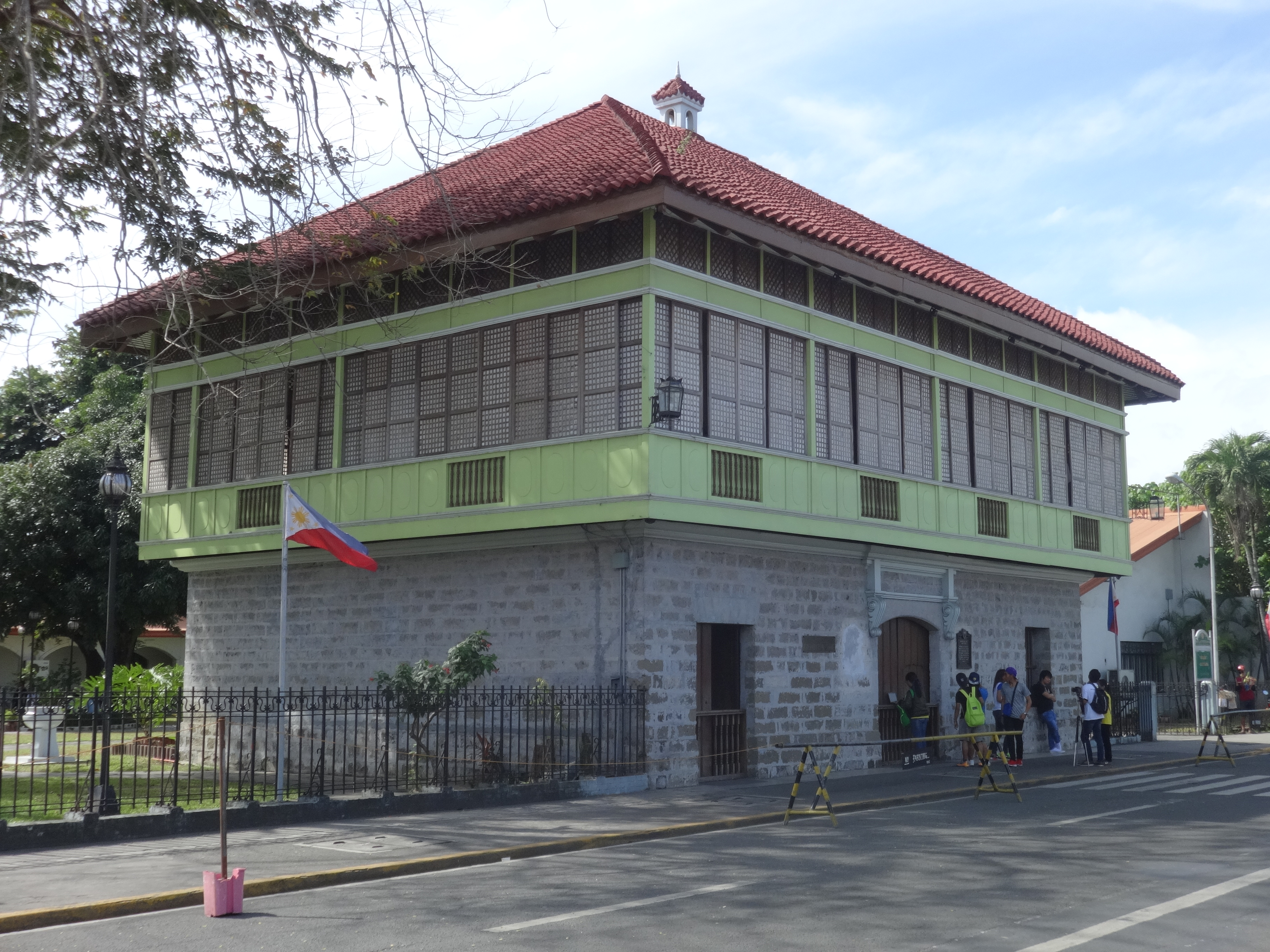
Rizal Shrine

Owing to its long history, Laguna has a host of sites that showcase the different periods of history in Laguna. The Rizal Shrine in Calamba is the ancestral home of the Philippines' national hero, José Rizal. Other historical sites include the Alberto House in Biñan, the Cuartel de Santo Domingo in Santa Rosa, the Pagsanjan Municipal Hall, the Pagsanjan Arch, the Nagcarlan Underground Cemetery, the ancestral homes and Pinagbayanan crematorium in Pila, Emilio Jacinto Shrine in Santa Cruz, the Baker Memorial Hall in UP Los Baños, and the Tipakan in Luisiana.

Other historical markers include the Japanese Garden in Cavinti and the Homma-Yamashita Shrine in Los Baños, both of which commemorate the Japanese occupation of the Philippines during the Second World War, the memorial sites of the Battle of Sambat in Pagsanjan and the Battle of Mabitac in Mabitac, and the Bantayog ng Kagitingan, Bantayog ng mga Bayani, Trece Martires Monument, and the Bonifacio Monument in San Pablo.

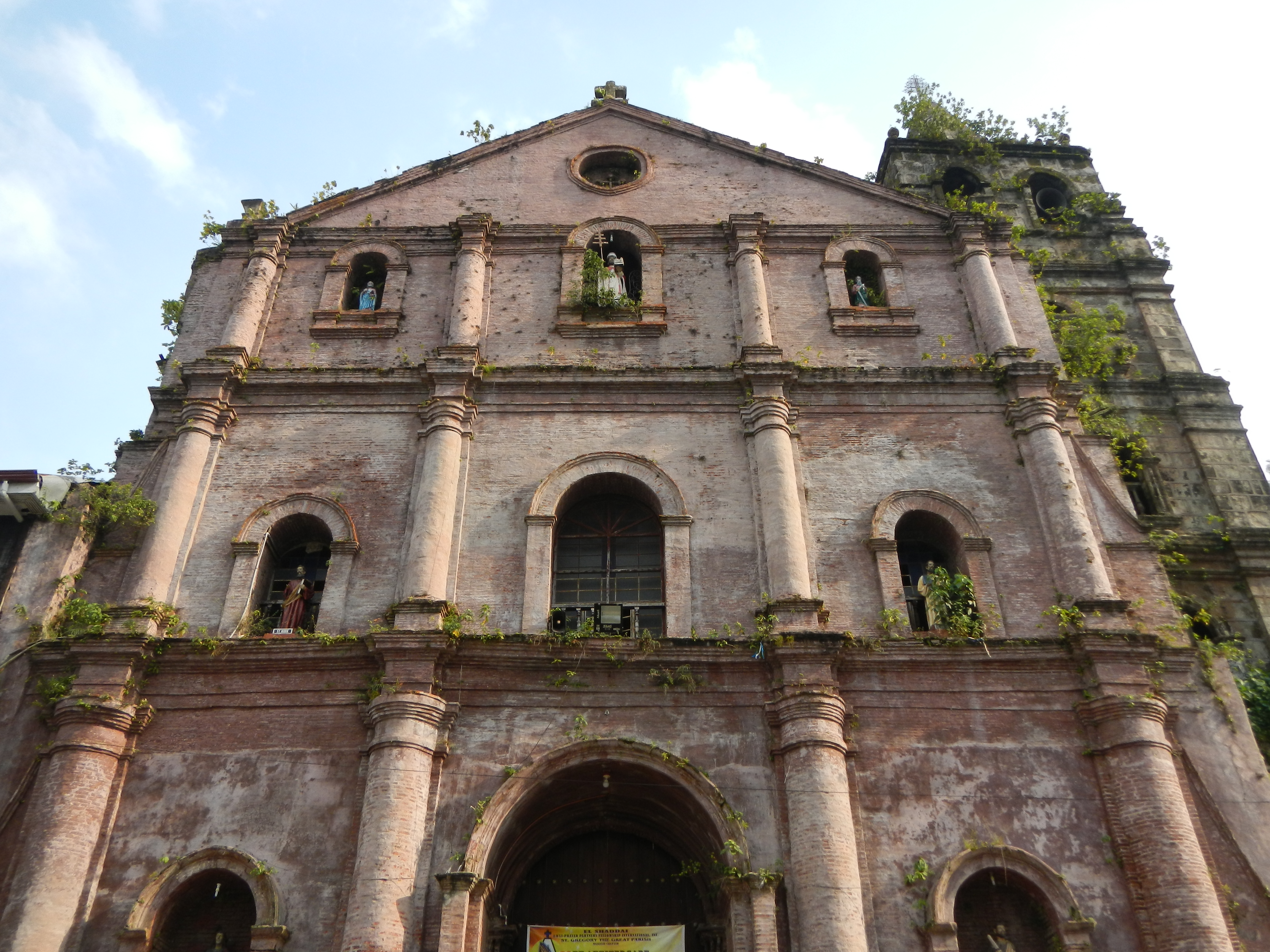
Saint Gregory the Great Parish Church in Majayjay

There are multiple historical and educational museums in Laguna in addition to its historical sites, such as the Pila Memorial Museum in Pila, the Salvador Laurel Museum and Library in San Pedro, the Museo de Santa Rosa in Santa Rosa, the Danilo Daleňa House of Paintings in Pakil, the Bahay Laguna in Magdalena, and the Monterola Museum in Nagcarlan. Los Baños is home to multiple museums, such as the IRRI Riceworld Museum, the Museum of Natural History, the Museum of the Wildlife Collections of Dr. Dioscoro Rabor, and the Entomology Museum.

Laguna is home to some of the oldest churches in the Philippines, dating back to the end of the 16th century. The St. James the Apostle Parish Church in Paete, and the Saint Gregory the Great Parish Church in Majayjay are considered to be some of the oldest in the province, dating as far back as 1578 and 1571, respectively.

Other historical churches in the provinces include the Saint Paul the First Hermit Cathedral in San Pablo (the see of the Bishop of the Roman Catholic Diocese of San Pablo), the Transfiguration of our Lord Parish Church in Cavinti, the Nuestra Señora de Candelaria Parish Church in Mabitac, the Immaculate Conception Parish Church in Los Baños, the Saint John the Baptist Church in Liliw, the St. John the Baptist Church in Calamba, where Rizal was baptized, the Saint Peter of Alcantara Parish Church in Pakil, which houses the Our Lady of Turumba painting, the Immaculate Conception Parish Church in Santa Cruz, St. Polycarp Church and the Diocesan Shrine of San Vicente Ferrer in Cabuyao, Santa Rosa de Lima Parish Church in Santa Rosa, and the Diocesan Shrine of Jesus in the Holy Sepulchre (Lolo Uweng) and the San Pedro Apostol Parish Church in San Pedro. Lolo Uweng Church was known as the "Quiapo Church of the South."

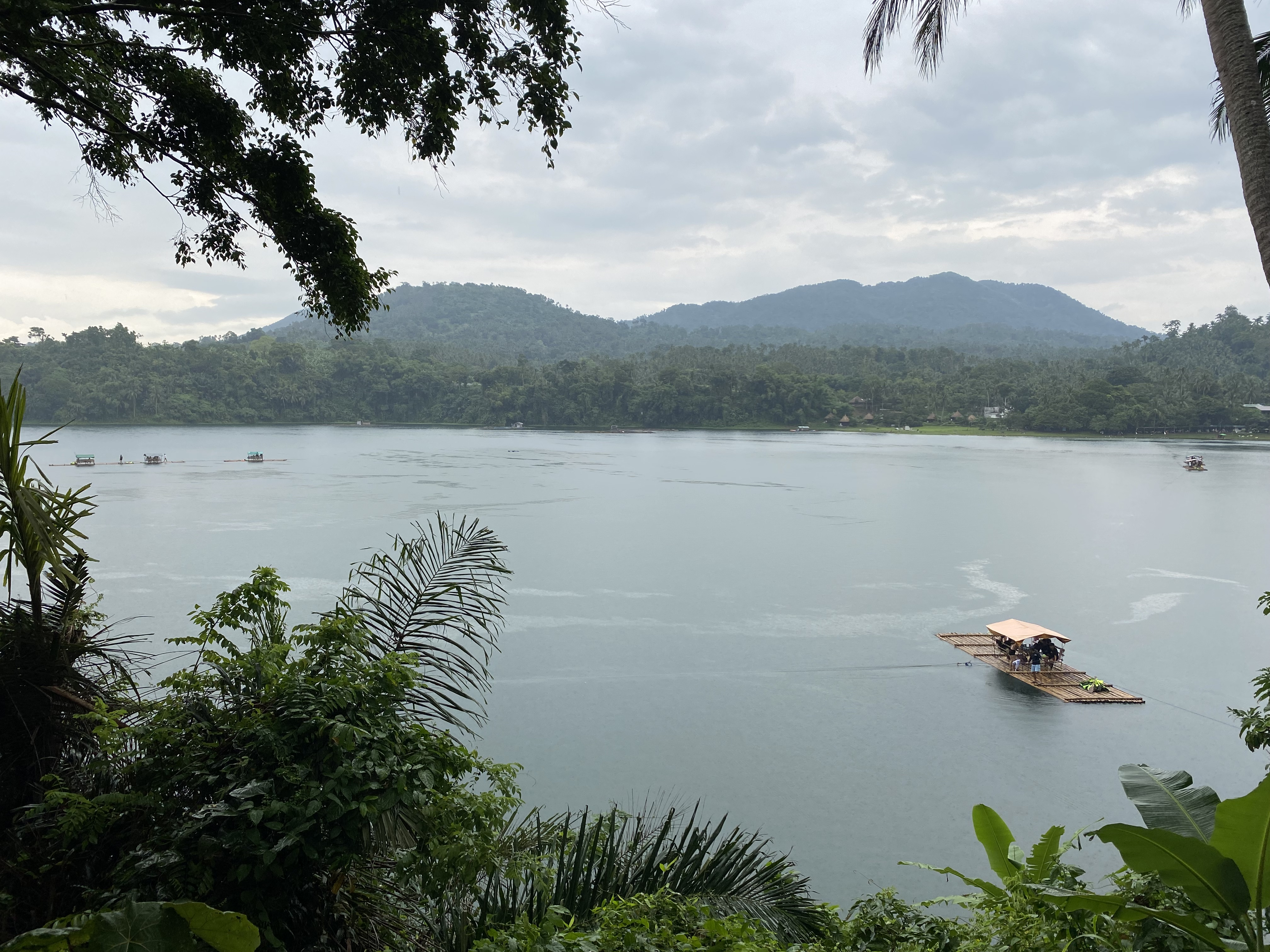
Lake Yambo, one of the seven lakes of San Pablo

Laguna contains many natural tourist spots, owing to its geography and climate. Laguna is home to the Laguna Volcanic Field, a group of 200 volcanoes and maars. The highest feature of these fields is Mount Makiling, which is also considered to be a holy mountain. The Seven Lakes of San Pablo are also part of this field. The highest peak in Laguna is Mount Banahaw, which it shares with the province of Quezon. Laguna also features multiple waterfalls, such as the Pagsanjan Falls, the Buruwisan Falls in Siniloan, the Botocan and Taytay Falls in Majayjay, the Talon ng Aliw and the Hulugan Falls, both in Luisiana. Other attractions in the province include the Cavinti Underground River and Caves Complex, the Simbahang Bato in Luisiana, the Dalitiwan River in Majayjay, and the Crocodile Park in Los Baños.

There are also multiple man-made tourist attractions and parks located in Laguna. The Enchanted Kingdom theme park is found in Santa Rosa and is accredited by the Department of Tourism. Other parks in Laguna include the Valesol Haven, the Boy Scouts of the Philippines Camp, the Maria Makiling Park, and the Makiling Botanical Garden, all found in Los Baños; the Wawa Park in Paete, and the Public Plaza of San Pablo.

Calamba and Los Baños are famous for its resorts and hot springs, lending to it the title of "Resort Capital of the Philippines". Other sites include the Turumba Swimming Pool in Pakil, the Caliraya Lake, Dagatan Boulevard in San Pablo, and the Sampaloc Lake Staircase.

== Education ==
Highest educational attainment (2015, non-overseas residents)
| No grade completed | 53,694 |
| Pre-school | 67,512 |
| Elementary | 673,229 |
| High school | 1,169,174 |
| Post-secondary | 64,042 |
| College undergraduate | 330,952 |
| Academic degree holder | 368,948 |
| Post-baccalaureate | 3,502 |
| Not stated | 1,140 |

Highest educational attainment (2010, overseas workers)
| No grade completed | 28 |
| Pre-school | 6 |
| Elementary | 3,298 |
| High school | 17,773 |
| Post-secondary | 7,333 |
| College undergraduate | 10,041 |
| Academic degree holder | 21,557 |
| Post-baccalaureate | 214 |
| Not stated | 44 |

Education rates in Laguna are high. In 2015, there were approximately 2,734,045 out of 3,035,081 people, which 90.1% of the total population, having attained some form of education. The literacy rate of Laguna in 2015 was 99.6%. Most people in Laguna are high school graduates, while most overseas workers from Laguna have a college degree.

There are 586 public schools in Laguna, composed of 458 public schools and 128 secondary schools. The city of San Pablo has the greatest number of public schools with 79, while the municipality of Rizal has the least with four.

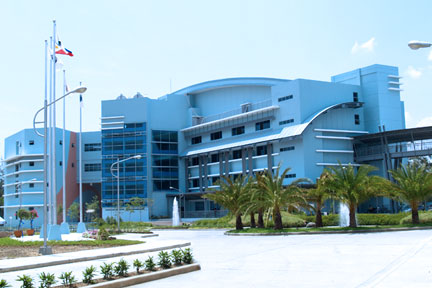
Rizal Hall at Mapúa Malayan Colleges Laguna

Laguna is home to multiple schools and universities. There are an estimated 18 universities and 37 colleges in the province. There are three state universities in Laguna with a total of 11 campuses: Laguna State Polytechnic University, Pamantasan ng Cabuyao, Polytechnic University of the Philippines, and the University of the Philippines Los Baños. UPLB is also one of the oldest universities in the Philippines, having been established in 1909. The International Rice Research Institute can be found within the UPLB campus and is known internationally for its work in developing rice technologies.

There are also multiple private colleges in Laguna. Some colleges and universities with main campuses in Metro Manila have also established satellite campuses in Laguna, such as Lyceum of the Philippines University-Laguna, De La Salle University – Laguna Campus, Colegio San Agustin, La Consolacion College, San Sebastian College – Recoletos, Colegio de San Juan de Letran, Mapúa Malayan Colleges Laguna, National University Laguna, and Our Lady of Fatima University – Laguna Campus. Most recently, the University of Santo Tomas and University of the East have announced that they will establish their respective campus in Santa Rosa.

Notable alumni from colleges in Laguna include Teodoro Casiño, a former member of the House of Representatives; Eduardo Cojuangco Jr., the chairman of San Miguel Corporation; and Jerrold Tarog, film director.

== Notable people ==
=== National heroes and patriots ===
- José Rizal – writer, propagandist, national hero of the Philippines (Calamba)
- Pedro Pelaez – educator, priest, known as the "father of Filipinization of the Church" (Pagsanjan)
- Ambrosio Rianzares Bautista – lawyer and author of the Declaration of Philippine Independence (Biñan)
- Paciano Rizal – military general and revolutionary; older brother of José Rizal (Calamba)
- Agueda Kahabagan – Filipina general of the Philippine Revolutionary Army (Santa Cruz)
- Fernando Canon – Filipino revolutionary general, poet, inventor, engineer, musician (Biñan)
- Juan Cailles – Filipino general during the Philippine-American War and first Governor of Laguna (Santa Cruz)
- Vicente Lim – World War II general (Calamba)
- Delfina Herbosa de Natividad – one of the three women, together with Marcela Agoncillo and her daughter Lorenza, who sewed together the Flag of the Philippines; niece of José Rizal (Calamba)
- Trinidad Rizal – feminist leader and co-founder of the Philippines' first feminist organization, the Asociacion Femenista Filipina. (Calamba)
- Saturnina Rizal Hidalgo – José Rizal's eldest sister (Calamba)
- Salud Algabre – Filipina leader of the Sakdal movement (Cabuyao)
- Rizalina Ilagan – anti-martial law activist who was abducted by state security agents and disappeared along with nine other activists in what is believed to be the single biggest case of involuntary disappearance during Ferdinand Marcos' martial law in the Philippines (Los Baños)
- Florencio Pesquesa – farm worker and labor leader during the Martial law era that was abducted and disappeared. His name is inscribed in the Bantayog ng mga Bayani (Calamba)

=== Sciences ===
- Encarnacion Alzona – National Scientist of the Philippines for Philippine History (Biñan)
- Dioscoro L. Umali – National Scientist of the Philippines for Agriculture and Rural Development (Biñan)
- Eduardo Quisumbing – National Scientist of the Philippines for Plant Taxonomy, Systematics, and Morphology (Santa Cruz)
- Ricardo Lantican – National Scientist of the Philippines for Plant Breeding (Los Baños)
- Dolores Ramirez – National Scientist of the Philippines for Biochemical Genetics & Cytogenetics (Calamba)
- Bienvenido O. Juliano – National Scientist of the Philippines for Biochemistry (Calamba)
- Gelia Tagumpay Castillo – National Scientist of the Philippines for Rural Sociology (Pagsanjan)
- Emil Q. Javier – National Scientist of the Philippines for Agriculture, and 17th President of the University of the Philippines (Santa Cruz)
- José Fabella – Filipino physician and a public health advocate, Father of Public Health and Social Welfare in the Philippines. (Pagsanjan)
- Bonifacio Arévalo – founder of the Sociedad Dental de Filipinas, which is now known as the Philippine Dental Association (Biñan)
- Jose Juliano – Filipino nuclear physicist and chemist (Calamba)
- Rogel Mari Sese – Filipino astrophysicist who is known for being a proponent of space science in the Philippines.(Los Baños)
- Francisco E. Baisas – entomologist regarded as the "dean of Philippine culicidologists" (Paete)
- Mercedes Delfinado – acarologist (Cabuyao)
- Aloysius Baes – environmental chemist, environmental and pro-democracy activist, educator, and musician (Los Baños)
- Gregorio F. Zaide – historian, author, known as the Dean of Filipino Historiographers (Pagsanjan)
- Leandro H. Fernandez – educator, author, and historian (Pagsanjan)
- Alfredo E. Evangelista – archaeologist (San Pedro)
- Vicente Fabella – first Filipino certified public accountant and founder of José Rizal University (Pagsanjan)
- Emerlinda R. Roman – educator, university administrator, and 19th President of the University of the Philippines (Los Baños)

=== Arts ===
- Marcelo Adonay – pioneer Filipino church composer and musical director (Pakil)
- José Maceda – National Artist of the Philippines for Music (Pila)
- Tony Mabesa – National Artist of the Philippines for Theater (Los Baños)
- Imelda Cajipe-Endaya – National Artist of the Philippines for Visual Arts (Paete)
- Patis Tesoro – National Artist of the Philippines for Fashion Design (Pagsanjan and San Pablo)
- Jonas Baes – composer of Experimental music in the Philippines (Los Baños)
- Alice Doria-Gamilla – composer (Nagcarlan)
- Cesar Alzona – military music composer and military official (Biñan)
- Maria Carpena – stage actress and soprano singer known as the first recording artist in the Philippine music industry; dubbed the country's "Nightingale of Zarzuela" (Santa Rosa)
- Gerry Alanguilan – comic book artist, writer, and architect (San Pablo)
- Sonny Trinidad – comic book artist (Santa Rosa)
- Manuel Baldemor – painter, sculptor, printmaker, writer, and book illustrator (Paete)
- Nena Saguil – modernist and abstract art painter (Santa Cruz)
- Danilo Echavaria Dalena – modern and contemporary painter (Pakil)
- Celso Al. Carunungan – writer, novelist, and film scriptwriter (San Pablo)
- Bonifacio Ilagan – playwright, screenwriter, filmmaker, journalist, editor, and activist (Los Baños)
- Frank G. Rivera – playwright, actor and production designer (Paete)
- Edgar Calabia Samar – poet and novelist (San Pablo)
- Celso Ad. Castillo – film director and screenwriter (Siniloan)
- Emmanuel Borlaza – film director and screenwriter (Liliw)
- Jerrold Tarog – film director and screenwriter (Calamba)
- Louie Ignacio – TV director (Pagsanjan)
- Rene Alviar - journalist (San Pedro)
- Tony Calvento, journalist (San Pedro)
- HaveYouSeenThisGirl – author of the books Diary ng Panget, Voiceless and She Died (San Pablo)

=== Religion ===
- Dalisay Lazaga – Roman Catholic Canossian nun and Servant of God (Santa Rosa)
- Leo M. Drona – Catholic Bishop, Second Bishop of the Roman Catholic Diocese of San Jose (Nueva Ecija) and Third Bishop of the Roman Catholic Diocese of San Pablo, Laguna (Pangil)
- Efren V. Esmilla – Catholic Bishop, Auxiliary Bishop of the Archdiocese of Philadelphia (Nagcarlan)
- Timoteo Ofrasio, S.J. – Filipino Jesuit priest, liturgist and lyricist; known for liturgical Catholic songs produced under the Jesuit Music Ministry such as "Paghahandog ng Sarili", "Isang Bansa", "Panalangin sa Pagiging Bukas-Palad", and "Alay sa Diyos", used during the 2015 papal visit to the Philippines (Alaminos)

=== Business ===
- Socorro Ramos – entrepreneur and co-founder of National Book Store, the largest bookstore chain in the Philippines (Santa Cruz)
- Jaime Aristotle Alip – social entrepreneur, and the founder and chairman emeritus of the CARD Mutually Reinforcing Institutions (San Pablo)

=== Politics, government, and civil society ===
- Rustico de los Reyes Jr. – Member of the Philippine Constitutional Commission of 1986 and former member of the Regular Batasang Pambansa (Santa Cruz)
- Crispino de Castro– Member of the Philippine Constitutional Commission of 1986 and first chairman of National Police Commission (NAPOLCOM) (Biñan)
- Ernesto Maceda – 15th President of the Senate of the Philippines, columnist, and lawyer (Pagsanjan)
- Pedro Guevara – former senator and former Resident Commissioner to the U.S. House of Representatives from the Philippine Islands (Santa Cruz)
- Wenceslao Lagumbay – former senator and former member of the Regular Batasang Pambansa (Kalayaan)
- Alexander Gesmundo – 27th Chief Justice of the Supreme Court of the Philippines (San Pablo)
- Estanislao Fernandez – 88th Associate Justice of the Supreme Court of the Philippines and former senator (Liliw)
- Lorenzo Relova – 103rd Associate Justice of the Supreme Court of the Philippines.(Pila)
- Conrado M. Vasquez – first Ombudsman of the Philippines and 102nd Associate Justice of the Supreme Court of the Philippines (Biñan)
- Arturo Brion – 161st Associate Justice of the Supreme Court of the Philippines, and 26th Secretary of the Department of Labor and Employment (San Pablo)
- Conrado Benitez – statesman, writer, educator, and one of the drafters of the 1935 Constitution of the Philippines (Pagsanjan)
- Crispin Oben – lawyer, member of the First Philippine Assembly (Lumban)
- Joey Lina – 15th Governor of Laguna, 20th Secretary of the Interior and Local Government, and former senator (Victoria)
- Cielito Habito – economist, professor, former NEDA Director-General (Cabuyao)
- Antonio C. Delgado – former Philippine Ambassador to the Vatican (San Pablo)
- ER Ejercito – 17th Governor of Laguna, actor, and former mayor of Pagsanjan (Pagsanjan)
- Norberto S. Amoranto – 5th Mayor of Quezon City (Biñan)
- Liza Maza – former Gabriela Partylist and Bayan Muna Partylist Representative (San Pablo)
- Sol Aragones – former news reporter and host of ABS-CBN News and Current Affairs, former legislator (San Pablo)
- Angelica Jones – actress and singer, former 3rd District board member of the Laguna Provincial Board (San Pablo)
- Cha Hernandez – incumbent congresswoman (Calamba)
- Benjamin Madrigal Jr. – 51st Chief of Staff of the Armed Forces of the Philippines (Los Baños)
- Victor Corpus – military officer and public official (San Pablo)
- Jeff Cagandahan – prominent Filipino intersex man and intersex human rights activist who first successfully petitioned the Philippine courts to change name and sex markers (Pakil)

=== Sports and beauty pageants ===
- Anthony Villanueva – boxer, 1964 Summer Olympics silver medalist (Cabuyao)
- Ariella Arida – fashion model, television personality, Miss Universe-Philippines 2013, Miss Universe 2013 3rd Runner-up (Alaminos)
- Ronato Alcano – professional pool player (Calamba)
- Maybelline Masuda – Filipino Brazilian Jiu-Jitsu practitioner (Calamba)
- Jema Galanza – volleyball player (San Pedro)
- John Vic De Guzman – volleyball player and actor (Calamba)
- Trisha Genesis – volleyball player (Sta. Rosa)
- Joshua Retamar – volleyball player (San Pedro)
- Mafe Galanza – volleyball player (San Pedro)
- Gilbert Malabanan – basketball player and coach (San Pedro)
- Kyla Atienza – volleyball player (San Pedro)
- Mean Mendrez – volleyball player (San Pedro)
- Yllana Aduana – Miss Philippines Earth 2023 and Miss Earth Air 2023 (Siniloan)
- Roberta Tamondong – Binibining Pilipinas Grand International 2022 (San Pablo)

=== Entertainment ===
- Marco Sison – singer, actor, politician (Binan)
- Jake Zyrus – singer (Cabuyao)
- Didith Reyes – actress, singer (Biñan)
- Rico Blanco – singer, songwriter (San Pedro)
- Julia Clarete – host, singer, actress
- Sabrina – singer
- Karylle – It's Showtime host, actress, daughter of Zsa Zsa Padilla
- Mario Montenegro – actor (Pagsanjan)
- Bayani Casimiro – tap dancer (San Pablo)
- Dencio Padilla – actor and comedian
- Palito – comedian and actor (Calamba)
- Teody Belarmino – film actor (Calamba)
- Alden Richards – model and actor (Santa Rosa)
- Angeli Gonzales – actress (Biñan)
- Alfie Anido – actor, matinee idol
- Paw Diaz – actress, model, TV host (San Pedro)
- Dion Ignacio – actor (Siniloan)
- C. J. Muere – actor (San Pablo
- Ronnie Alonte – actor, singer, dancer, It's Showtime, Hashtags member (Biñan)
- Jane de Leon – It's Showtime GirlTrend member, actress (San Pedro)
- Sabrina Man – child actress
- Princess Snell – actress (San Pedro)
- Halina Perez – model, actress (Santa Maria)
- Carmina Villarroel – actress (Santa Cruz)
- Charo Ronquillo – fashion model (Cabuyao)
- Charlene Almarvez – fashion model
- Barbie Forteza – actress, model (Biñan)
- Joan Da – finalist of the X Factor Philippines
- Thea Tolentino – female winner of GMA Network's Protégé Season 2 (Calamba)
- Jeric Gonzales – male winner of GMA Network's Protégé Season 2 (Calamba)
- Zephanie Dimaranan – an Idol Philippines Grand Winner, singer, (Biñan)
- Jak Roberto – actor, model (Nagcarlan)
- Sanya Lopez – actress, model (Nagcarlan)
- Jodi Sta. Maria – actress (Santa Rosa)
- Nadine Samonte – actress (Santa Rosa)
- Led Sobrepeña - Singer The Singing Bee, actor (Biñan)
- Stephanie Retuya – contestant and runner-up on Asia's Next Top Model (cycle 1)
- Jiggly Caliente – actress, contestant on RuPaul's Drag Race season 4 and All Stars 6, and judge on Drag Race Philippines (San Pedro)
- Jhoanna Robles – singer, member of p-pop group Bini (Calamba)

=== Others ===
- Teodoro Asedillo – Filipino labor leader and revolutionary who was branded as a "bandit"; popularized as a folk hero because of the film Asedillo (Kalayaan)
- Flor Contemplacion – Filipina domestic helper executed in Singapore after being convicted of murder (San Pablo)

== See also ==
- Campaigns of the Philippine–American War
- Laguna Lake Development Authority
- Roman Catholic Diocese of San Pablo
- Legislative districts of Laguna
