= Salud Algabre =

Filipina revolutionary

- Born: c. 1896; Cabuyao, Laguna, Captaincy General of the Philippines
- Died: 2 May 1979 (aged 82–83); Manila, Philippines
- Known for: Leader of Sakdalista
- Movement: Sakdalista

Salud Algabre (born 1896 – 2 May 1979) also known as Henerala Salud, was a Filipina revolutionary who fought for the country's independence from American occupation and for peasant rights, such as the equal distribution of land back to them. She was a leader of the Sakdal movement.

Algabre was born in 1896 to an upper-class family in Laguna. Her father was Maximo Algabre, a landowner from Cabuyao, and her mother was Justina Tirones, a seamstress. Only six survived out of her nine siblings.

== Education ==
Algabre was sent to Manila in 1903–1909 to obtain formal education. She lived with her uncle in Tondo, Manila. She was able to finish grade four until her mother made her stop due to fears of being taken away to the United States by her American teacher. She was privately tutored until 1st year high school. She spoke Tagalog, Spanish, and English.

== Family ==
Algabre's family has a history of participation in the country's revolution. Her grandfather led the town as gobernadorcillo until he was banished because he refused to kiss the hand of Spanish friars. He slashed his throat as a gesture of protest against the civil authority of the colonizers. His father eventually lost his land properties. Both his grandfather and father fought as soldiers on battles against the Spaniards.

Her uncle and relatives were also a member of the organization that spearheaded the country's revolution against Spanish colonial rule: Katipunan. Some of her relatives were exiled due to their illicit participation.

Algabre had many suitors and chose Severo Generalla. She married him at 21 years old in 1915. Her husband was the president of the Tobacco Workers Union of the Philippines. Her husband got involved in labor movements and it led to some troubles so they left Manila and returned to her hometown in Cabuyao. There they owned a stall at the local public market and worked as farmers, despite the loss of their lands as they relocated back to the province.

== Revolutionary involvement ==
Algabre and her husband worked as a landless peasant, and she lamented over oppressive land tenacy, claiming that the agreed percentage of shares weren't really achieved. Discussions with Filipino leaders and petitions expressed to the US government were fruitless. It prompted her to join the Sakdal movement at 36 years old. She was the only female member all throughout.

When she met its founder, Benigno Ramos, Algabre agreed to organize and disseminate the movement in Cabuyao. Her house became its frequent meeting place. She eventually rose the ranks until she became its leader. She participated and led uprisings, piloting a troop of men to blockade roads and capture municipal buildings. The government, however, successfully crushed the rebellion in an uprising in 1935. Many were killed and Algabre was arrested. She was later released. A scholar once implied to Algabre the failure of the movement and Algabre claimed that she never regretted being part of it as it was the highlight of her life, and that:

No uprising fails. Each one is a step in the right direction. In a long march to final victory, every step counts, every individual matters, every organization forms part of the whole.

— Algabre Salud

The movement's efforts didn't end in vain as the congress decided to consider and grant some of its appeals.
