= Agueda Kahabagan =

General in the Philippine Republican Army

Agueda Kahabagan y Iniquinto
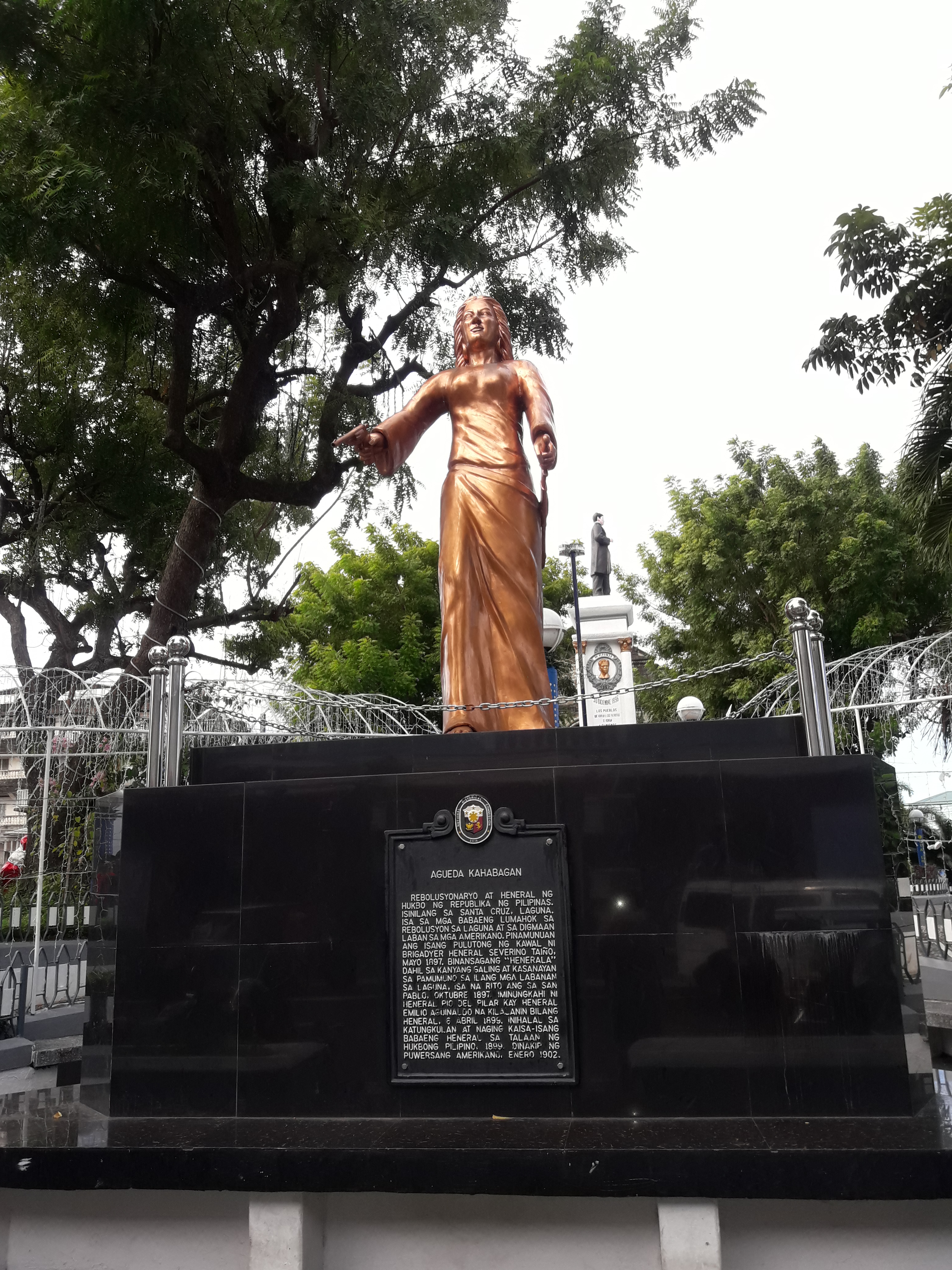
- Statue and historical marker of Agueda Kahabagan in Santa Cruz, Laguna
- Born: Unknown; Santa Cruz, Laguna, Captaincy General of the Philippines
- Died: Philippines
- Military career
- Allegiance: First Philippine Republic; Republic of Biak-na-Bato; Katipunan
- Branch: Philippine Revolutionary Army
- Service years: 1896–1901
- Rank: Brigadier General
- Nicknames: "Generala" “Henerala Agueda” "Tagalog Joan of Arc"
- Conflicts: Philippine Revolution; Philippine–American War

Agueda Kahabagan y Iniquinto was a Philippine general in the Philippine Republican Army and a member of the Katipunan.

She fought in the Philippine Revolution and The Philippine–American War. Few sources referred to her as "General Agueda". There are limited sources about her but from the information available, she was a native of Santa Cruz, Laguna.

She was reportedly often seen in the battlefield dressed in white, armed with a rifle and brandishing a bolo knife. Apparently, she was commissioned by General Miguel Malvar and General Severino Taiño to lead a detachment of forces in May 1897. Kahabagan was mentioned in connection with the 3-day attack led by General Artemio Ricarte on the Spanish garrison in San Pablo in October 1897. On April 6, 1899, General Pío del Pilar recommended her to be recognized as a general by General Emilio Aguinaldo. She was later appointed as a general in 1899, consequently making her the only woman listed in the roster of generals in the Army of the Filipino Republic.
