= Pagsanjan Gorge National Park =

National park in the Philippines

- IUCN category II (national park)
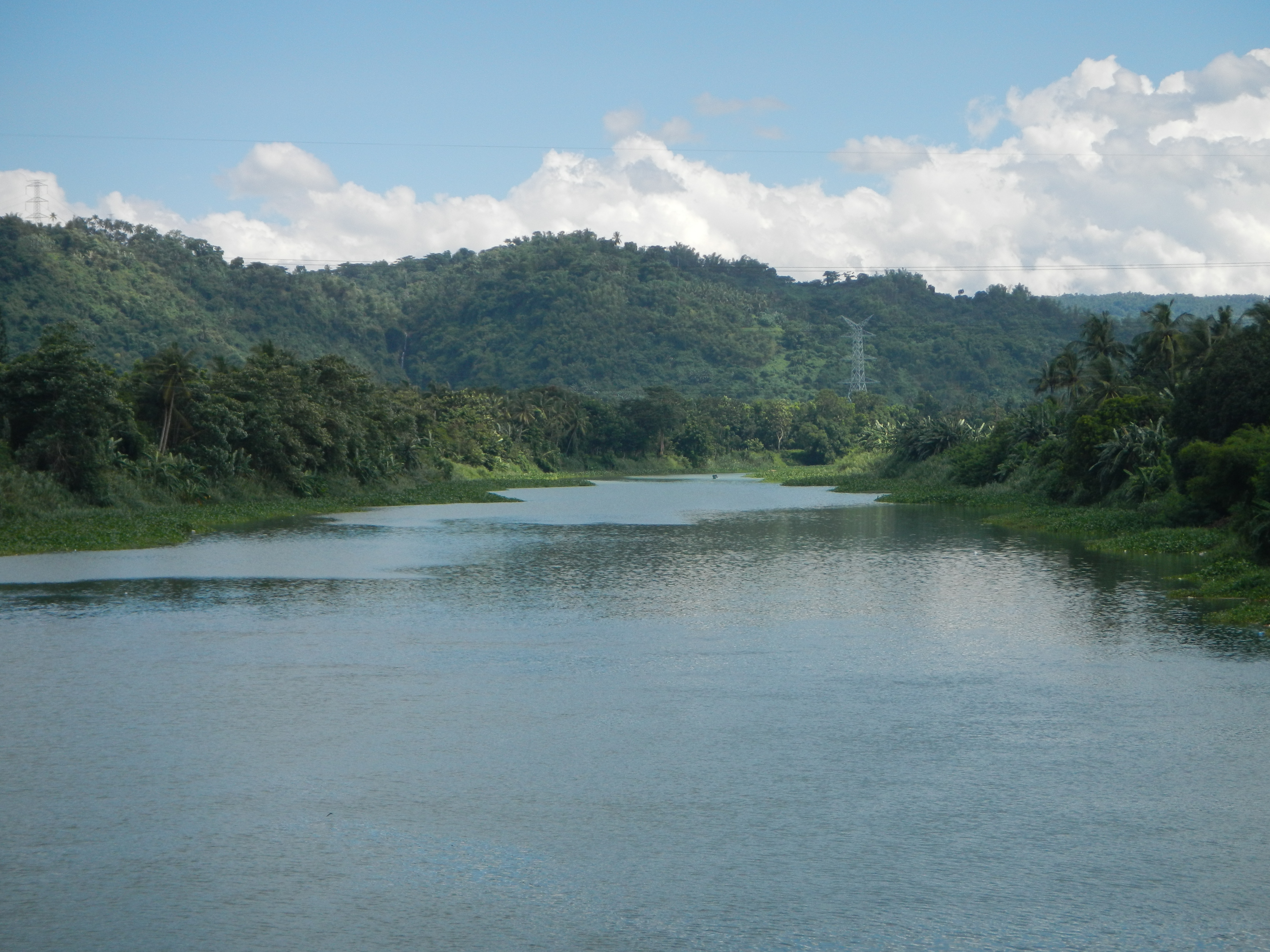
- Bumbungan River, also known as Pagsanjan River, near Pagsanjan Falls

- Location within Philippines
- Location: Laguna, Philippines
- Nearest city: Calamba, Laguna
- Coordinates: 14°16′0.5″N 121°27′49.3″E
- Area: 152.64 hectares (377.2 acres)
- Established: March 28, 1939 (National park); July 26, 1904 (Nature reserve)
- Governing body: Department of Environment and Natural Resources; Philippine Tourism Authority

The Pagsanjan Gorge National Park is a national park and tourist zone located in the province of Laguna in the Philippines, approximately 100 kilometres (62 mi) southeast of Manila. It protects an area of 152.64 hectares (377.2 acres) around a series of gorges on the Bumbungan River which leads to Pagsanjan Falls. It is one of the oldest parks in the country and one of two protected areas in Laguna. It is situated in the municipalities of Pagsanjan, Cavinti and Lumban.

== History ==
The park was first established in 1904 through Executive Order No. 33 signed by Civil Governor Luke Edward Wright. The Caliraya Falls Reserve covered 5,892.22 hectares (22.7500 mi^{2}) and was initially set aside for the development of water power from the falls of the Caliraya River. Executive Order No. 65 by Governor-General William Cameron Forbes in 1913 reduced its size to 2,019.34 hectares (20,193,400 m^{2}). In 1939, through Proclamation No. 392 signed by President Manuel Luis Quezon, the reserve was reclassified and renamed to Pagsanjan Gorge National Park with its area further reduced to its present size.

The national park was declared a tourist zone in 1976 with the administration and control transferred to the Philippine Tourism Authority.

== See also ==
- List of national parks of the Philippines
