= Our Lady of Guadalupe Parish Church (Pagsanjan) =

Roman Catholic church in Laguna, Philippines

Pagsanjan Church
- Our Lady of Guadalupe Parish Church; Diocesan Shrine of Our Lady of Guadalupe
- Santuario Diocesano de Nuestra Señora de Guadalupe (Spanish)
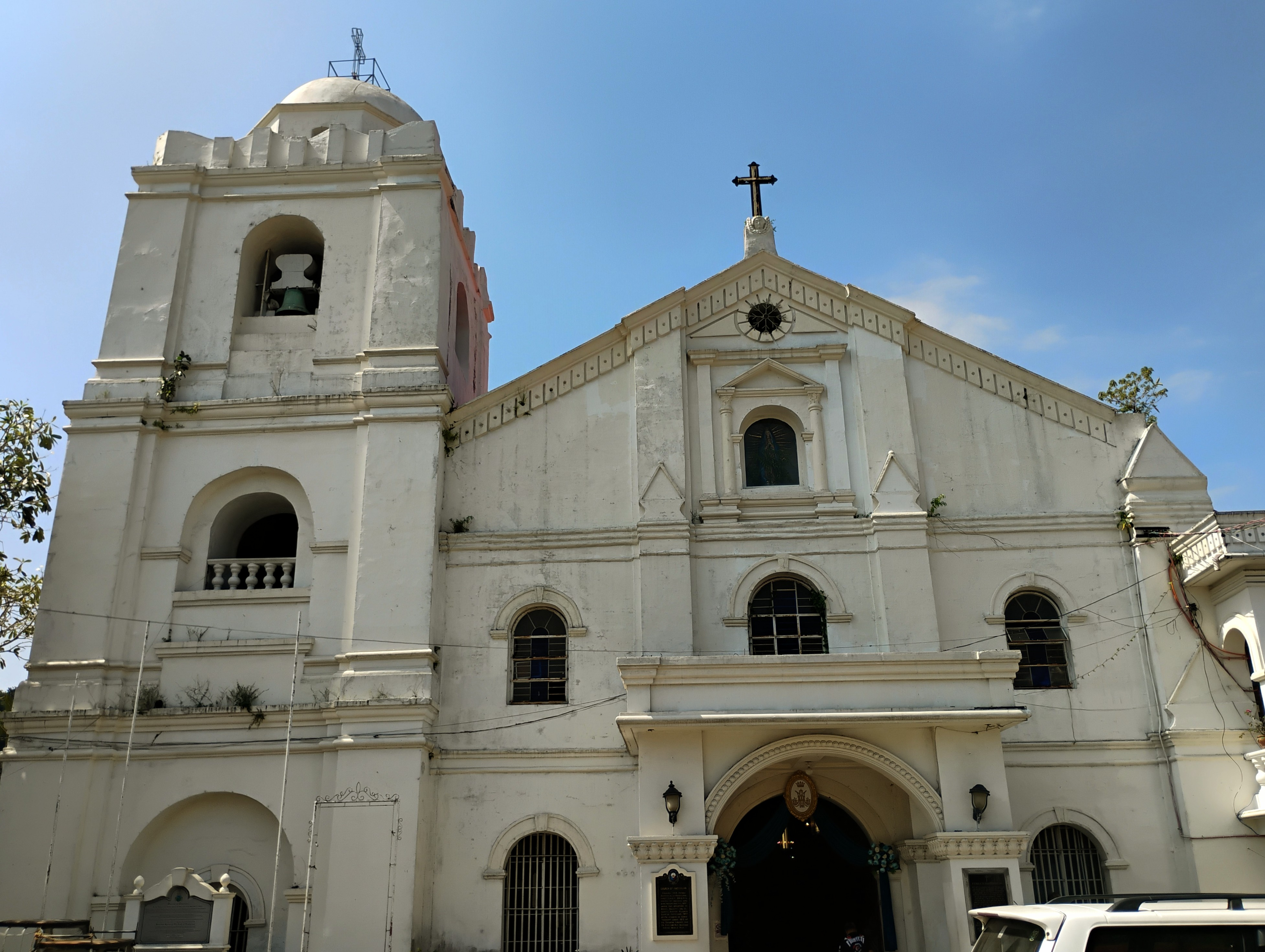
- Church facade

- Location in Laguna Location in Luzon Location in the Philippines
- 14°16′22″N 121°27′22″E
- Location: Pagsanjan, Laguna
- Country: Philippines
- Denomination: Roman Catholic

History
- Status: Diocesan Shrine and Parish church
- Founded: 1687
- Founder: Agustin de la Magdalena
- Dedication: Our Lady of Guadalupe

Architecture
- Functional status: Active
- Architectural type: Church building

Specifications
- Materials: Adobe, lime mixed with carabao milk

Administration
- Province: Manila
- Metropolis: Manila
- Archdiocese: Manila
- Diocese: San Pablo
- Deanery: Our Lady of Guadalupe

Clergy
- Rector: Ireneo Oliver

Our Lady of Guadalupe Parish Church, designated as the Diocesan Shrine of Our Lady of Guadalupe, of the Diocese of San Pablo, is a Roman Catholic church in Pagsanjan, Laguna, Philippines. It is the oldest church in the country under the patronage of Our Lady of Guadalupe, whose image was a gift from Mexico.

== History ==
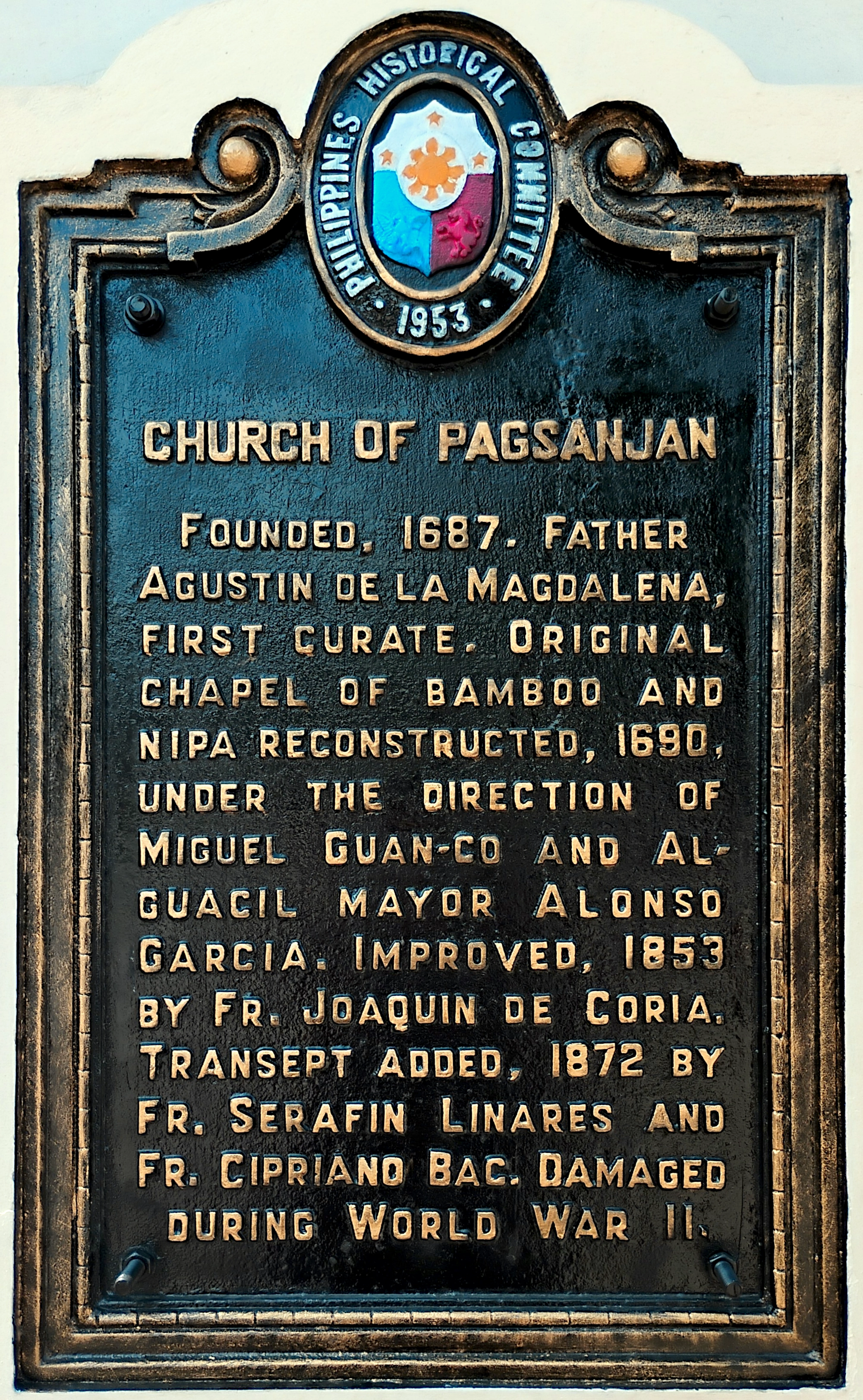
Church PHC historical marker installed in 1953

A former visita of Lumban, the parish church of Pagsanjan was founded on November 12, 1687, by Franciscan missionary Father Agustin de la Magdalena as its first pastor (parish priest). The first church was originally made of light materials like bamboo, nipa and wood in 1688 by natives of Pagsanjan under forced labor. A larger and more solid church constructed from adobe with a red-tiled roof was built in 1690 with the help of Chinese Miguel Guan Co and chief alguacil alferez Alonzo Garcia to replace the original church.

Further renovations were conducted from 1847 to 1852 under Father Joaquin de Coria, who engineered the stone belfry and Romanesque dome. In 1872, the church added a transept under the direction of Father Serafin Linares and Father Cipriano Bac.

The church was heavily damaged by American and Filipino military bombers on March 15, 1945, during World War II. A replica of the church was constructed over its ruins, without the original dome, with the help of Manila Pagsanjenos under the leadership of Engr. German Yia and Dr. Rosendo Llamas. Serious restoration efforts after the war took place in 1965 under Lipa Archbishop Alejandro Olalia. On April 6, 1969, Bishop Pedro Bantigue blessed the rebuilt church and consecrated the main altar. Due to the devotion of the people of Pagsanjan and nearby towns, the Diocese of San Pablo declared Pagsanjan Church as the Diocesan Shrine of Our Lady of Guadalupe in 2012. Under the term of Monsignor Castillo from 2013 to the present, further renovations were carried out, including the church patio and the construction of the choir loft and church gate.

== Features ==
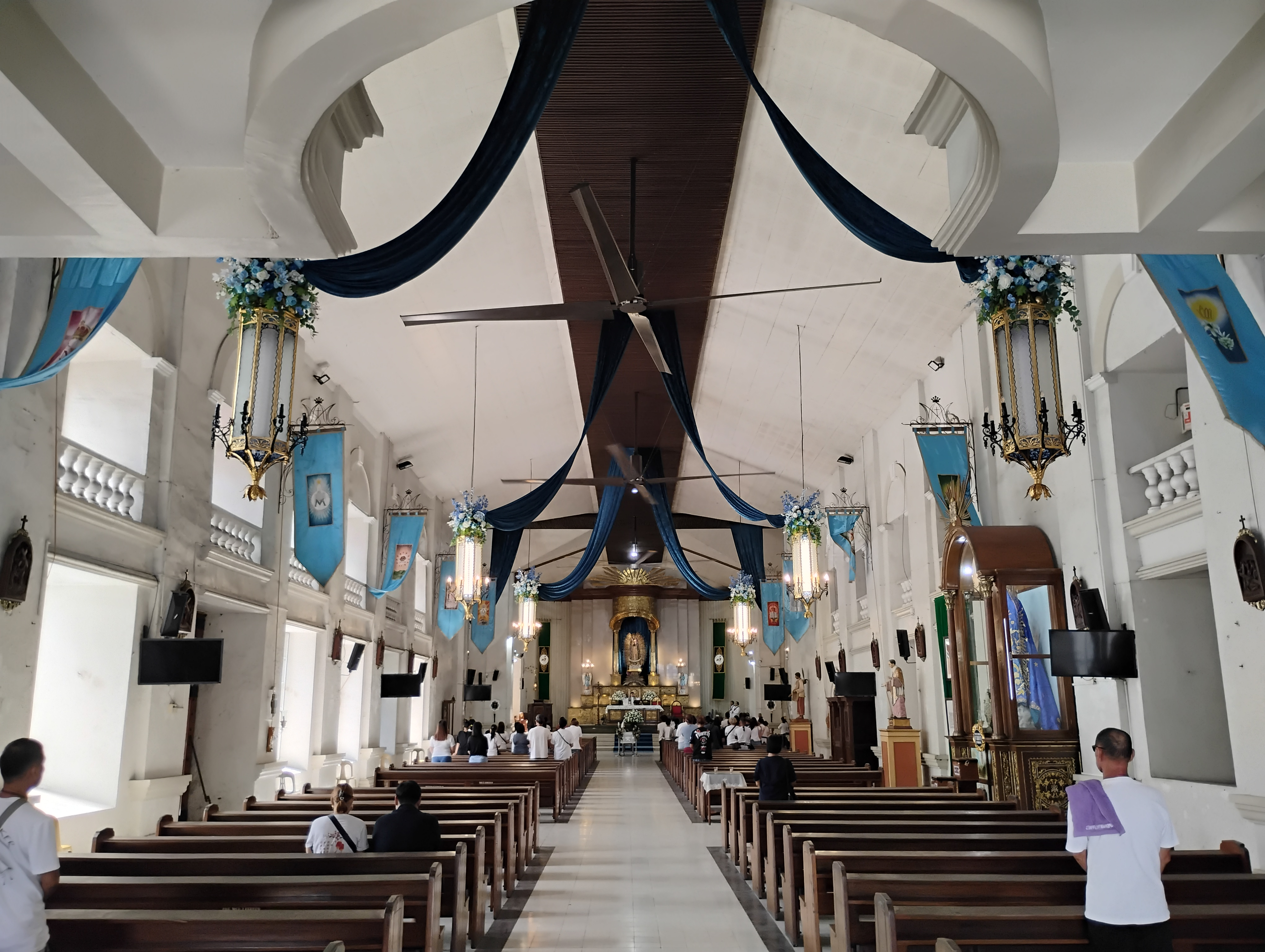
Church interior in 2025

The facade of Pagsanjan church is a three-level early Renaissance styled facade with a semicircular arched main entrance, choir loft window and a three-story bell tower. A side chapel near the altar houses an image of San Juan Diego, a replica of the tilma of the Our Lady of Guadalupe and a stone relic from Tepeyac Hill, Mexico City, in 1531, the site of the apparition of the Virgin of Guadalupe. The chapel is also a mini-museum containing liturgical vestments of Pagsanjeño priests.

== Images of Our Lady of Guadalupe ==
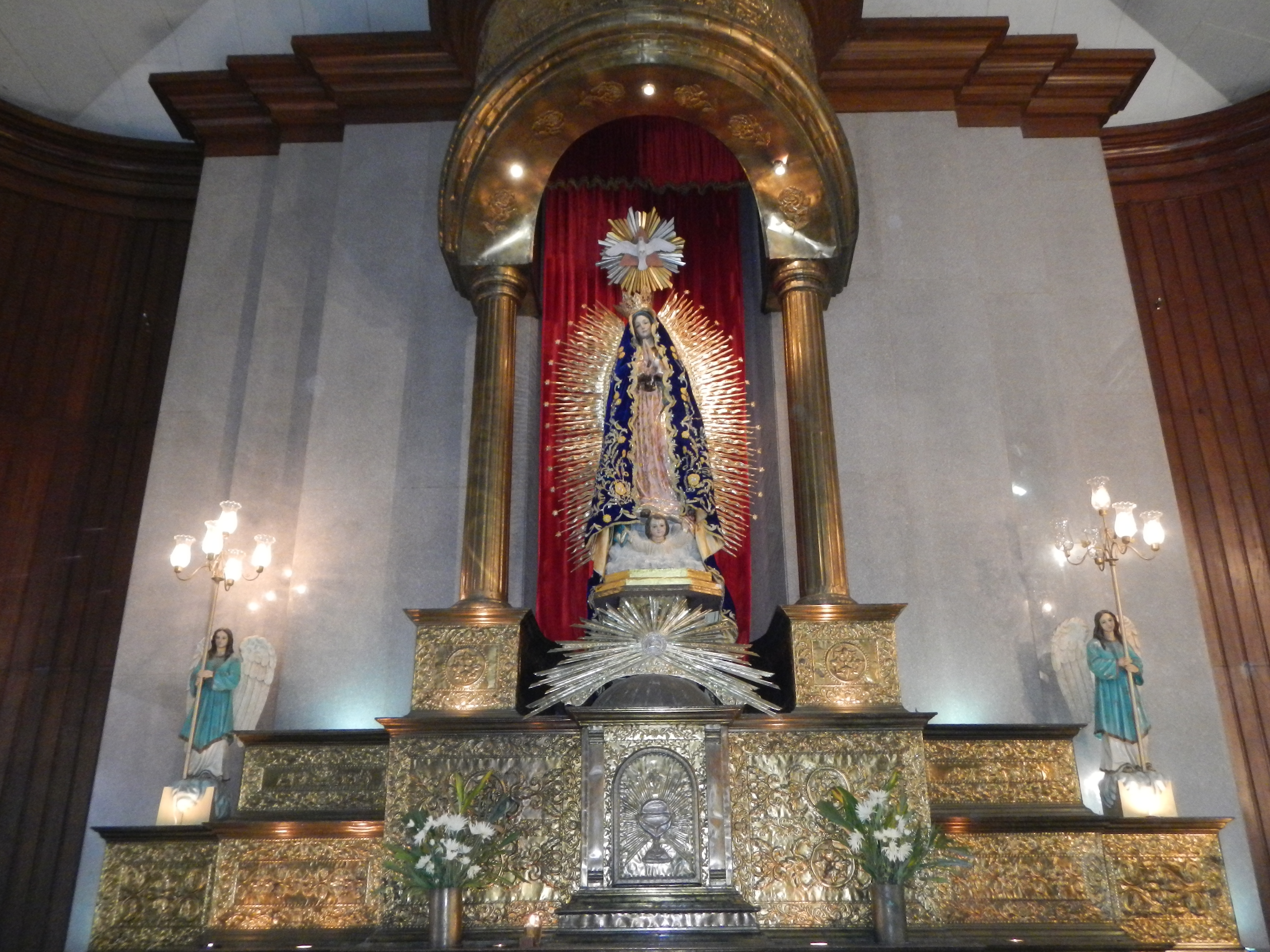
Our Lady of Guadalupe

Within the church of Pagsanjan, two images of the town patroness, Our Lady of Guadalupe, can be found. The original image of Our Lady of Guadalupe was donated by Father Agustin when the parish was first established. The image was given to him as a gift from rich and pious Mexican families; it was installed at the main altar on December 12, 1688. However, the original image was destroyed during the American and Filipino military bombings of 1945. In 1958, Mexican Catholics contributed a life-sized image of Our Lady of Guadalupe sculpted by Ramon Barretto of Toluca, which can be seen in the church today. The image of Our Lady of Guadalupe placed on the main altar was sculpted by Maximo Vicente of Manila postwar and was episcopally crowned in 1947.

== See also ==
- Pagsanjan Arch

== Bibliography ==
- Huerta, Felix de (1865). Estado geográfico, topográfico, estadístico, histórico-religioso. Binondo: Imprenta de M. Sanchez y Ca.
- Layug, Benjamin (2007). A tourist guide to notable Philippine Churches. Quezon City: New Day Publication.
- Mapua, Lisa (2008). Stamps of the Philippines: Historical and topical collections, 1854-2004. Philippine Small and Medium Business Development Foundation. p. 165. ISBN 978-9719246411.
- Zaide, Gregorio (1975). "Chapter 1: Pagsanjan, A Mini-Town of Global Fame". Pagsanjan in History and Legend. Social Studies Publications.
