= Pagsanjan Falls =

Waterfall in Cavinti, Laguna, Philippines

Cavinti Falls
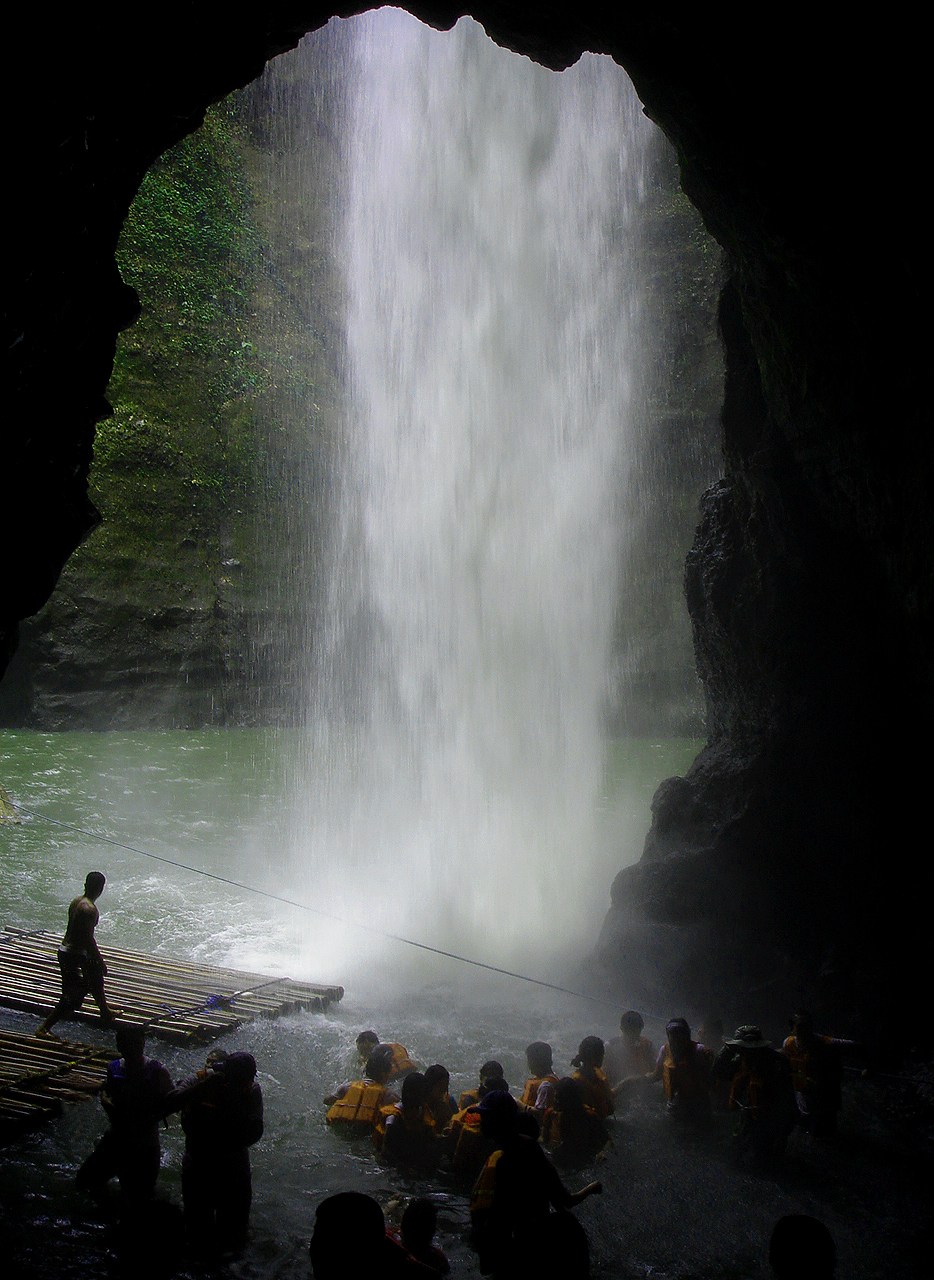
- Inside the Devil's Cave behind the waterfall
- Interactive map of Cavinti Falls
- Location: Cavinti, Laguna, Philippines
- Coordinates: 14°15′45.32″N 121°29′59.86″E
- Type: Plunge
- Number of drops: 3 (one is hidden)
- Longest drop: 120 metres (390 ft)
- Watercourse: Pagsanjan River

Cavinti Falls, colloquially known by its old name Pagsanjan Falls (local name: Magdapio Falls), is one of the most famous waterfalls in the Philippines. Located in the province of Laguna, the falls is one of the major tourist attractions of the region. The three-drop waterfall is reached by a river trip on dugout canoe, known locally as "Shooting the Rapids", originating from the municipality of Pagsanjan. The falls can also be reached from the top by a short hike from Cavinti.

The boat ride has been an attraction since the Spanish colonial era, with the oldest surviving written account dating to 1894. The town of Pagsanjan lies at the confluence of two rivers, the Balanac River and the Bumbungan River (also known as the Pagsanjan River).

== Location ==
The main falls are actually located within the territorial jurisdiction of Cavinti, Laguna, approximately 3.2 kilometers away from the boundary of Cavinti and Pagsanjan, but the more popular access by canoes originates from the town of Pagsanjan. An ordinance passed by the ruling body of the town of Cavinti was submitted to the Sangguniang Bayan (legislature of municipalities in the Philippines) on February 10, 2009, proposing the renaming of the falls to its rightful name, "Cavinti Falls".

== National Park ==
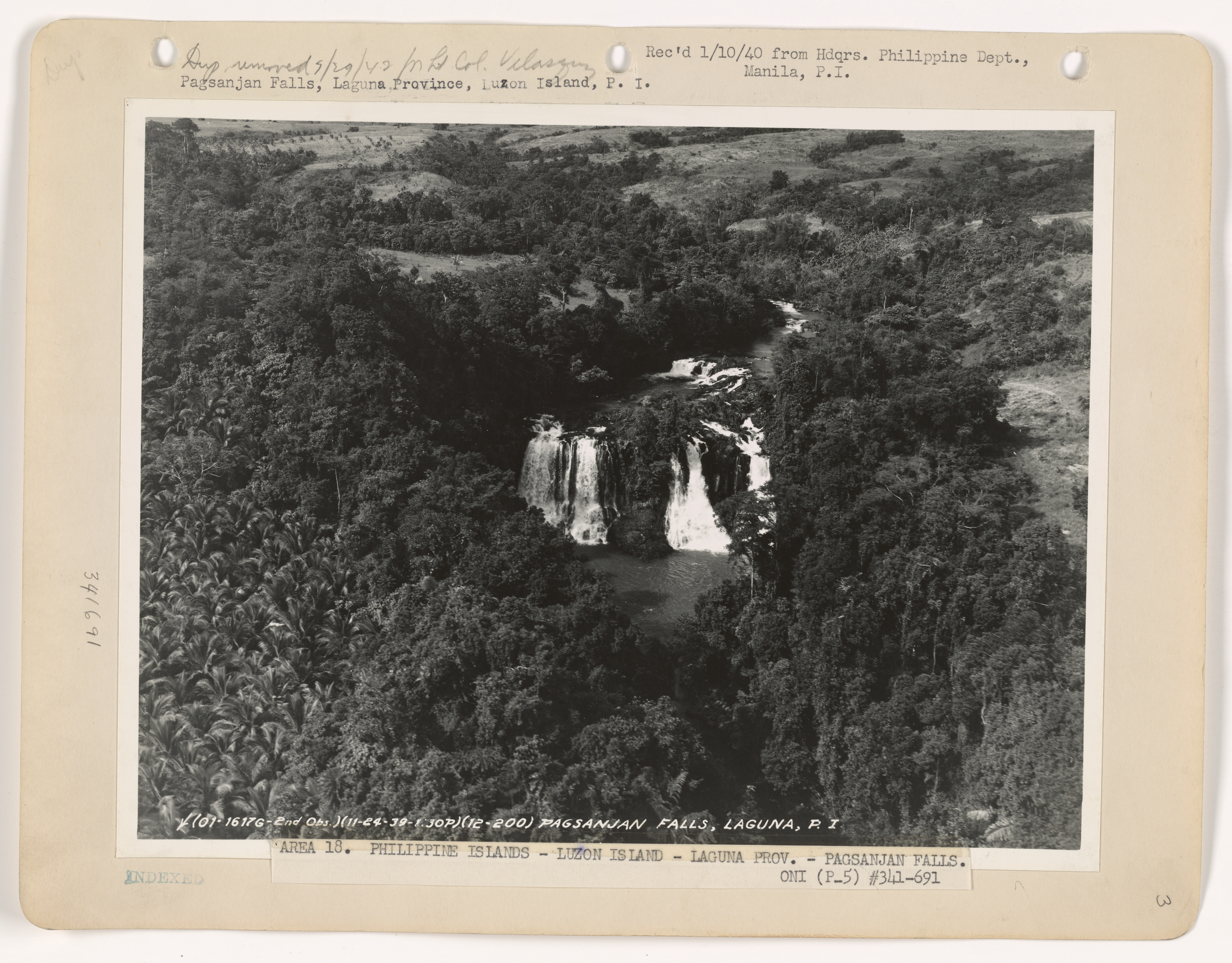
Aerial view of Pagsanjan Falls, circa 1940s

The waterfall and gorge were declared a National Park with Proclamation 392 on March 29, 1939, and Proc. 1551 on March 31, 1976. The Pagsanjan Gorge National Park covers an area of 152.64 hectares (377.2 acres).

== Legend ==
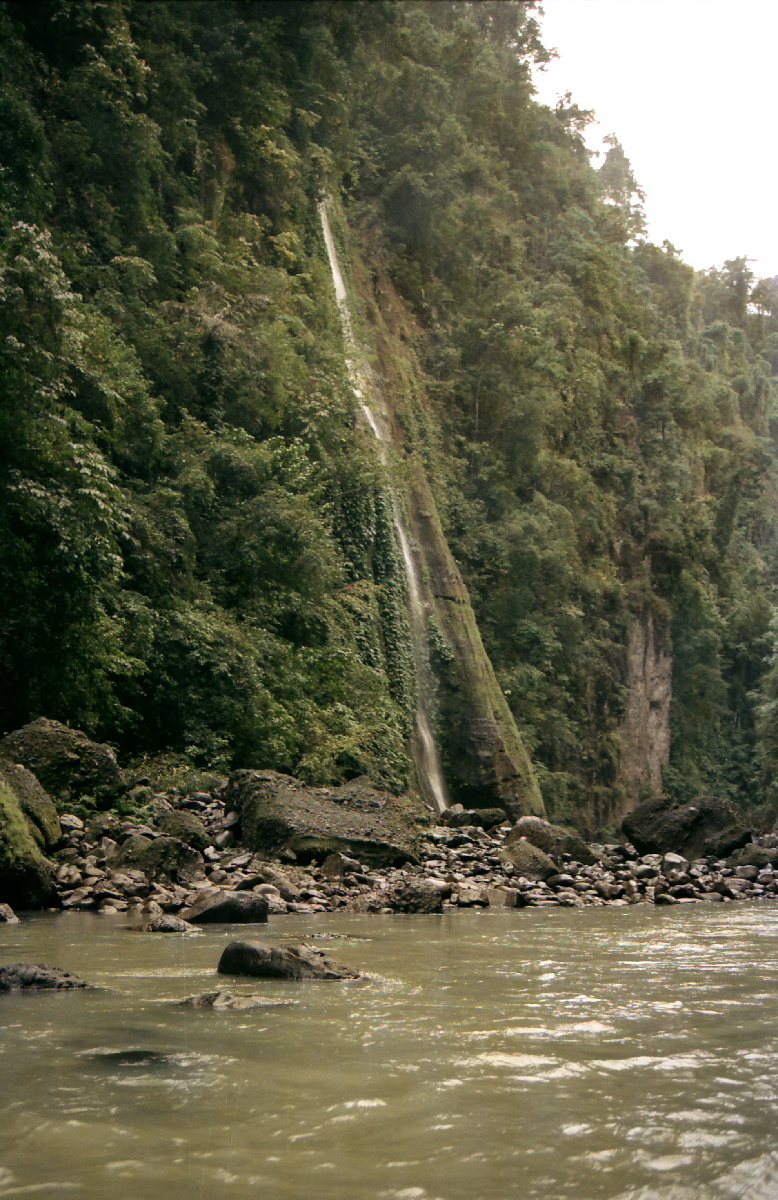
Talahib Falls is the first waterfall encountered by boat riders heading to Pagsanjan Falls

The falls are rich in legendary lore. One legend says there were no falls long ago, only the foliaged highlands, the Bumbungan and Balanac rivers, and the alluvial delta where the town of Pagsanjan now sits. On the eastern bank of the Bumbungan River lived two old brothers, named Balubad and Magdapio. For many years, they enjoyed a rustic life of peace and happiness. One day, a terrible drought brought ruin and death as no rains fell for months. The soil became dry as tinder, the flowers and plants withering away. Birds, deer, wild hogs, monkeys, and other animals disappeared as did rivers, creeks, and mineral springs.

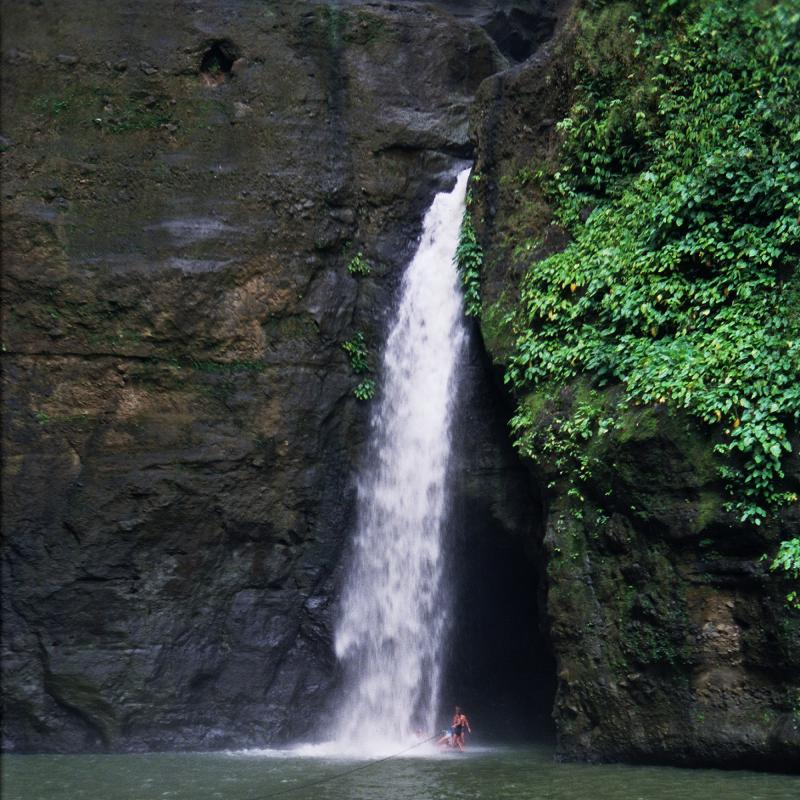
The visible and taller third drop

Balubad and Magdapio suffered immensely. Day and night they prayed for rain, but the gods did not heed them. The older and weaker of the two brothers, Balubad, died of thirst. A sorrowful Magdapio buried him on the slope of the mountain overlooking the river delta. This mountain is now called Balubad.

Left alone in a waterless world, Magdapio agonizingly trekked to the upper region of the arid riverbed. After an arduous journey he reached the high rocky cliffs, but to his disappointment, he found no water.

He sobbed bitterly and cried out "Ye gods! Where is the water?" In despair, he angrily hurled down his big cane at the rocks. Suddenly, a spring welled up on the spot where his cane fell. It quickly grew into a torrent of freshwater roaring down the canyon walls, becoming a booming waterfall. Amazed by this miracle, Magdapio fell on his knees and thanked the gods. He drank the cool water until he felt new energy surging in his blood. Thus emerged the falls of Cavinti.

== Access to the falls ==
=== Pagsanjan ===
The most popular way of reaching the falls is through the "Shooting the Rapids" boat ride, which originates from any of the resorts along Bumbungan and Balanac Rivers. Two skilled and licensed boatmen take one to three passengers on long, narrow wood or fiberglass canoes to the falls, which could take more than an hour of paddling upstream depending on traffic and water level. The journey takes passengers through the narrow and verdant Pagsanjan Gorge lined with huge boulders, rocks, and small waterfalls. The ride upstream ends in a natural pool below the falls where an optional raft ride takes visitors through the cascading water to the Devil's Cave behind the falls. The return trip called is a thrill ride through fourteen rapids, as the skilled boatmen maneuver the boat through the narrow rocks as it heads downstream.

=== Cavinti ===
It is also possible to hike the falls from the town of Cavinti, Laguna. The municipal government of Cavinti established the Pueblo El Salvador Nature's Park and Picnic Grove, in Barangay Tibatib on February 24, 2007, to capitalize on the popularity of Cavinti Falls, which is within the boundaries of the town. A few small falls are upriver by hiking from the park. The topmost stage of Cavinti Falls, known as Naculo Falls, can only be viewed from the viewing decks of the park. Only the top of the middle falls is visible from the park; the hidden second drop can only be viewed from the raft ride from below. To reach the main falls, there is a steep, steel ladder, which in one section goes vertically straight down. The raft to the falls and the "Shooting the Rapids" boat ride are also available from park management.

== See also ==
- List of waterfalls
- List of waterfalls in the Philippines
- Pagsanjan Falls stamp error
