= Pagsanjan Municipal Hall =

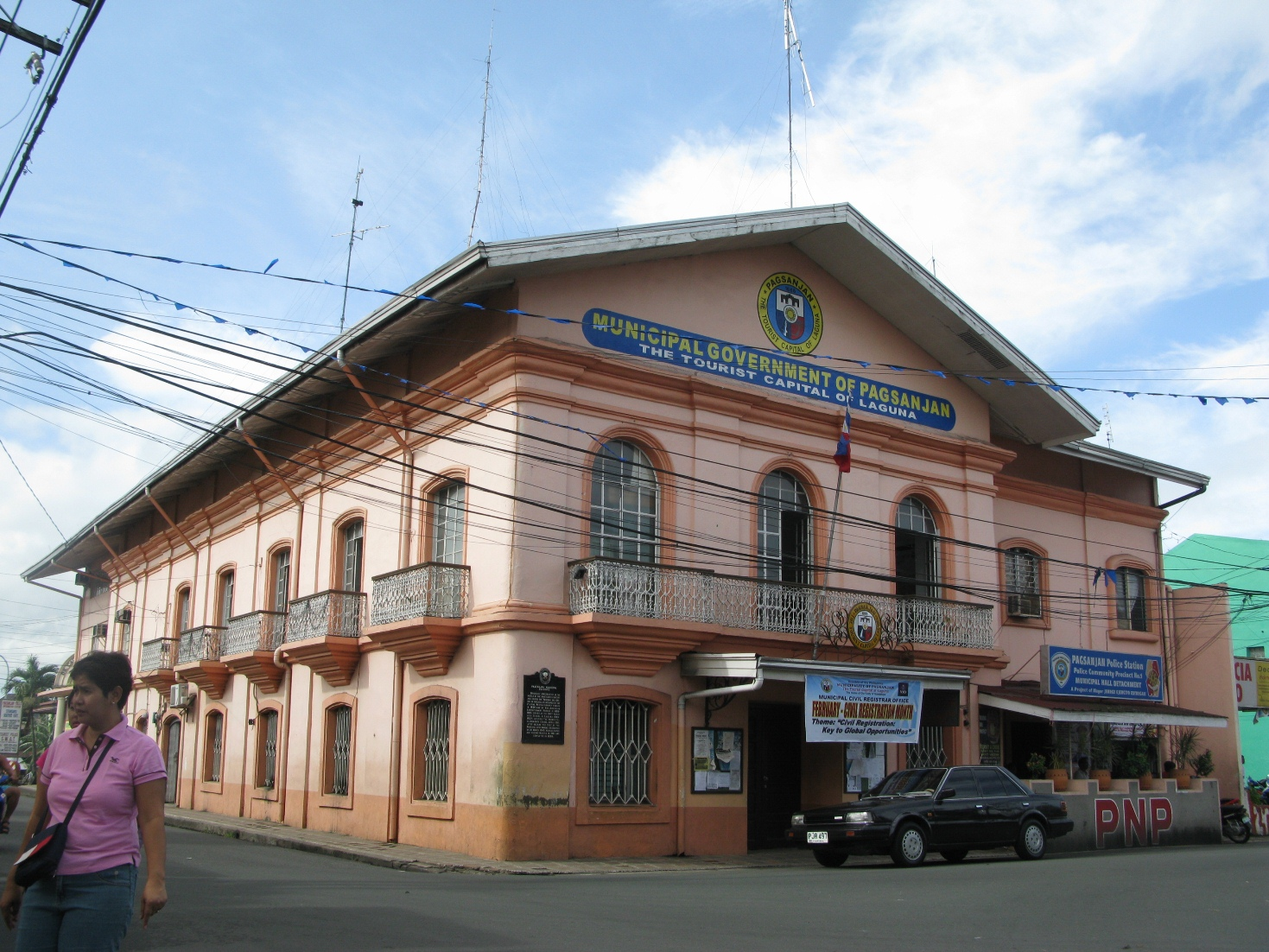
- Pagsanjan Municipal Building

- Location within Laguna Location within Luzon Location within Philippines

General information
- Status: Historic Site (Level II)
- Type: Government Center
- Location: Pagsanjan Municipal Building, JP Rizal Street, Poblacion Uno (Calle Real), Pagsanjan, Laguna, Philippines
- Coordinates: 14°16′21″N 121°27′21″E
- Renovated: 1951-1955
- Destroyed: 1945
- Owner: Local Government Unit of Pagsanjan

Technical details
- Material: Stones, Bricks and Wood

The Pagsanjan Municipal Hall is a mid-19th-century building located on J.P. Rizal Street in Poblacion Uno (Calle Real), Pagsanjan, Laguna, Philippines. It was home to the first public elementary school in Laguna Province from 1864 to 1911 as well as the first public high school from 1903 to 1907. The building currently houses the seat of the local government unit of the municipality of Pagsanjan.

== History ==
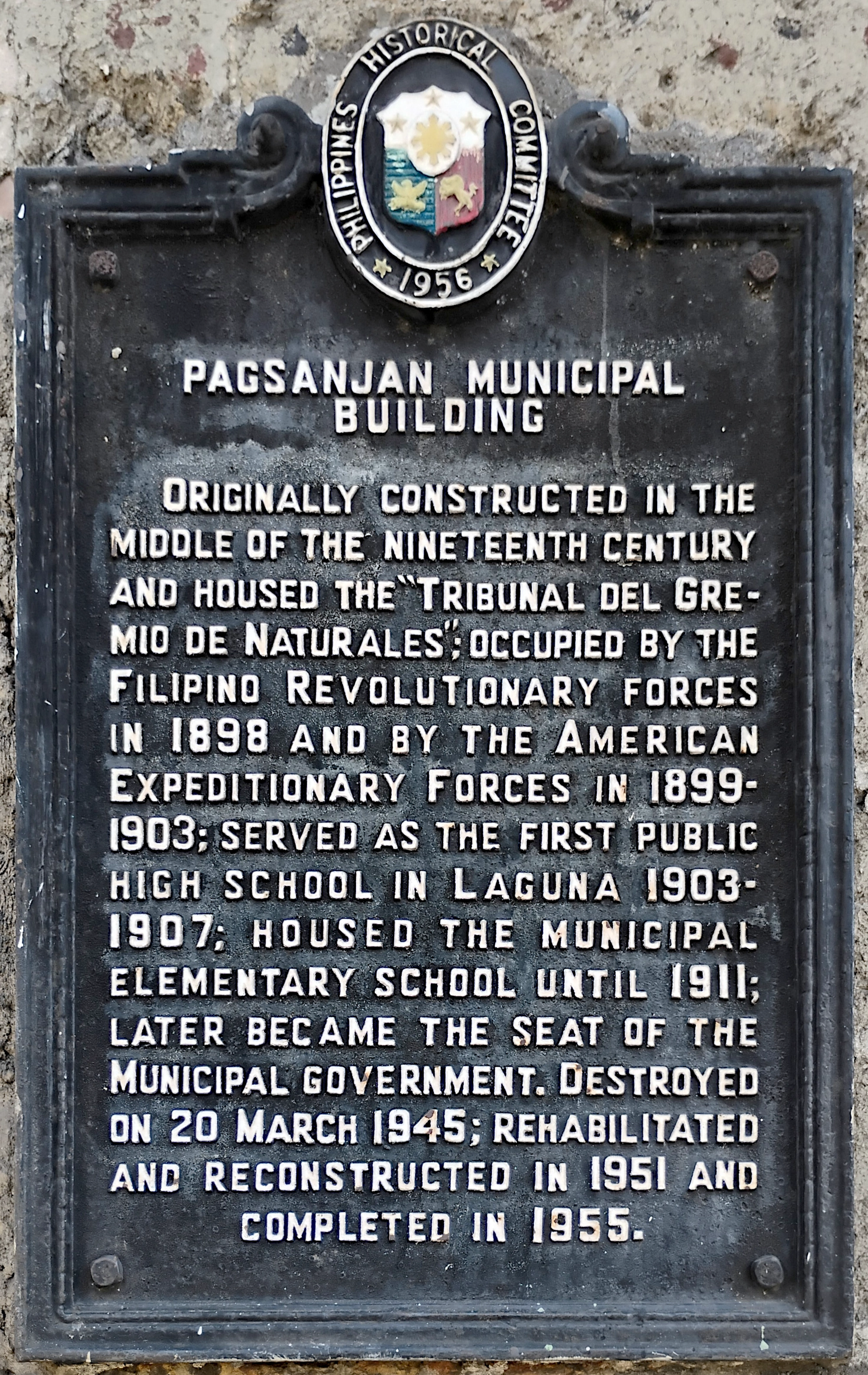
National historical marker installed in 1956

The building was first constructed during the middle of the 19th century and was used to house the Tribunal del Gremios de Naturales (Tribunal Court for the Local Government for Natives), a tribunal court of one of Pagsanjan's local government unit formed by the Spanish authorities during the 1600s. It served as quarters of the Filipino revolutionary forces under the leadership of Gen. Taino during the Philippine Revolution of 1898 and the American Expeditionary Forces during the Philippine–American War from 1899 to 1903. From 1903 to 1907, it housed the first public high school in Laguna under the American teachers known as Laguna High School before it was transferred to Santa Cruz. It also housed the first public elementary school from 1864 until 1911 pursuant to the Educational Decree of 1863 signed by Queen Regent Maria Cristina of Spain. It then became the seat of the government of Pagsanjan before it was destroyed during World War II on March 20, 1945. It was rehabilitated and reconstructed from 1951 and completed in 1955.
