= Bumbungan River =

River in Laguna, Philippines

Bumbungan River Pagsanjan River
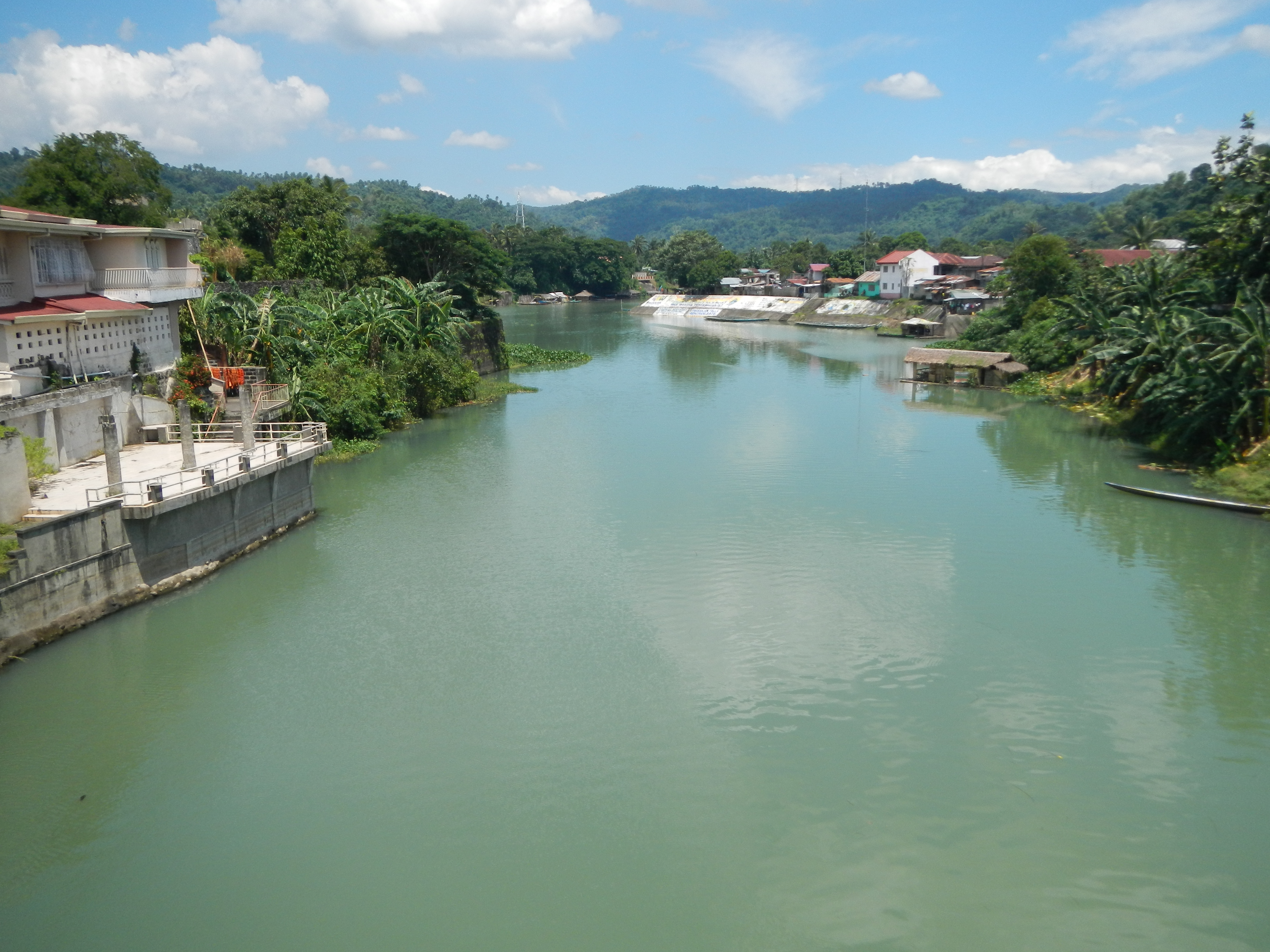
- The river in Pagsanjan

- Bumbungan River mouth Bumbungan River (Philippines)
- Native name: Ilog Bumbungan (Tagalog)

Location
- Country: Philippines
- Region: Calabarzon
- Province: Laguna
- City/municipality: Cavinti; Pagsanjan; Lumban

Physical characteristics
- Source
  - location: Sierra Madre mountains
  - elevation: about 430 metres (1,400 ft)
- Mouth: At the easternmost lobe of Laguna de Bay
  - location: Lumban, Laguna
  - coordinates: 14°20′10″N 121°25′12″E
  - elevation: less than 2 m (6 ft 7 in) above sea level
- Length: over 35 km (22 mi)
- Basin size: 311.77 square kilometres (120.38 sq mi)

Basin features
- Progression: Laguna de Bay – Pasig River – Manila Bay – South China Sea
- Tributaries
  - left: Balanac River; Colocolo River; Cavinti River
  - right: Lumot River

The Bumbungan River (Tagalog: Ilog Bumbungan) is a river in the province of Laguna in the Philippines. It is commonly referred to as the Pagsanjan River because of the popularity of the municipality of Pagsanjan and Pagsanjan Falls, one of the province's tourist destinations. The municipality of Pagsanjan was named so because it is where the Balanac River, originating from Mount Banahaw, joins the Bumbungan. Its old name, Pinagsangahan, which literally means branching, was changed to Pagsanjan during the Spanish Colonial Era.

The Bumbungan River originates from the Sierra Madre mountains, in the highlands of Cavinti, flowing through Pagsanjan and ending in Lumban where it drains to Laguna de Bay, the largest lake in the country. Bumbungan is one of 21 major tributaries of the lake and responsible for up to 35% of the water that flows into the lake. It is regularly monitored by the Laguna Lake Development Authority (LLDA) through one of its 15 river monitoring stations.

== Tourism ==
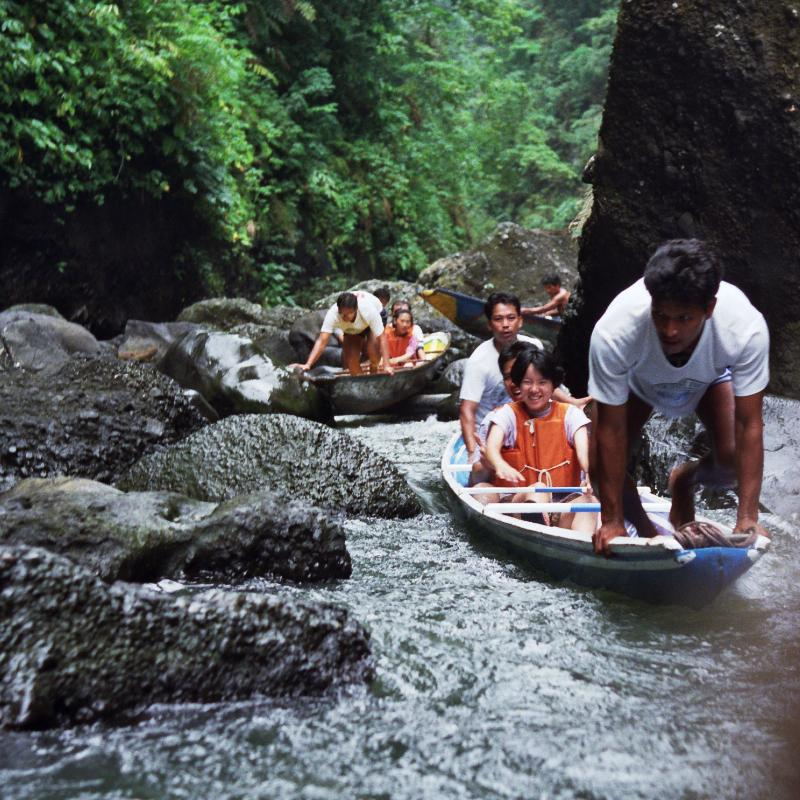
Shooting the rapids boat ride on the Bumbungan River

Located about 100 kilometres (62 mi) southeast of Manila, the Bumbungan River is a major tourist attraction within the Pagsanjan Gorge National Park with its rapids and waterfalls. For the people who live in Pagsanjan and Cavinti, the Bumbungan River is an important source of livelihood. In Pagsanjan, along the banks of Bumbungan are several hotels and resorts, some with views of the river, catering to visitors of the area.

=== Pagsanjan Falls ===
The waterfalls for which the Bumbungan river is famous is the Magdapio Falls, a section of the river in the town of Cavinti where the river drops about 300 feet (91 m). Because the original boat ride to reach the falls starts in Pagsanjan, it became known as the Pagsanjan Falls. This round trip boat ride consists of a 5.1-kilometre (3.2 mi) trip to the falls in a Filipino banca (dugout canoe with newer ones made with fiberglass), guided by a set of boatmen positioned at each end of the boat, as visitors are taken upriver passing through the narrow Pagsanjan Gorge, which gradually increase in elevation to over hundreds of feet high. The gorge is lined with trees, ferns, overhanging vines, rocks and boulders where varieties of fauna like birds, dragonflies, lizards and monkeys can be observed. The return trip, called Shooting the rapids, is a faster downriver ride as the skilled boatmen maneuvers the banca, avoiding rocks, as it glides through the rapids.

=== Cavinti Eco-Park ===
The Cavinti Eco-Park in Brgy. Tibatib, also known as Pueblo El Salvador Nature's Park and Picnic Grove, was opened by the government of Cavinti on February 24, 2007 to capitalize from the popularity of Pagsanjan Falls, which is located within its limits and generate income for its locals. The park offers an alternative for the visitors to the falls giving a shorter access to the falls from land and opening the upper Bumbungan River for hiking for interested individuals. Huts are rented out for picnickers and a viewing deck is also available for safely viewing Nakulo Falls, the uppermost waterfall of Pagsanjan Falls, and the top of the hidden second tier of Pagsanjan Falls. A long stairway and some rappeling takes visitors down to the floor of the gorge where they can take the raft that go under the falls or do the Shooting the rapids boat ride to Pagsanjan with the boatmen from Cavinti.

=== Bumbungan Eco-Park ===
Past the waterfalls and further upriver near the poblacion (town center) of Cavinti is a small park called the Bumbungan Eco-Park also in Brgy. Tibatib. The Bumbungan was dammed at this section where the top of the spillway also served as a wet bridge on the Lumban-Caliraya-Cavinti Road. After an adjacent bridge was constructed, the dam and adjacent land became the Eco-Park with huts for picnickers and bathroom facilities.

== Conservation ==
While the river itself appears quite clean to tourists, there is still considerable environmental concern. The LLDA notes that the Pagsanjan River Subwatershed is the second largest of the 21 sub basins that feed into Laguna de Bay, covering 311.77 square kilometres (120.38 sq mi), and since it feeds so much water into the lake, it is "one of the biggest contributors of pollution loading".

In the December 2005 Water Quality Status Report listed on the Laguna Lake Development Authority's site, the Pagsanjan River was listed as Class D, with high total coliform concentration. According to the Department of Environment and Natural Resources Water Usage & Classification for Fresh Water, Class D Quality freshwater is suitable for agriculture, irrigation, livestock watering and industrial water supply class II. The report also indicated that this status had been maintained since the river was last monitored.

The LLDA's conservation efforts for the major tributaries and watersheds of Laguna de Bay have led to the creation of the Laguna de Bay River Basin Councils, of which the Pagsanjan-Lumban River Basin Management &. Development Fdn. is particularly tasked with conservation of the Pagsanjan.

== In popular culture ==
- In the 1979 movie Apocalypse Now directed by Francis Ford Coppola, some of the scenes were shot along the Bumbungan River.

== See also ==
- Laguna de Bay
- Laguna Lake Development Authority
