= Francisco Maniago =

Filipino revolutionary leader

- Known for: 1660 revolt in Pampanga

Francisco Maniago was a 17th-century Filipino revolutionary leader who fought the Spanish colonisation of the Philippines. He led a 1660 revolt in the province of Pampanga attacking the bandala system, where locals were forced to sell agricultural products at low prices, and polo y servicio, a form of corvée where locals worked on government projects without pay.

== Revolt ==
Under polo y servicio, men in Pampanga worked as timber cutters for eight months, which led to low agricultural harvests. To show their opposition against the forced labor system, the men set their campsite on fire, and chose Francisco Maniago, the chief from Mexico, Pampanga, as their leader.

Under Maniago, the revolting group closed the mouths of the rivers with stakes to disrupt commerce. They also sent letters to chiefs in provinces outside of Pampanga, asking to join the revolt against Spain.

Maniago's revolt was however short-lived. He made peace with the Spanish governor-general Sabiniano Manrique de Lara, and was never heard from again. According to one account, he and his brother were killed.
