= Pagsanjan Arch =

- Arco Real
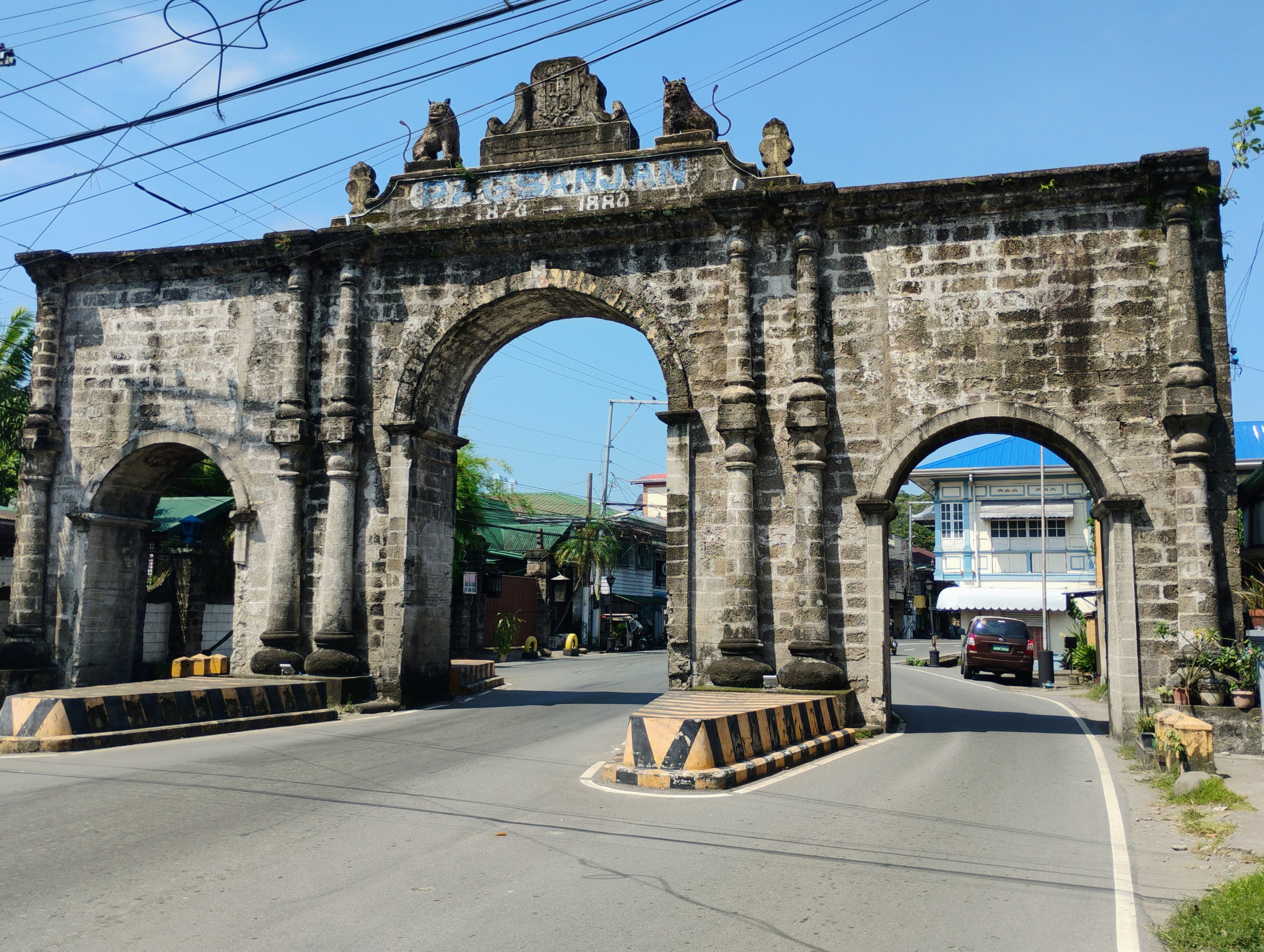
- Western facade of the Arco Real

- Location within Laguna Location within Luzon Location within Philippines
- Alternative names: Puerto Real

General information
- Status: Completed
- Type: Triumphal arch
- Architectural style: Roman
- Location: Rizal St., Pagsanjan, Laguna, Philippines
- Coordinates: 14.273283°N 121.449060°E
- Construction started: 1878
- Completed: 1880

Technical details
- Material: Adobe, Lime, Carabao milk

Pagsanjan Arch also known as Puerto Real or Arco Real is a historic town gate of Pagsanjan, Laguna, Philippines built from 1878 to 1880 under the supervision of Fray Cipriano Bac. The arch was built by the people of Pagsanjan to express gratitude to their patroness, the Our Lady of Guadalupe, from protecting the town from bandits in 1877.

== Location ==
The arch is located at the western entrance of the town along the National Highway. It leads to Rizal Street (formerly Calle Real) of the town.

== History ==
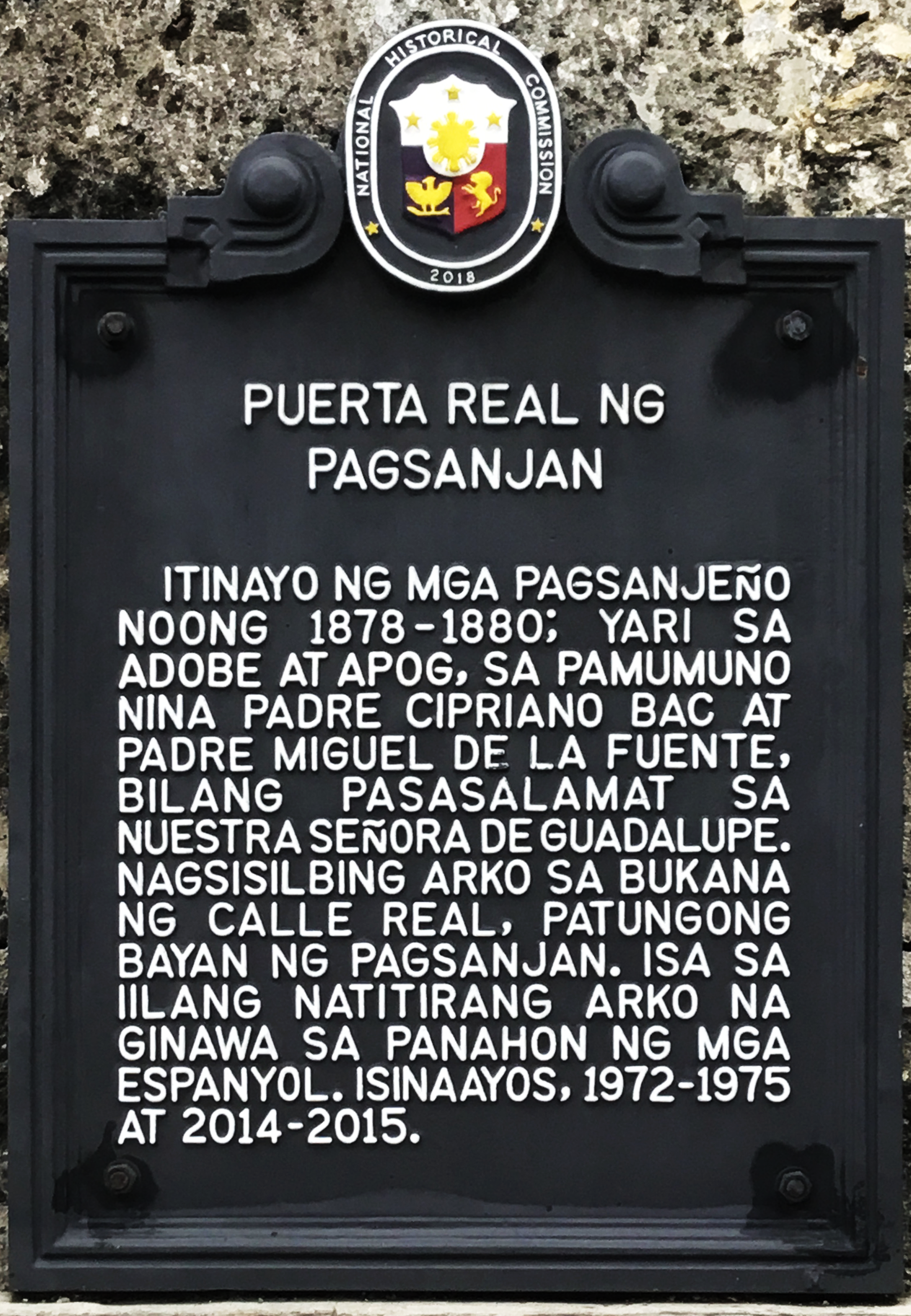
Historical marker

=== Bandits and the Virgin of Guadalupe ===
Bandits (termed tulisanes) were rampant in Laguna during the last years of Spanish colonization. Even the Guardia Civil at that time cannot control the acts of the tulisanes. At midnight of December 8, 1877, a group of bandits led by a certain Tangkad (literally, “tall”) who had already plundered the nearby town of Majayjay, were at the western edge of Pagsanjan. As the bandits approached the town, they saw a beautiful lady in white brandishing a shining sword, with which she drew a line in the ground, proclaiming the town to be under her protection. The terrified bandits immediately fled to the mountains; a man named Mang Juan, a sabungero who lived nearby, saw the whole event because of his insomnia. He told the event to the Spanish parish priest who reported it to sceptical authorities. On investigating the site, they saw the mark of the Virgin's sword, and believed. To express their gratitude to their patroness, the Virgin of Guadalupe, they built a stone gate on the exact site where the Virgin drew the line with her sword.

=== Construction and restoration of the Arch ===
Under the supervision of the Franciscan Cipriano Bac and Don Manuel de Yriarte, Pagsanjan Arch was built from 1878 to 1880 by the townspeople through forced labor or polo y servicio. It was also known as Puerta Real or Royal Gate during the Spanish era and American occupation.

During the Japanese liberation of the town, municipal authorities vandalized the historic gate by having it painted a gaudy pink, including the coat-of-arms and the two Castilian lions. The word Pagsanjan and the years of its construction, 1878–1880, written below it on the upper part of the gate's western façade were defaced and replaced with the greeting, "Welcome", and on the eastern side, "Thank U, Come Again". Historian Gregorio F. Zaide, a native of the town, started a project to restore the historic gate through Pagsanjeños in Manila who generously gave ₱5,000. Upon obtaining permission from the National Historic Institute (now National Historical Commission of the Philippines), the restoration process commenced under the supervision of Engr. Tito Rivera and was completed on May 25, 1975. A large copper plaque was placed on the wall of the first arch to commemorate the donors. Today, the Arch still straddles a main thoroughfare of the town.

== Architectural style ==
Pagsanjan arch is well known for its three Roman arches or gates made of adobe stones, lime and carabao milk. On top of the arch is the Royal coat-of-arms of Spain (or escutcheon) in gold and yellow guarded by two red Castilian lions.

== Heritage designation ==
The arch was declared as a historic structure by the National Historical Commission of the Philippines on December 6, 2018 with the unveiling of a historical marker.

== See also ==
- Diocesan Shrine of Our Lady of Guadalupe
