= Polo y servicio =

Forced labor in Spanish Philippines

Polo y Servicio, or more accurately termed the Repartimiento, also known as the prestación personal, was the corvée system with compensation imposed upon the local population in the Spanish East Indies and Spanish America during the Spanish colonial period.

The word polo refers to community work, and the laborer was called polista. The community activities that polistas have to perform may include cutting trees for timber, and building Galleon trade ships, churches, government buildings, paving roads, and bridges.

Polo y servicio was mandatory for males from 16 to 60 years old, for a 40-day period per year. The laborers could be sent to any community project, and anyone who refused was fined and imprisoned.

== History ==
The Repartimiento (Polo y servicio) was imposed on the local indigenous male population in the Philippines since the late sixteenth century.

In 1863, a strong earthquake struck Manila, and killed more than a thousand people and destroyed much of the city. To support with the city reconstruction, a decree was promulgated to expand it to Spaniards and other resident foreigners in the Spanish East Indies.

In 1867, the Spanish colonial government mandated male Chinese residing in the Philippines between 18 and 60 years old, to render forced labor. Similar to the local population, the Chinese labourers were tasked with working on churches, government buildings, and roads. Chinamen who had the money preferred paying the falla of 3 pesos to be exempted from forced labour on top of the double tax (15 pesos for mestizos sangleyes) or quadruple tax (30 pesos for sangleyes) permanently resident in the islands.

== Infrastructure built ==
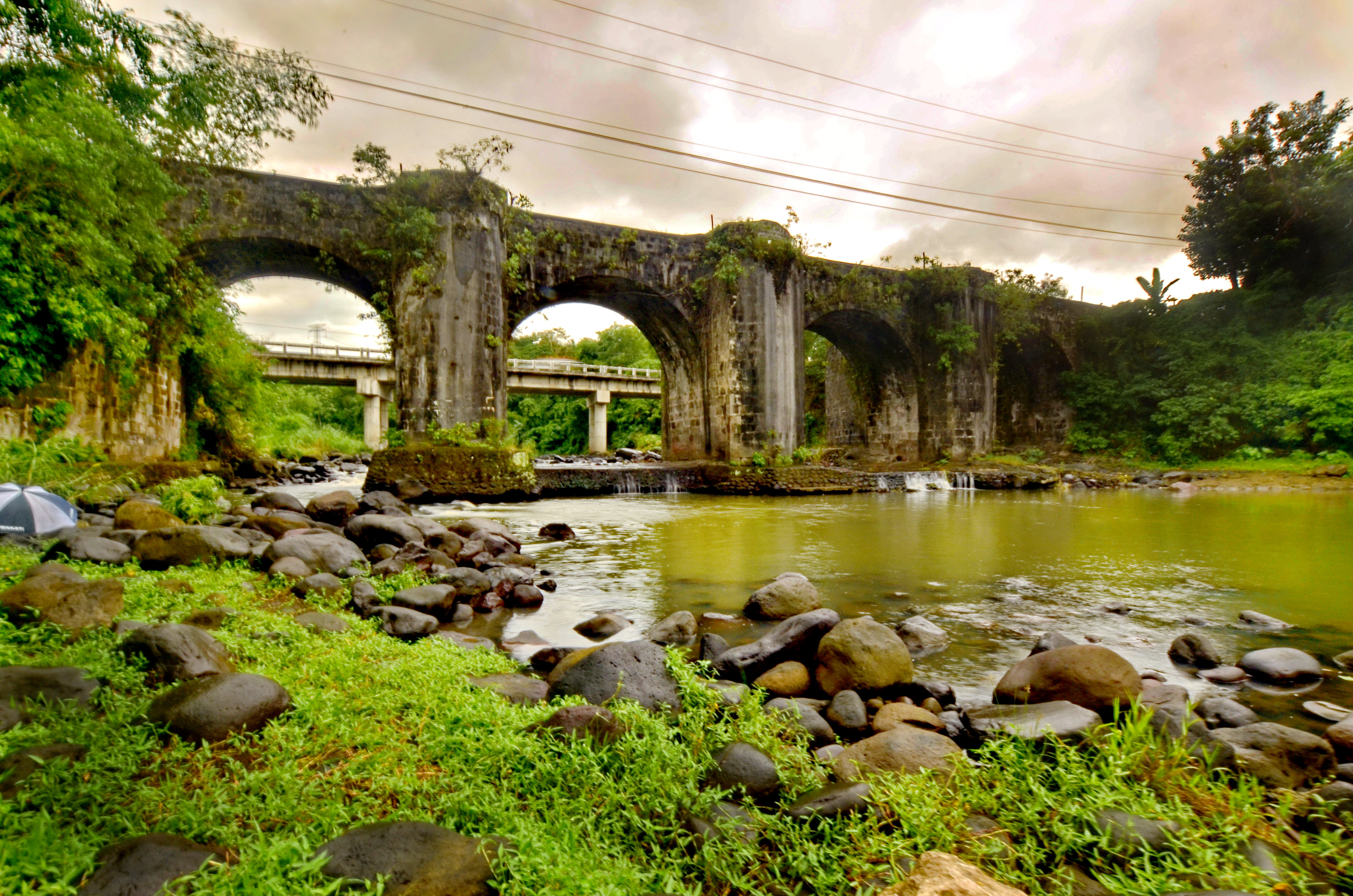
Malagonlong Bridge

Polo y Servicio was employed for the construction of several churches and government projects in the Philippines during the Spanish colonial period, such as:

- Angeles Church in Pampanga
- Pagsanjan Arch in Laguna
- Maribojoc Church in Bohol
- Malagonlong Bridge in Quezon

== Impact ==
For colonial Spain, the forced labor system was necessary to establish a reliable source of labor in the Philippines. It was also a source for government revenue as males who evaded polo y servicio had to pay the base falla, amounting to 1½ reales per day, totalling 60 reales or 7½ pesos per calendar year.

However, the system crippled the ability of the local male population to feed themselves and their families, which caused hunger. In particular, the system affected the agricultural sector because of the lack of male farmers, which resulted in low harvests.

Moreover, it led to injury and death of many men working in hazardous projects.

Polo y servicio also resulted in numerous rebellions and movements against colonial Spain, such as:

=== Sumuroy Rebellion ===
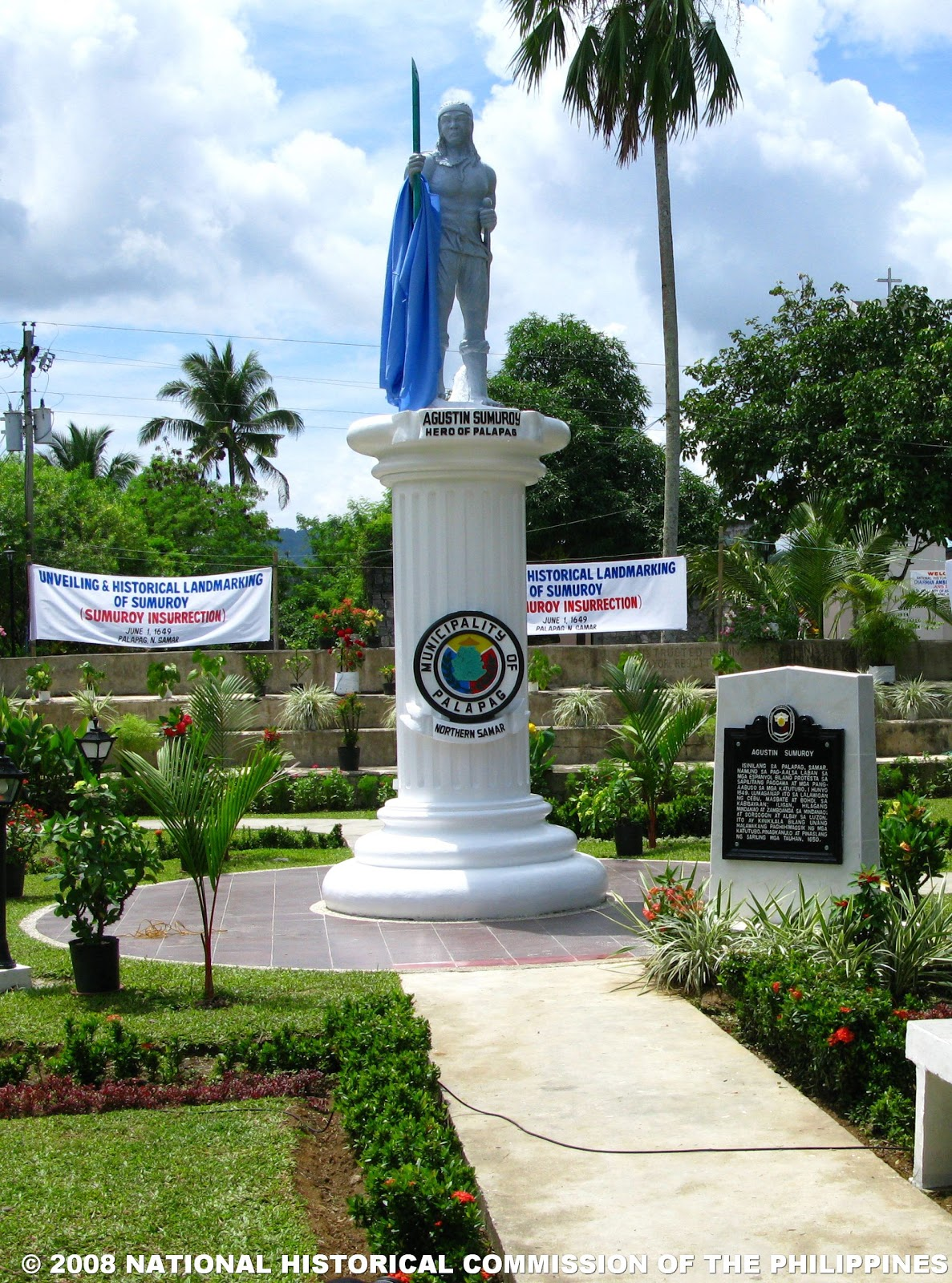
Sumuroy monument

In Northern Samar, Agustin Sumuroy held a rebellion against polo y servicio on 1649. He rebelled against the sending of his fellowmen to the shipyards in Cavite, which is quite far from his hometown in Northern Samar. A rebel government was successfully established in the mountains, however he was captured and executed in 1650.

=== Maniago Revolt ===
In Pampanga, Francisco Maniago rebelled in 1660 due to forced labor. His fellowmen were made to work for eight months as timber cutters and were not paid. Maniago mutinied and set their campsite on fire. As a result, he and Governor-General Sabiniano Manrique de Lara met to negotiate conditions to end the rebellion.

=== Dagohoy Revolution ===
In Bohol, Francisco Dagohoy, from 1744 to 1829, led the longest revolution against Spain in the Philippine history. Polo y servicio is one of the reasons for Dagohoy's revolution.

=== Cavite Mutiny ===
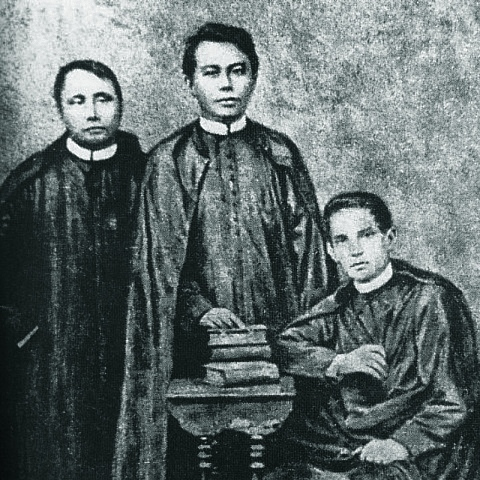
Left to right: Jacinto Zamora, Mariano Gómez, and José Burgos

Governor-General Carlos María de la Torre granted privileges to arsenal laborers in Fort San Felipe in Cavite, like exemption from paying tributes and rendering forced labor. However, Rafael Izquierdo withdrew these privileges when he succeeded de la Torre. This triggered the Cavite Mutiny in 1872.

The mutiny was immediately suppressed, but three Filipino priests, Mariano Gómez, José Burgos, and Jacinto Zamora—collectively known as Gomburza—were implicated as the masterminds behind the mutiny and executed by garrote that same year.

=== Propaganda Movement ===
The Propaganda Movement was consisted of several prominent Filipinos, such as José Rizal, Graciano Lopez Jaena, Mariano Ponce, and Marcelo del Pilar. Established in 1880–1895, the propagandists started the formation of a nationalist ideology in the Philippines. Among the aims of the movement was to abolish the corvée.

== Abolition ==
The corvée or repartimiento (Polo y servicio) was eventually abolished in 1898 after the Americans took control of the Spanish East Indies.
