= Pagsanjan =

Municipality in Laguna, Philippines

Pagsanjan Pinagsangahan
- Municipality
- Municipality of Pagsanjan
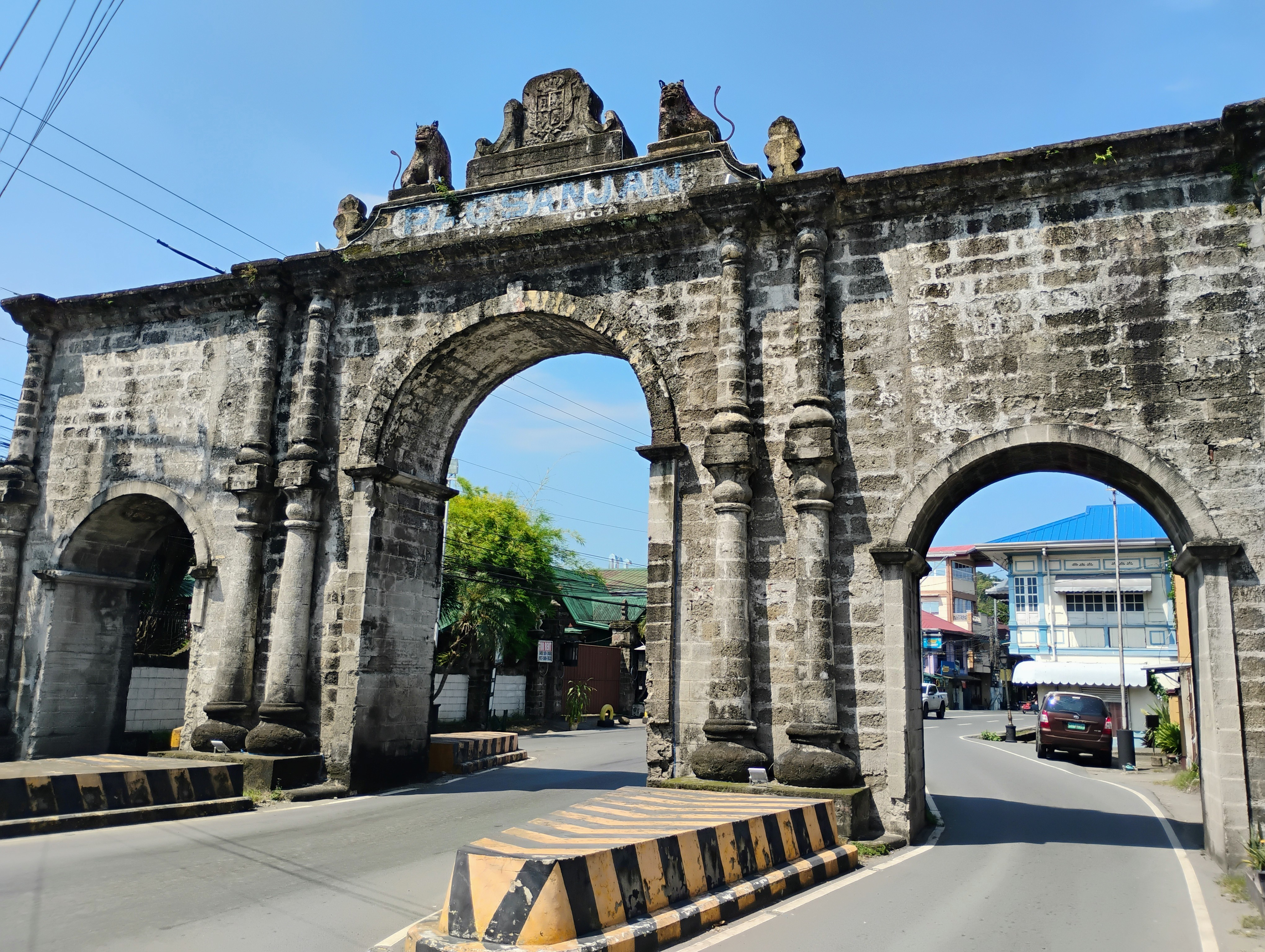
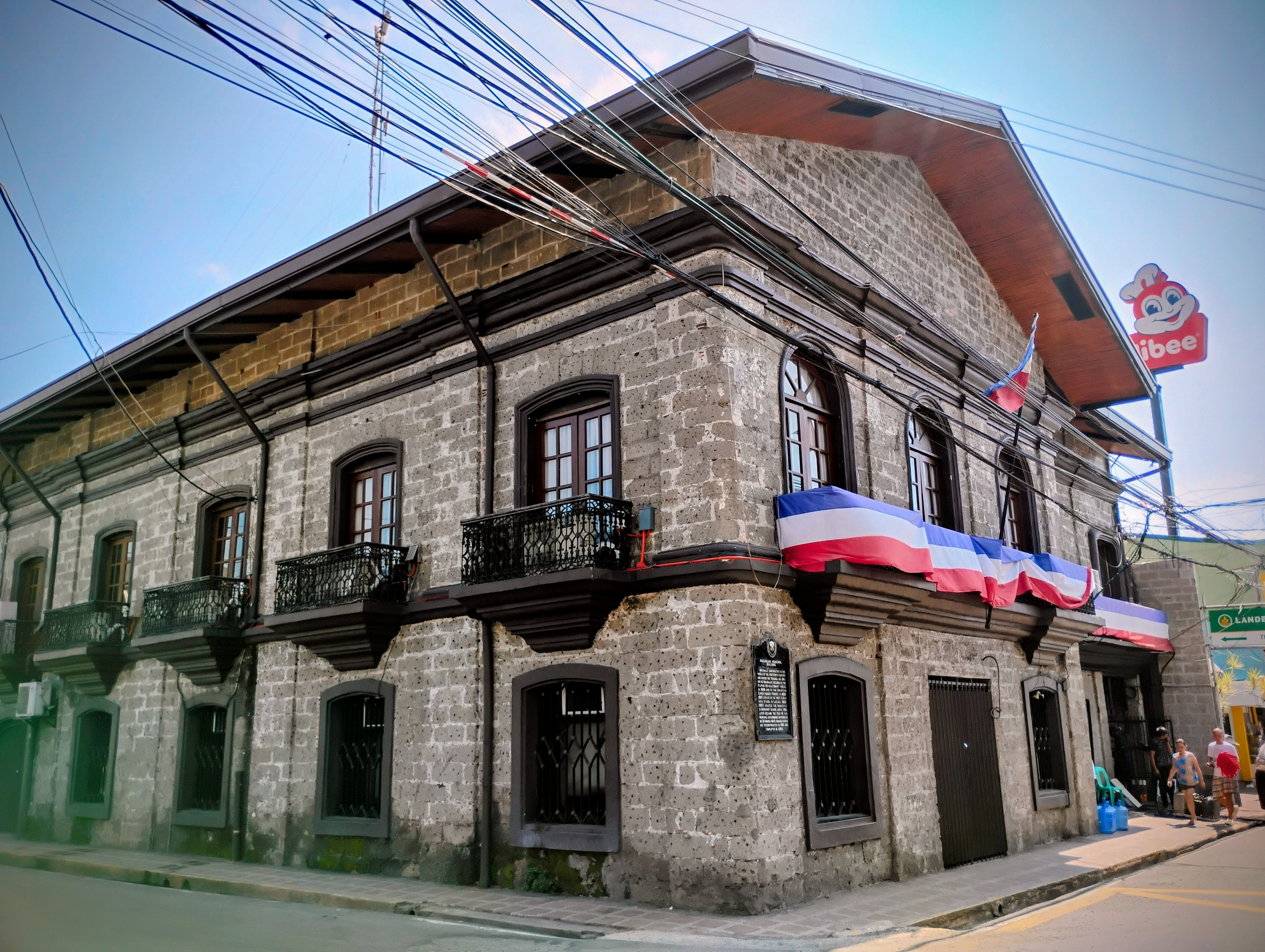
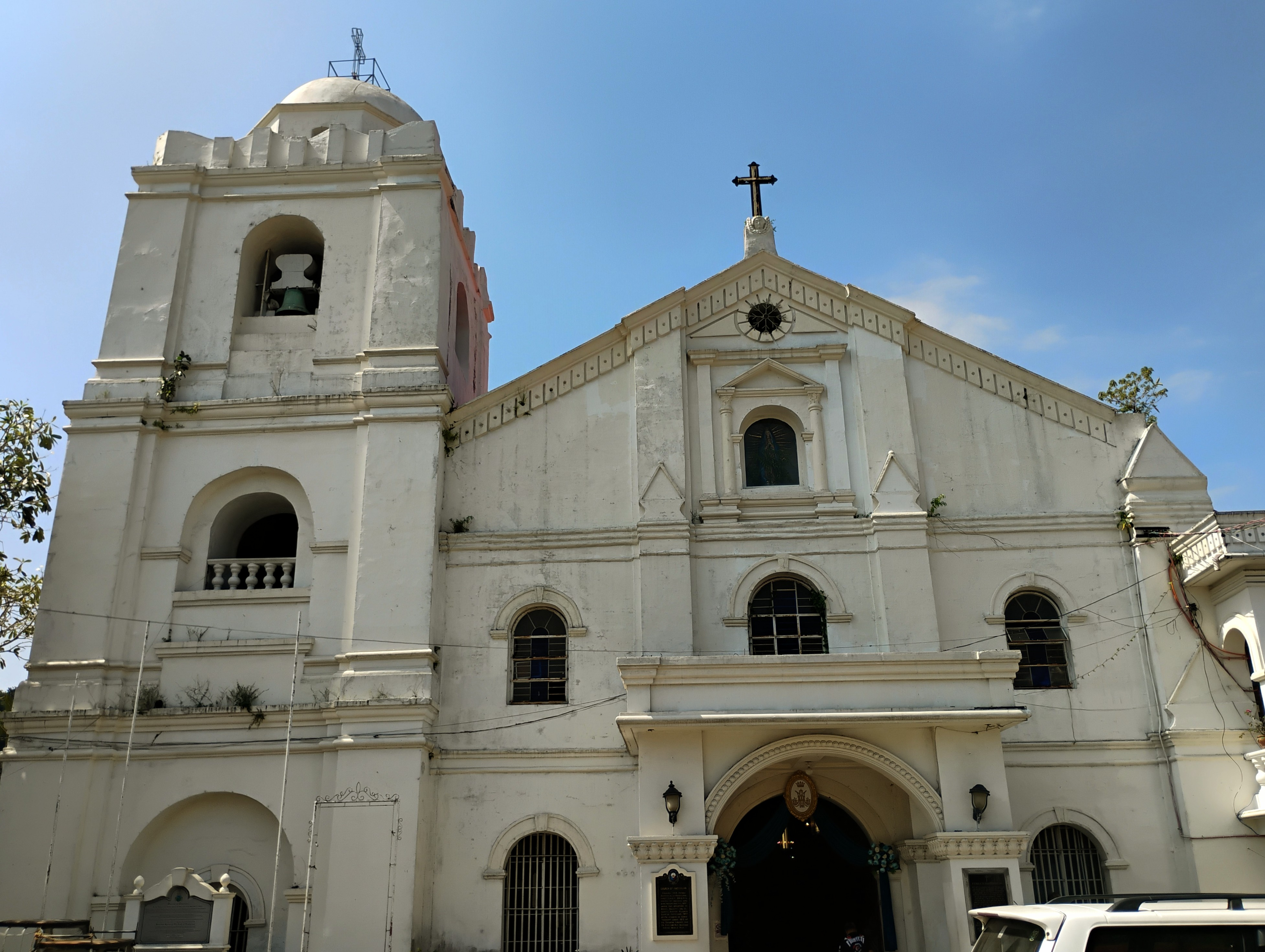
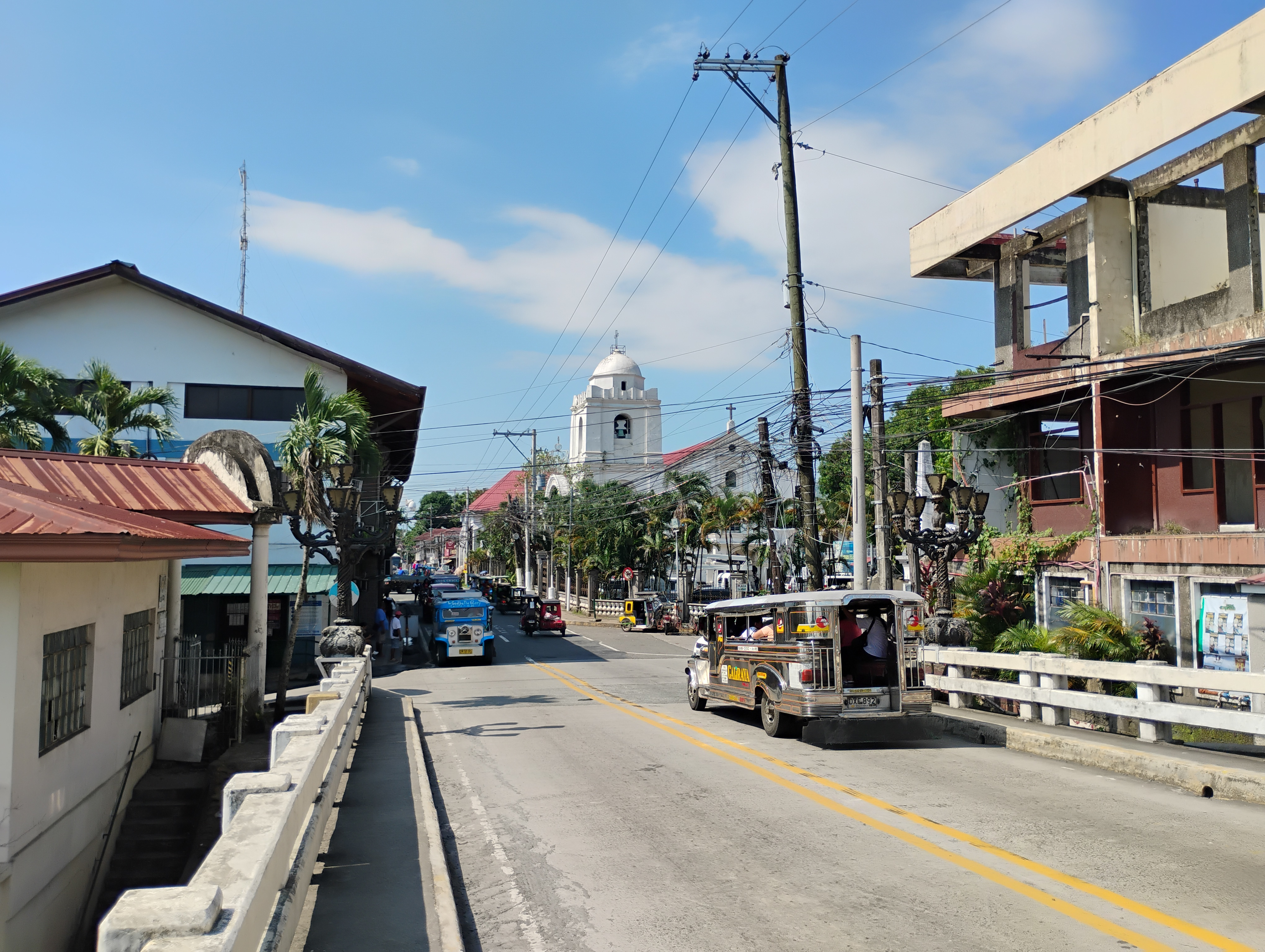
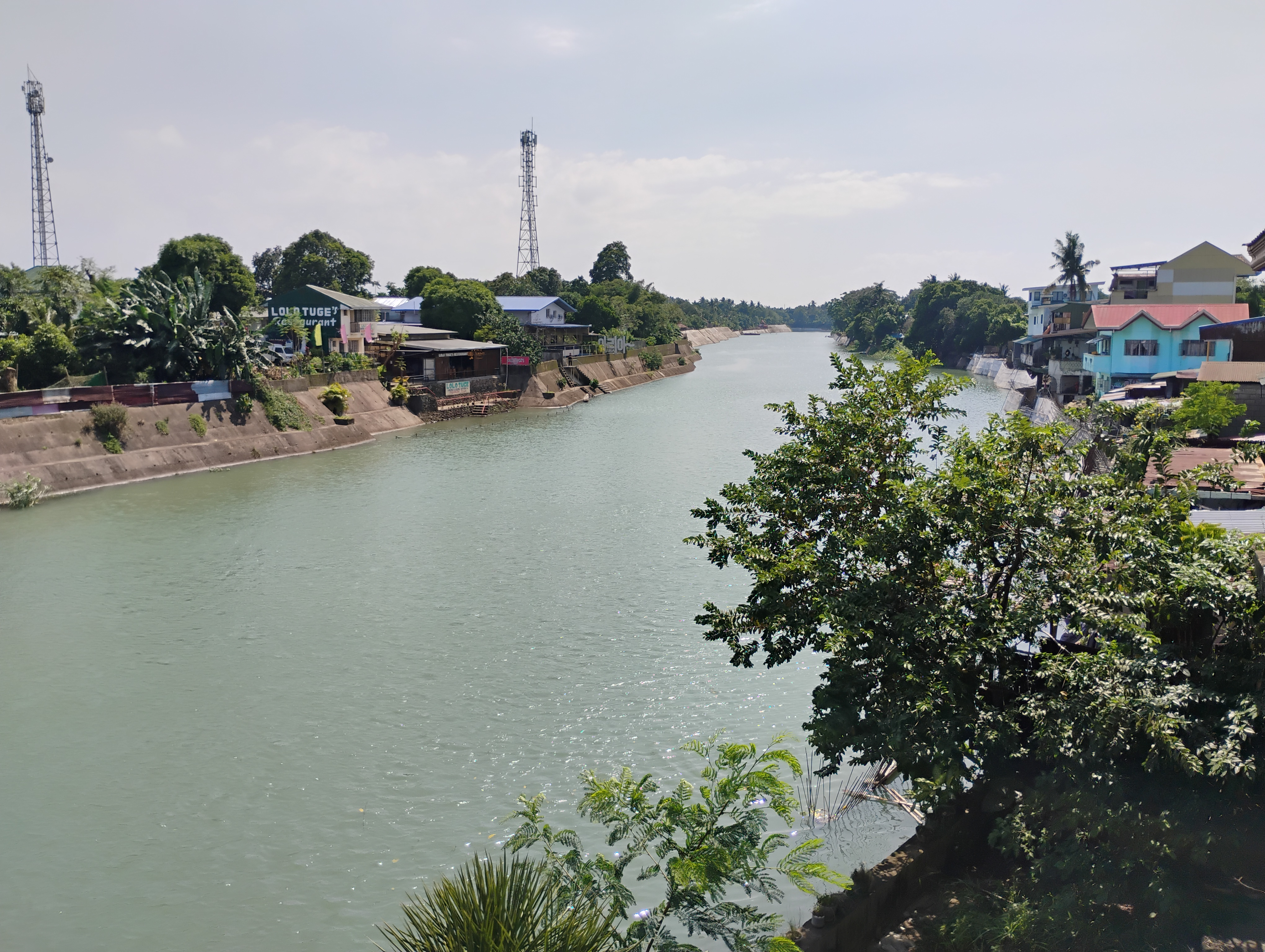
- Pagsanjan Arch Pagsanjan Municipal Building Our Lady of Guadalupe Parish Church Pagsanjan Town Proper Balanac River

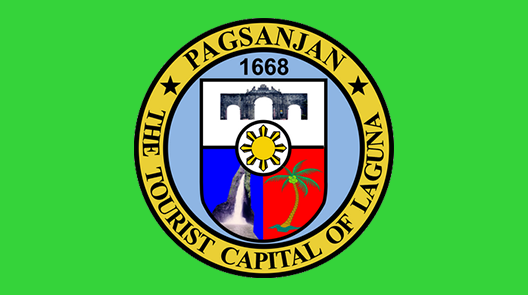
- Flag Seal
- Nicknames: Tourist Capital of Laguna; Athens of Laguna; Home of Our Lady of Guadalupe de Filipinas
- Motto: I ❤️ PagsanJAN!
- Map of Laguna with Pagsanjan highlighted
- Interactive map of Pagsanjan
- Location within the Philippines
- Coordinates: 14°16′N 121°27′E
- Country: Philippines
- Region: Calabarzon
- Province: Laguna
- District: 4th district
- Founded: December 12, 1668
- Barangays: 16 (see Barangays)

Government
  - Type: Sangguniang Bayan
  - Mayor: Januario Ferry G. Garcia
  - Vice Mayor: Rod H. Fernandez
  - Representative: Benjamin Cueto "Benjie" Agarao Jr.
  - Municipal Council: Members: John Paul J. Ejercito; Allan Q. Arroyo; Dennis Dale V. Gonzales; Noel L. Cabela; Nathaniel C. Bernales II; Ronie S. Leron; Melvin B. Madriaga
  - Electorate: 33,055 voters

Area
  - Total: 26.36 km^{2} (10.18 sq mi)
- Elevation: 149 m (489 ft)
- Highest elevation: 492 m (1,614 ft)
- Lowest elevation: 1 m (3.3 ft)

Population (2024 census)
  - Total: 45,602
  - Density: 1,730/km^{2} (4,481/sq mi)
  - Households: 11,404

Economy
  - Income class: 2nd municipal income class
  - Poverty incidence: 8.96% (2023)
  - Revenue: ₱ 233.6 million (2024)
  - Assets: ₱ 311.1 million (2024)
  - Expenditure: ₱ 102.1 million (2024)
  - Liabilities: ₱ 95.11 million (2024)

Service provider
  - Electricity: First Laguna Electric Cooperative (FLECO)
- Time zone: UTC+8 (PST)
- ZIP code: 4008
- PSGC: 0403419000
- IDD : area code: +63 (0)49
- Native languages: Tagalog
- Website: www.pagsanjan.gov.ph

Pagsanjan (/ˈpəɡsənhɑːn/ PAG-sang-han), officially the Municipality of Pagsanjan (Tagalog: Bayan ng Pagsanjan), is a municipality in the province of Laguna, Philippines. According to the 2024 census, it has a population of 45,602 people.

It is known as the tourist capital of Laguna and is the home of the Bangkero Festival held every March. The bangkeros are tour guides who steer boats along the river to Pagsanjan Falls (also called Magdapio Falls), for which the town is well known but is actually in neighboring Cavinti.

The municipality was the capital of the province of Laguna for 170 years (from 1688 to 1858), during which the town prospered as the commercial, cultural and learning center of the province.

== Etymology ==
Pagsanjan is located in the riparian delta formed by the confluence of the Balanac and Bumbungan rivers. Originally called Pinágsangahán ("branching" or "juncture"), the name was shortened to "Pagsanjan" by early Spanish colonists because they found it very difficult to pronounce.

== History ==
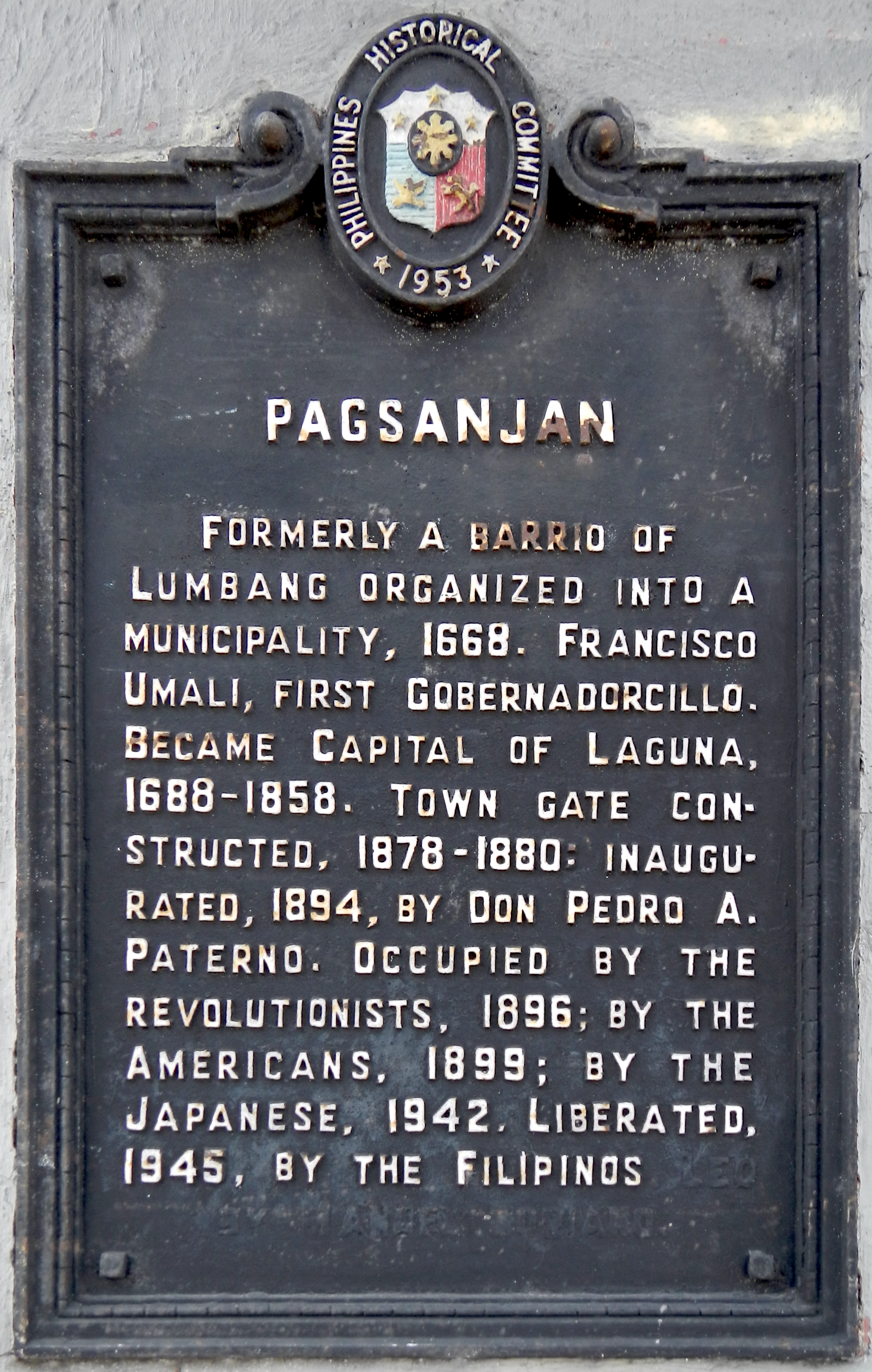
National historical marker installed at the town arch in 1953

In 1668, eight Japanese and Chinese traders, highly impressed by the barrio's strategic location at the junction of the Balanac and Bumbungan rivers, founded the town. They established a trading settlement and engaged in the betel nut industry. In time, the barrio became the flourishing trading center of eastern Laguna and attracted families from the surrounding communities of Cavinti and Pila. On December 12, 1668, then-Governor-General Juan Manuel de la Peña Bonifaz issued a decree elevating its status to a town. In 1688, Pagsanjan replaced Bay as the capital of the province. It remained such until 1858. The 1818 Spanish census recorded the area as having 1,785 native families and 7 Spanish-Filipino families (newly immigrated from Spain).

=== List of mayors ===
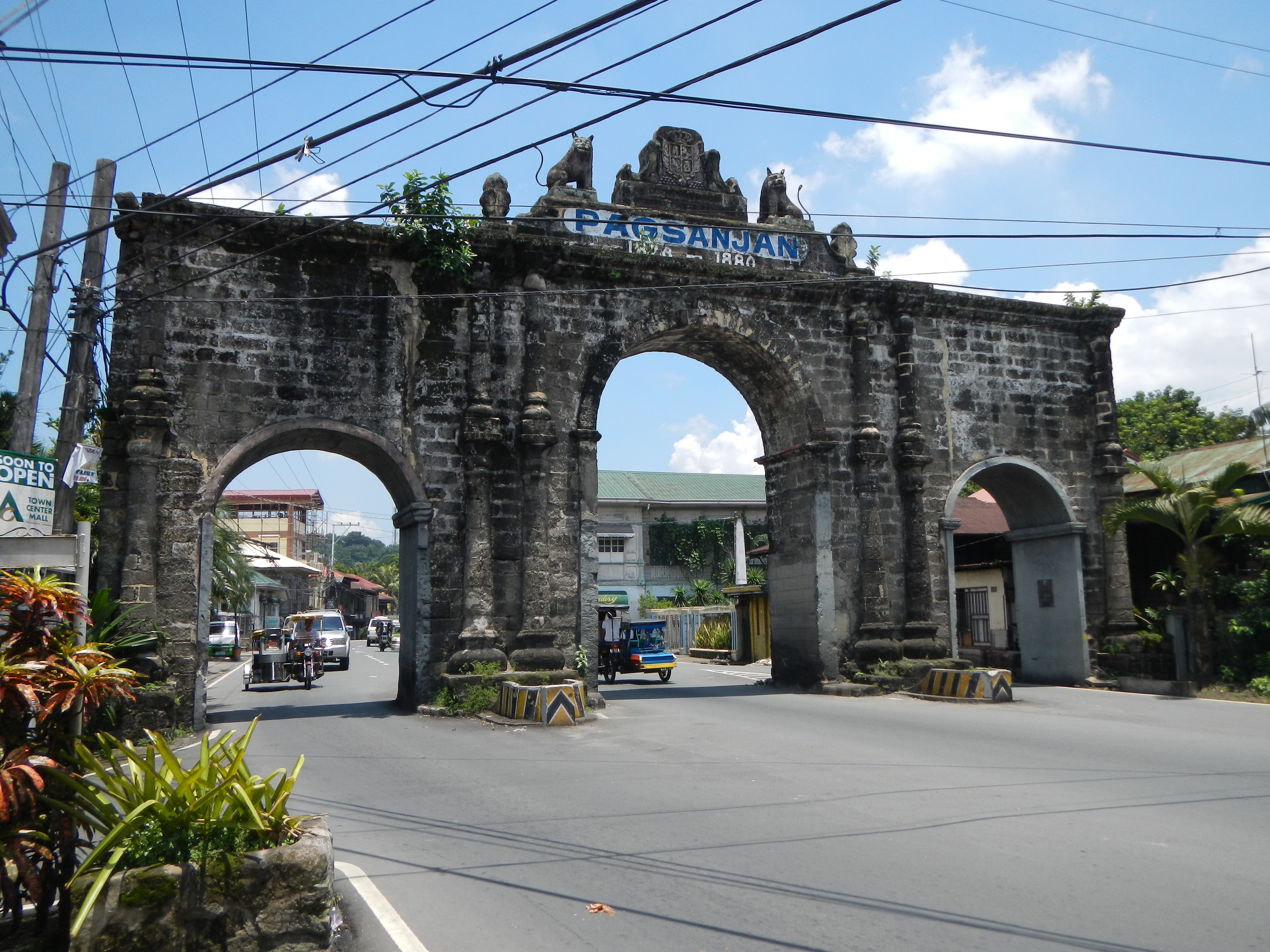
Old Town Gate

- Juan L. Fabella
- Fidelino C. Agawin (1959–1963)
- Quintin Cabrera (1963–1971)
- Gregorio F. Zaide (1971–1975)
- Adelina Becina Gabatan
- Hernando Zaide (1986–1987)
- Augusto Kamatoy (1988–1998)
- Abner L. Afuang (1998–2001)
- Girlie Yulatic Javier-Ejercito (2010-2019)
- Peter Casius Trinidad (2019–2022)
- Cesar V. Areza (2022–2025)
- E. R. Ejercito (2001–2010 and 2025)

== Geography ==
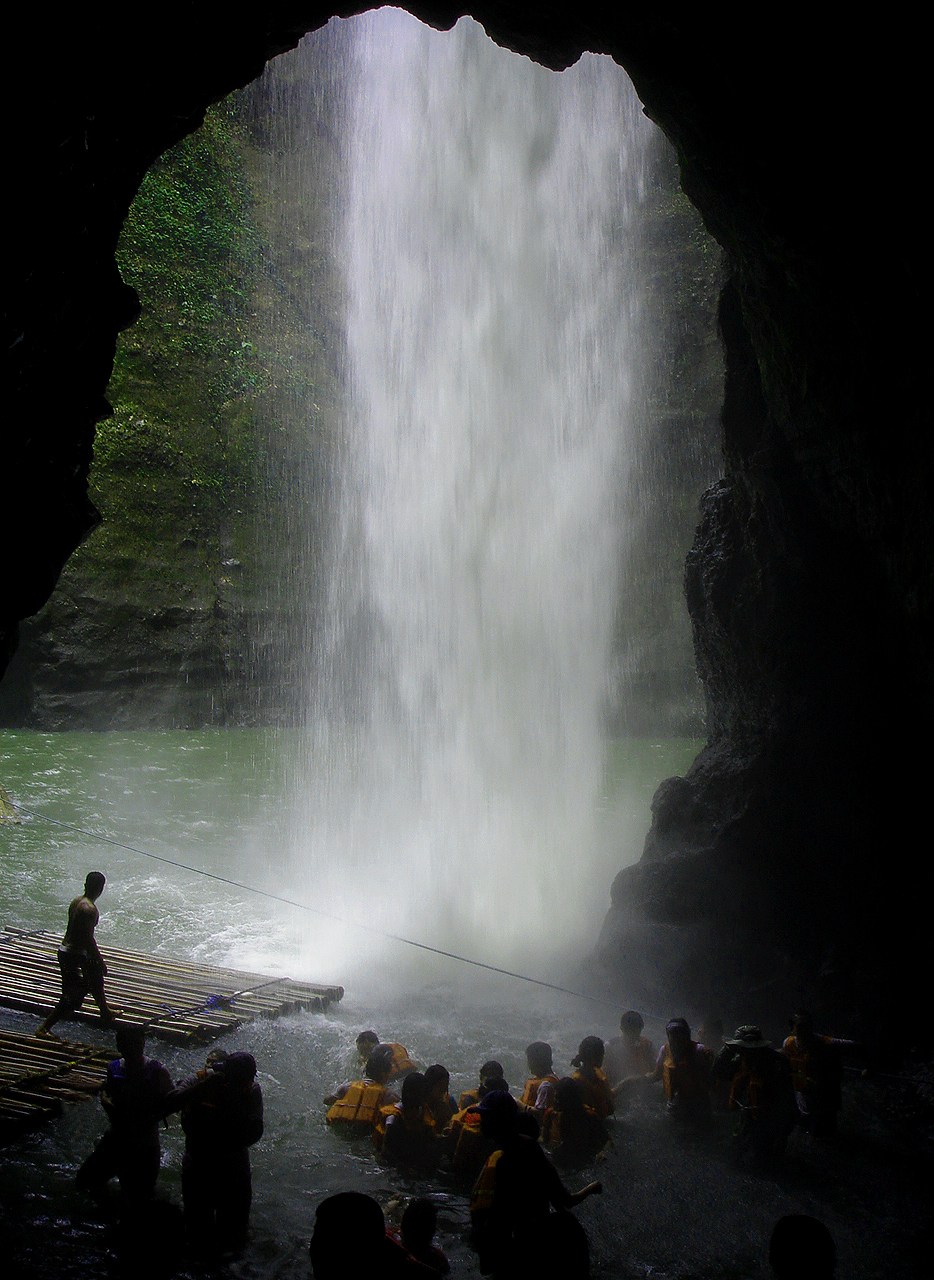
Pagsanjan Falls

Pagsanjan has a land area of 26.4 square kilometers (10.2 mi^{2}). It is bounded on the east by the Balubad Mountain; on the west by the provincial capital of Santa Cruz; on the north by the San Isidro Hill and Laguna de Bay; on the north-east by the town of Lumban; on the southeast by the towns of Cavinti and Luisiana; on the south by Mount Banahaw; and on the south-west by the town of Magdalena.

Situated 4 kilometers (2.5 mi) from Santa Cruz, 91 kilometers (57 mi) southeast of Manila, and 52 kilometers (32 mi) from Lucena, this town is reached via the Manila East Road or SLEX.

=== Barangays ===
Pagsanjan is politically subdivided into 16 barangays, as indicated below and in the image herein. Each barangay consists of puroks and some have sitios.

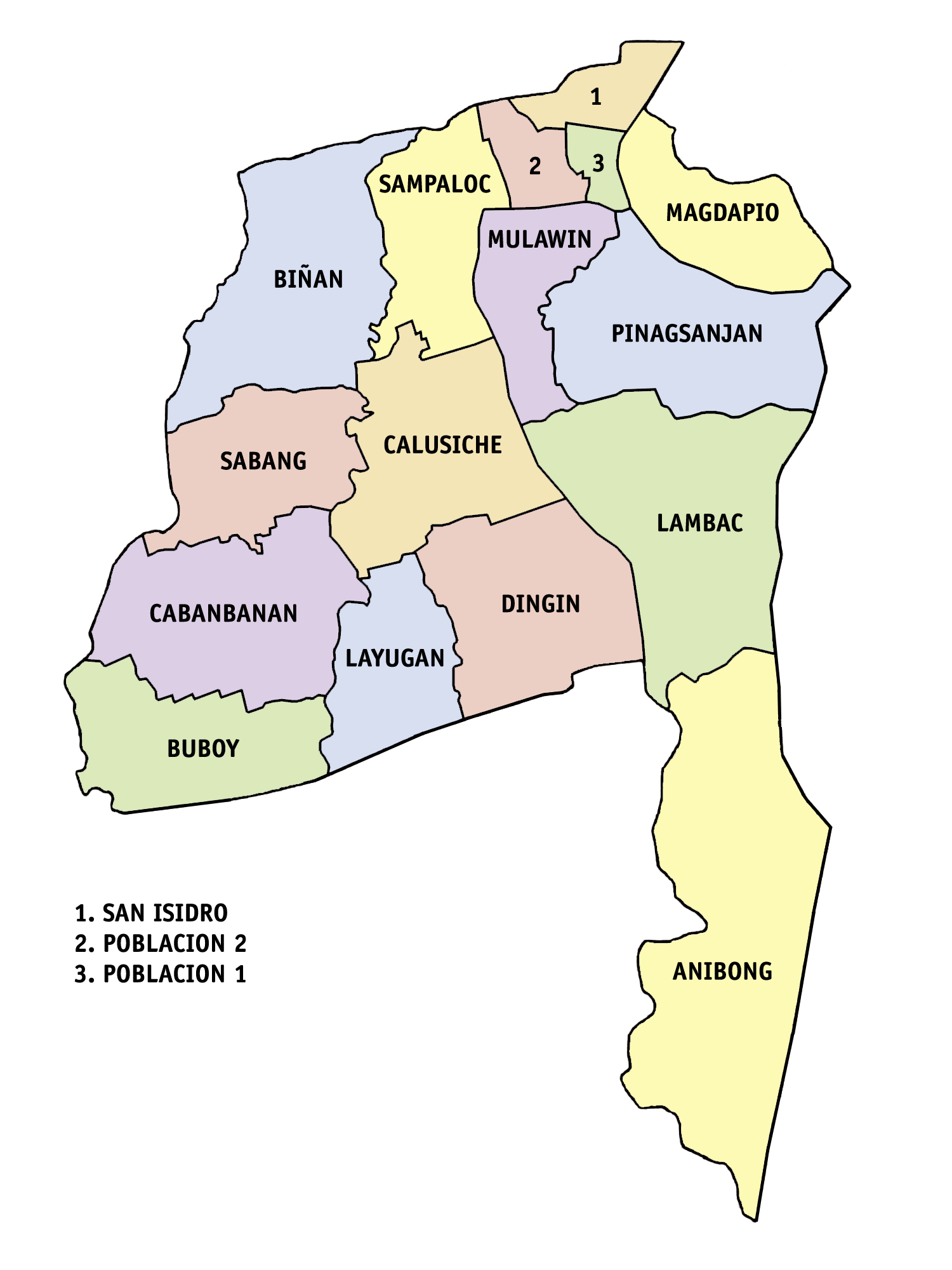
Political map of Pagsanjan

- Anibong
- Biñan
- Buboy
- Cabanbanan
- Calusiche
- Dingin
- Lambac
- Layugan
- Magdapio
- Maulawin
- Pinagsanjan
- Barangay I (Poblacion)
- Barangay II (Poblacion)
- Sabang
- Sampaloc
- San Isidro

=== Climate ===
Climate data for Pagsanjan, Laguna
Month	Jan	Feb	Mar	Apr	May	Jun	Jul	Aug	Sep	Oct	Nov	Dec	Year
Mean daily maximum °C (°F)	26 (79)	27 (81)	29 (84)	31 (88)	31 (88)	30 (86)	29 (84)	29 (84)	29 (84)	29 (84)	28 (82)	26 (79)	29 (84)
Mean daily minimum °C (°F)	22 (72)	22 (72)	22 (72)	23 (73)	24 (75)	25 (77)	24 (75)	24 (75)	24 (75)	24 (75)	24 (75)	23 (73)	23 (74)
Average precipitation mm (inches)	58 (2.3)	41 (1.6)	32 (1.3)	29 (1.1)	91 (3.6)	143 (5.6)	181 (7.1)	162 (6.4)	172 (6.8)	164 (6.5)	113 (4.4)	121 (4.8)	1,307 (51.5)
Average rainy days	13.4	9.3	9.1	9.8	19.1	22.9	26.6	24.9	25.0	21.4	16.5	16.5	214.5
Source: Meteoblue

== Demographics ==
Population census of Pagsanjan
Year	Pop.	±% p.a.
1903	6,361	—
1918	7,538	+1.14%
1939	8,865	+0.78%
1948	9,282	+0.51%
1960	10,691	+1.18%
1970	14,556	+3.13%
1975	16,188	+2.15%
1980	19,489	+3.78%
1990	25,024	+2.53%
1995	28,999	+2.80%
2000	32,622	+2.56%
2007	35,944	+1.35%
2010	39,313	+3.31%
2015	42,164	+1.34%
2020	44,327	+1.06%
2024	45,602	+0.68%
Source: Philippine Statistics Authority

In the 2024 census, the population of Pagsanjan was 45,602 people, with a density of 1,700 inhabitants per square kilometer or 4,400 inhabitants per square mile.

== Government ==
Elected municipal officials (2025–2028)
Position	Name	Party
Mayor	Januario Ferry G. Garcia	AKAY
Vice Mayor	Rod H. Fernandez	PFP
Councilors
Councilors	John Paul J. Ejercito	Independent
Councilors	Allan Q. Arroyo	Independent
Councilors	Dennis Dale V. Gonzales	PFP
Councilors	Noel L. Cabella	PFP
Councilors	Nathanael C. Bernales II	KANP
Councilors	Ronie S. Leron	PFP
Councilors	Melvin B. Madriaga	Independent
Councilors	Abner B. Leron	Bangkero

== Economy ==
Poverty incidence of Pagsanjan (%)

Source: Philippine Statistics Authority

== Culture ==
=== Pagsanjan March ===
The official song of the town is the "Pagsanjan March". The anthem was composed by Rogel Taiño, a native of Pagsanjan.

=== Bangkero Festival ===
Also known as the “Pagsanjan Bangkero Festival,” this five-day annual celebration is held every April in honor of the town’s patron saint and its skilled local boatmen, known as bangkeros. The festival features a range of activities, including colorful boat races, street dancing, float parades, trade fairs, concerts, and sporting events. A highlight of the celebration is the boat race along the Bumbungan (Balanac) River leading to the famous Pagsanjan Falls, showcasing the expertise and navigation skills of the bangkeros.

== Education ==
The Pagsanjan Schools District Office governs all educational institutions within the municipality. It oversees the management and operations of all private and public schools from the primary to secondary levels.

=== Primary and elementary schools ===
- Anibong Elementary School
- Caesar Z. Lanuza Elementary School
- Dingin Elementary School
- Dr. Augusto E. Hocson Elementary School
- Francisco Benitez Memorial School
- Good Beginnings Foundation Learning Center
- Jose A. Gallardo, Sr. Elementary School (Magdapio Elementary School)
- M. Z. Lanuza Elementary School
- Maulawin Elementary School
- Pagsanjan Academy
- Pinagsanjan Elementary School
- Sampaloc Elementary School
- San Isidro Elementary School
- Unson Elementary School

=== Secondary school ===
- Liceo de Pagsanjan
- Pagsanjan National High School
- Stand Alone Senior High School No. 3
- Unson National High School

=== Higher educational institutions ===
- Angelita V. Del Mundo Foundation
- AVM Foundation (Sampaloc)
- Paete Science and Business College

== Notable personalities ==
- Pedro Pelaez – educator and priest, considered the "Father of Filipinization of the Church" and "The Godfather of the Philippine Revolution"
- Gelia Tagumpay Castillo – National Scientist of the Philippines for Rural Sociology
- Patis Tesoro – National Artist of the Philippines for Fashion Design
- Gregorio F. Zaide – historian and author, "Dean of Filipino Historiographers"
- Leandro H. Fernandez – educator, author and historian
- Conrado Benitez – First Dean of the College of Liberal Arts at the University of the Philippines, educator and author, one of the drafters of the 1935 Constitution
- José Fabella – physician and public health advocate, Father of Public Health and Social Welfare in the Philippines
- Ernesto Maceda – former councilor of Manila, former senator, Senate president, columnist and lawyer
- Mario Montenegro – actor
- Louie Ignacio – TV director
- Dan Fernandez – Actor, Mayor of Santa Rosa, Laguna, Board Member, 9th Vice Governor of Laguna and Member of the House of Representatives from Laguna's 1st District
- E.R. Ejercito – Actor, 17th Governor of Laguna and Mayor of Pagsanjan
- Benjo Agarao – politician
- Jam Agarao – politician
- Maita Sanchez – Actress, Mayor and Vice Mayor of Pagsanjan
- John Amores – basketball player

== See also ==
- Pagsanjan Falls
- Pagsanjan Arch
- Our Lady of Guadalupe Parish Church (Pagsanjan)
- Pagsanjan Municipal Hall
- Bumbungan River
- Battle of Pagsanjan

Preceded by Bay	Capital of Laguna; 1688-1858	Succeeded by Santa Cruz
