= Lumot Dam =

Dam in Laguna, Philippines

Coordinates: 14°15′50″N 121°32′31″E

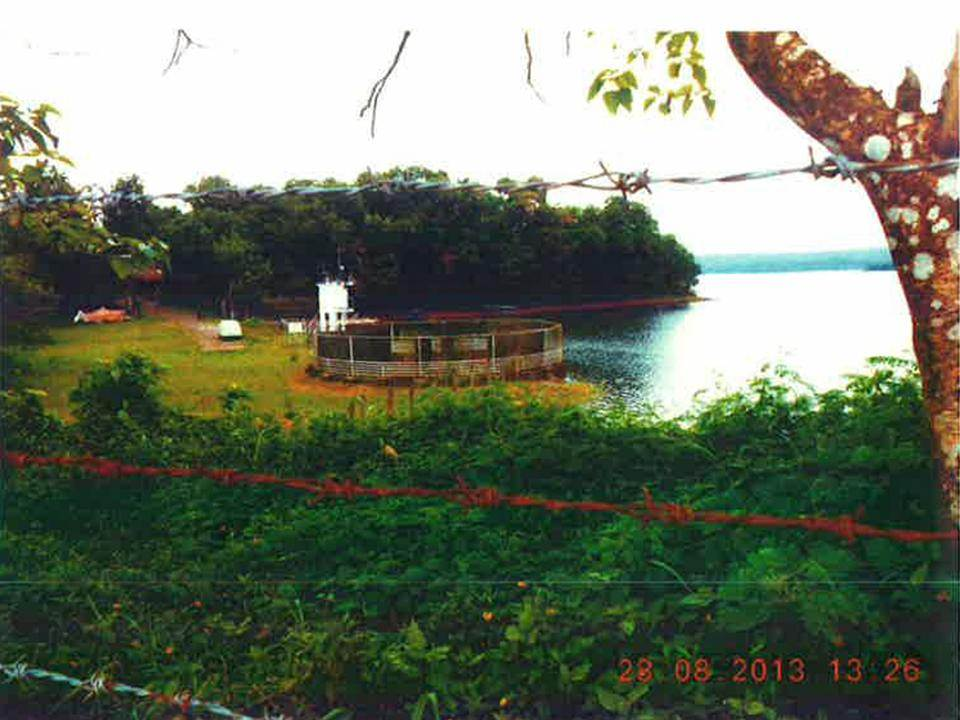
Lumot Dam in 2013

Lumot River Dam is an embankment dam located between the towns of Cavinti and Lumban, in the province of Laguna, Philippines. The dam was constructed across Lumot River creating a reservoir now known as Lumot Lake or Sierra Lake. Lumot Lake provides additional water through a Bell-mouth spillway and tunnel to Caliraya Lake, which in turn serves as the upper reservoir for the Kalayaan Pumped-Storage Hydroelectric Plant.

== History ==
Lumot Dam was started on June 1, 1948 with the passing of Republic Act no. 216 approving expenditures for the construction of several hydroelectric dams in the Philippines including the diversion of Lumot River and raising of the height of Caliraya Dam.

== See also ==
- Water supply and sanitation in the Philippines
- Energy in the Philippines
