= Caliraya Dam =

Dam in Laguna, Philippines

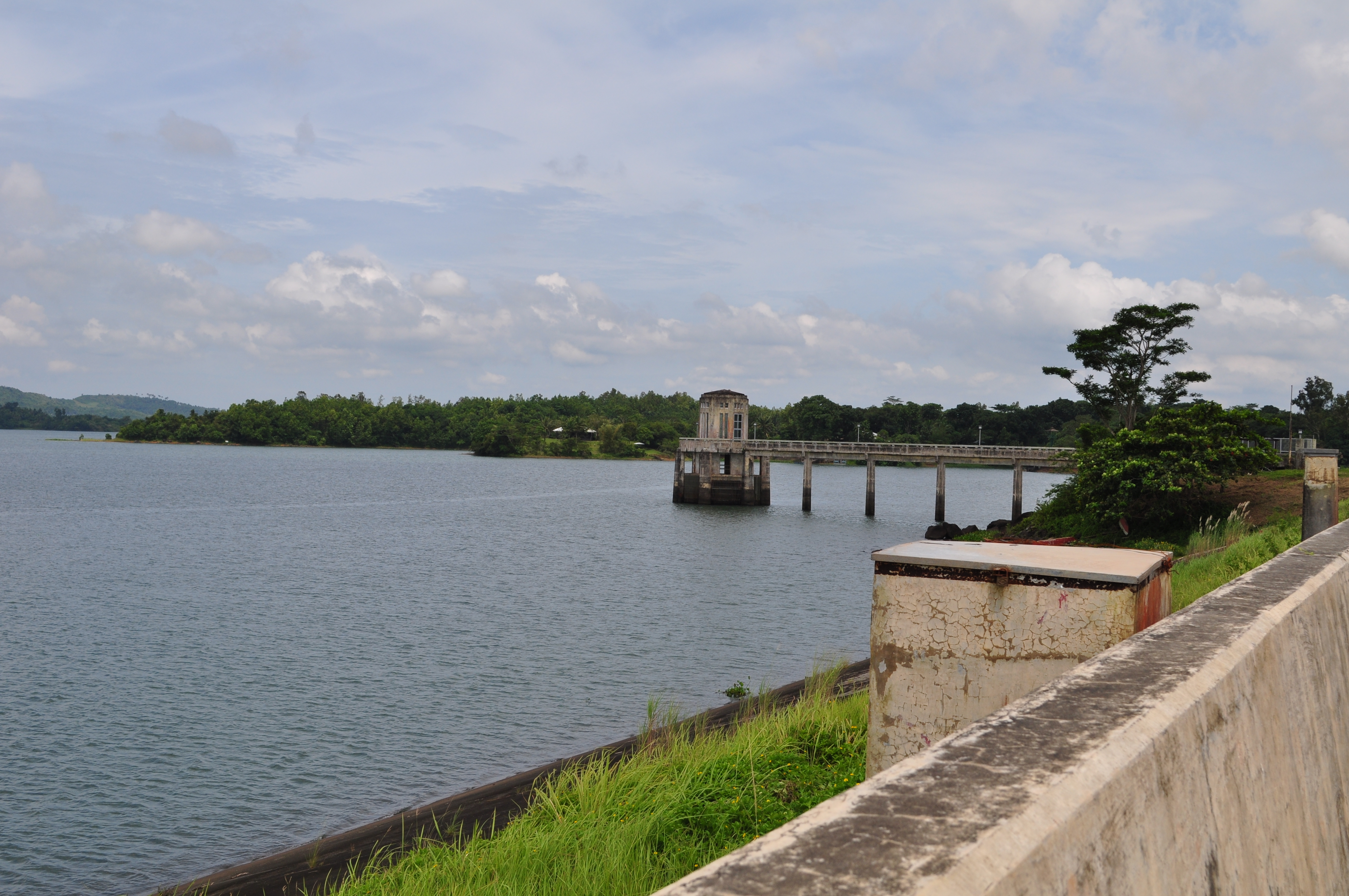
- The embankment dam

- Location in Luzon Location in the Philippines
- Official name: Kalayaan Pumped-Storage Project
- Country: Philippines
- Location: Laguna (province)
- Coordinates: 14°17′18″N 121°30′5″E
- Status: Operational
- Construction began: 1939 by the Pedro Siochi and Company

Dam and spillways
- Type of dam: Embankment dam
- Impounds: Caliraya River
- Spillways: 1
- Spillway type: Chute spillway

Reservoir
- Creates: Lake Caliraya
- Total capacity: Caliraya Dam and Lumot Dam combined 30,000,000 cubic metres (1.1×10^{9} cu ft) (between maximum and minimum level)
- Catchment area: 92,000 square metres (990,000 sq ft)

Power Station
- Operators: CBK Power Co. Ltd. Owner: National Power Corporation
- Type: Pumped-storage hydroelectricity and conventional dam
- Turbines: 2 Francis-type
- Installed capacity: 300 MW (1983); 684.6 MW (2008); Max. planned: 900 MW (Stage I); 2000 MW (Stage II)

Caliraya Dam is an embankment dam located in the town of Lumban, Laguna, in the Sierra Madre Mountain Range of the Philippines. The reservoir created by the dam, Lake Caliraya, initially supplied one of the oldest hydroelectric plants in the Philippines, and later became a popular recreational area for numerous water sports and fishing. The dam's construction was started in 1939 under the supervision of the architecture firm of Pedro Siochi and Company and a small hydroelectric plant was operated in 1942.

Lake Caliraya was later connected with another man-made lake, Lumot Lake, to provide more water through a 2.3 km (1.4 mi) underground penstock. Later still the dam and lake were used as the upper reservoir for the Kalayaan Pumped-Storage Hydroelectric plant located west of Lake Caliraya, with Laguna de Bay as the lower reservoir.

== History ==
=== Initial studies ===
In the early years of American occupation, the Bureau of Engineering of the Philippine Commission investigated possible sources for hydroelectric development in the country. Initial surveying were done in Botocan Falls, Caliraya River, Angat River and Agno River. Mr. A. H. Perkins, assistant engineer began investigations of the Caliraya project on November 11, 1903, and his report was submitted to the Philippine Commission on March 23, 1904. Further studies were needed for more accurate and extended data on minimum discharge, rainfall, and area of watershed. Mr. H. F. Labelle, an assistant engineer, performed the observations from April 22, 1904, to September 1, 1904. Extensive gaugings of the stream were made to determine the low-water flow, the watershed area was surveyed, and a rain gauge was established in Barangay San Antonio, Kalayaan a town located within the watershed. A river gauge was also established.

The constructive features of the initial study were as follows: By the construction of a dam on the river, the water would be diverted into a canal 3.75 kilometres (2.33 mi) long to the brow of the bluff, where it would fall through penstocks 240 metres (800 ft) to the powerhouse near the Lumbang River. The power would then be transmitted to Manila, a distance of 98 kilometres (61 mi). To meet the dry-season flow and conserve the flood waters, storage reservoirs would be established on the river at suitable points. This development could be carried out at comparatively small cost and would not require exceptional engineering features. The capacity of the plant could also be increased by diverting the Lumot River to the Caliraya. However, the feasibility of the development was still in question because of storage problems. The theoretical horsepower available at the first proposed power house, with a moderate storage, was estimated at only about 6,000, which could be increased for about one-half of the year during the rainy season.

=== Construction ===
In 1937, Major General Hugh John Casey was sent to the country by US Army Corps of Engineers upon request by the Philippine Commonwealth to provide assistance in hydroelectric power and flood control for the recently created National Power Corporation (NAPOCOR). The dam construction was started in 1939 from the designs planned by Hugh John Casey, upon approval by the Philippine Commonwealth President Manuel L. Quezon. An embankment dam over 100 feet (30 m) high, was constructed across the Caliraya River at its outlet from a large flat plateau area providing a large water reservoir for generating hydroelectric power for Southern Luzon from the Caliraya hydroelectric plant. A diversion canal was constructed several miles west of the lake to the head of a steep slope about 950 feet (290 m) above Laguna de Bay. Large penstocks were constructed diverting water down to the powerhouse below, with a tailrace to the lake. The high head permitted the use of high-speed turbines and generators at relatively low unit costs. Initial estimate for the project was $5 million, or 10 million pesos, and an output of 40,000 horsepower(30 megawatts).

During World War II, the dam was sabotaged by retreating combined American and Filipino soldiers to prevent its use by invading Japanese who rebuilt it, but later sabotaged it themselves as their own defeat approached.

On June 1, 1948, Republic Act No. 216 was passed approving expenditures for the construction of several hydroelectric dams in the Philippines; the act included the diversion of the Lumot River via Lumot Dam to Caliraya Lake for more available water and to raise the height of Caliraya Dam. The dam was rebuilt, raised and inaugurated in 1953 by the (NAPOCOR).

In 1972, President Ferdinand Marcos of the Philippines bestowed upon Casey the honorary title of "the father of water power development in the Philippines, for his pioneering endeavors in the country.

=== Kalayaan Pumped-Storage Hydroelectric Project ===
The pumped-storage hydroelectric project was commissioned on February 23, 1983, with an initial output of 300 MW from two turbines.

== See also ==
- Lake Caliraya
- Water supply and sanitation in the Philippines
- Energy in the Philippines
