= Duhat, Laguna =

Duhat, Laguna, may refer to:

- Duhat, a barangay in Santa Cruz, Laguna, a first class urban municipality and capital of the province of Laguna in the Philippines
- Duhat, an urban barangay in Cavinti, a third class municipality in the province of Laguna in the Philippines
