= Embroidery capital =

Embroidery capital may refer to:

- Union City, New Jersey "Embroidery Capital of the United States"
- Lumban, Laguna "Embroidery Capital of the Philippines"
- Surat "Embroidery Capital of the India"
