= Cavinti Underground River and Caves Complex =

Site in Laguna, Philippines

- Location within Laguna
- Location: Cavinti, Laguna, Philippines
- Coordinates: 14°16′51″N 121°38′6″E
- Elevation: 280 m (920 ft)
- Discovery: 2011
- Geology: Limestone karst
- Entrances: Multiple
- Access: With guides
- Show cave opened: 2013
- Features: Speleogen

The Cavinti Underground River and Caves Complex (CURCC) is a cave system in the eastern part of Laguna, Philippines. It lies within barangay Paowin in the municipality of Cavinti. This area is part of the southern Sierra Madre range, a rugged karst landscape in which there are a number of limestone caves. The CURCC includes subterranean rivers and other water flow, leading to active speleogen growth.

The caves are about 2 kilometers (1.2 mi) from the nearest village, and are surrounded by forest. This landscape supports a variety of species, including some that are locally and globally endangered. Some arthropod species have been described from specimens collected from the site. In 2013, the cave system opened as a tourist attraction operated by the Cavinti government. Tourism and its associated development, including the construction of a paved road to the site, has affected both the caves and their surrounding environment.

== Location ==
The CURCC (14°16'51"N, 121°38'6"E) is located within barangay Paowin in the municipality of Cavinti, around 15 minutes drive from the municipal center. This eastern part of the province of Laguna contains part of the Sierra Madre mountain range. It has a dry season from March to May and a wet season for the other months. The southern Sierra Madre is a distinct ecological area that remains underresearched, and consists of rugged terrain which contains a number of limestone cave systems.

The CURCC is surrounded by natural forest and lies around 2 kilometers (1.2 mi) from the nearest settlement. This karst forest is mostly secondary growth, dominated by Melastomataceae, Euphorbiaceae, and Ficus species. Surrounding this forest is agricultural land for crops such as coconuts. However, there are some spots of old-growth forest. The main river flowing through the site is the Lalangawan River.

== History and tourism ==
The cave system was discovered by a local logger either in 1980 or 2011. The Department of Environment and Natural Resources classifies the caves as Class II, meaning portions can be used by the public if accompanied by official guides. It was opened to tourists on March 30, 2013. Tourist activities are managed by the Cavinti local government, with visitors required to register at the local tourism office.

Three caves are open to tourists: the Cathedral, Minalokan, and Kalaw caves. The entrance to Cathedral cave (14°16'54"N, 121°38'10"E) lies 280 meters (920 ft) above sea level, while the entrance to Minalokan cave (14°16'54"N, 121°37'58"E) lies 295 meters (968 ft) above sea level. Both are large caves with multiple entrances. Each has an underground river flowing through it. Minalokan cave can be accessed through what are referred to as its first and second floors. The first floor has a river flowing through it, while the second has a smaller stream. A third floor is also accessible from within the cave. The water in the caves forms rivers, pools, and waterfalls. Entering the caves can require wading through this water. The cave floors are covered in guano.

The active water flow in the caves means that speleothems actively form from the surrounding limestone. The resulting formations are a tourist draw. One formation is called the "fountain of youth", and produces safe drinking water.

As the site is both managed and relatively remote, human disturbance is limited. However, a paved road constructed from the main barangay village that stops 250 meters (820 ft) from Cathedral cave directly impacted the environment, while also resulting in more nearby construction and an increase in tourists. There is also visible damage in Minalokan cave, including stalactite mining and graffiti.

== Biodiversity ==
A study published in 2023 found the site had a terrestrial vertebrate Shannon's Diversity Index of 1.771. Endangered terrestrial vertebrates present include Amboina box turtle and Crab-eating macaque, while vulnerable species include Gray's monitor, the Philippine eagle-owl, the rufous hornbill, and the white-winged flying fox. Further, some species are considered locally endangered or threatened. The aforementioned Philippine eagle-owl, rufous hornbill, and Gray's monitor are considered locally endangered. The indigo-banded kingfisher, Philippine hanging parrot, and amethyst brown dove are locally critically endangered. The white-browed shama, Luzon hornbill, and white-winged flying fox are locally threatened. Amphibians present include the common tree frog. Introduced species include the tanezumi rat. Grey-rumped swiftlets reside within the caves.

There are species from at least four bat families in the caves and surrounding forest. These species include the lesser short-nosed fruit bat, Philippine dawn bat, cave nectar bat, Fischer's pygmy fruit bat, diadem leaf-nosed bat, large Asian roundleaf bat, Philippine pygmy roundleaf bat, Philippine long-fingered bat, Horsfield's bat, greater musky fruit bat, arcuate horseshoe bat, Philippine forest horseshoe bat, large rufous horseshoe bat, and Geoffroy's rousette. The insectivorous species host a larger number of antibiotic-resistant bacteria than the others, possibly reflecting greater interaction with agricultural environments. Insectivorous bats also show high levels of infection by parasitic worms, including those from the Acanthatrium, Nycteridostrongylus, Prosthodendrium, Plagiorchis, Toxocara, and Vampirolepis genera. Species that live in the caves also have a higher rate of infection. Bacterial parasites of frugivore bats include Mycoplasmoidaceae, Helicobacteriaceae, and Neisseriaceae species.

There are 41 species of fungus identified, a majority being saprotrophic. Common species include Daldinia concentrica, Rigidoporus microporus, Auricularia auricula, Lentinus tigrinus, Schizophyllum commune, and Microporus xanthopus. The 41 species come from 34 genera and 20 families.

The stick insect Stenobrimus pilipinus was described from the site's forest. This species may be part of a species complex with other Stenobrimus species, with all known Stenobrimus species being endemic to the Philippines.

The Diplura species Parajapyx rarosorum was described in 2023 from a holotype found in Minalokan cave. This was the fourth dipluran species identified in the Philippines, and the second Parajapyx species. The mites Eremobelba okinawa, Allogalumna dilatata, Galumna vladopesici, Mirogalumna leytensis, Pergalumna bimaculata, Pergalumna panayensis, and Lupaeus dentatus have been found in the plant litter surrounding the caves.
