= Lumot Lake =

Man-made reservoir in Laguna province, Philippines

- Sierra Lake
- Location within the Philippines
- Location: Luzon Island
- Coordinates: 14°15′2.16″N 121°33′2.88″E

Lumot Lake, also known as Sierra Lake, is a man-made water reservoir located in the towns of Cavinti and Lumban of Laguna province, in the Sierra Madre Mountains of the Philippines. The lake was created when Lumot Dam, an embankment dam, was constructed damming the Lumot River, creating an auxiliary water reservoir for Lake Caliraya as part of the Kalayaan Pumped-Storage Hydroelectric Plant. The waters between the two lakes are conveyed by a 2.3 kilometres (1.4 mi) penstock.

Lumot Lake is less developed than the bigger Lake Caliraya but both lakes are popular spots for water sports and largemouth bass fishing.
