= Lumban =

Municipality in Laguna, Philippines

- Municipality
- Municipality of Lumban
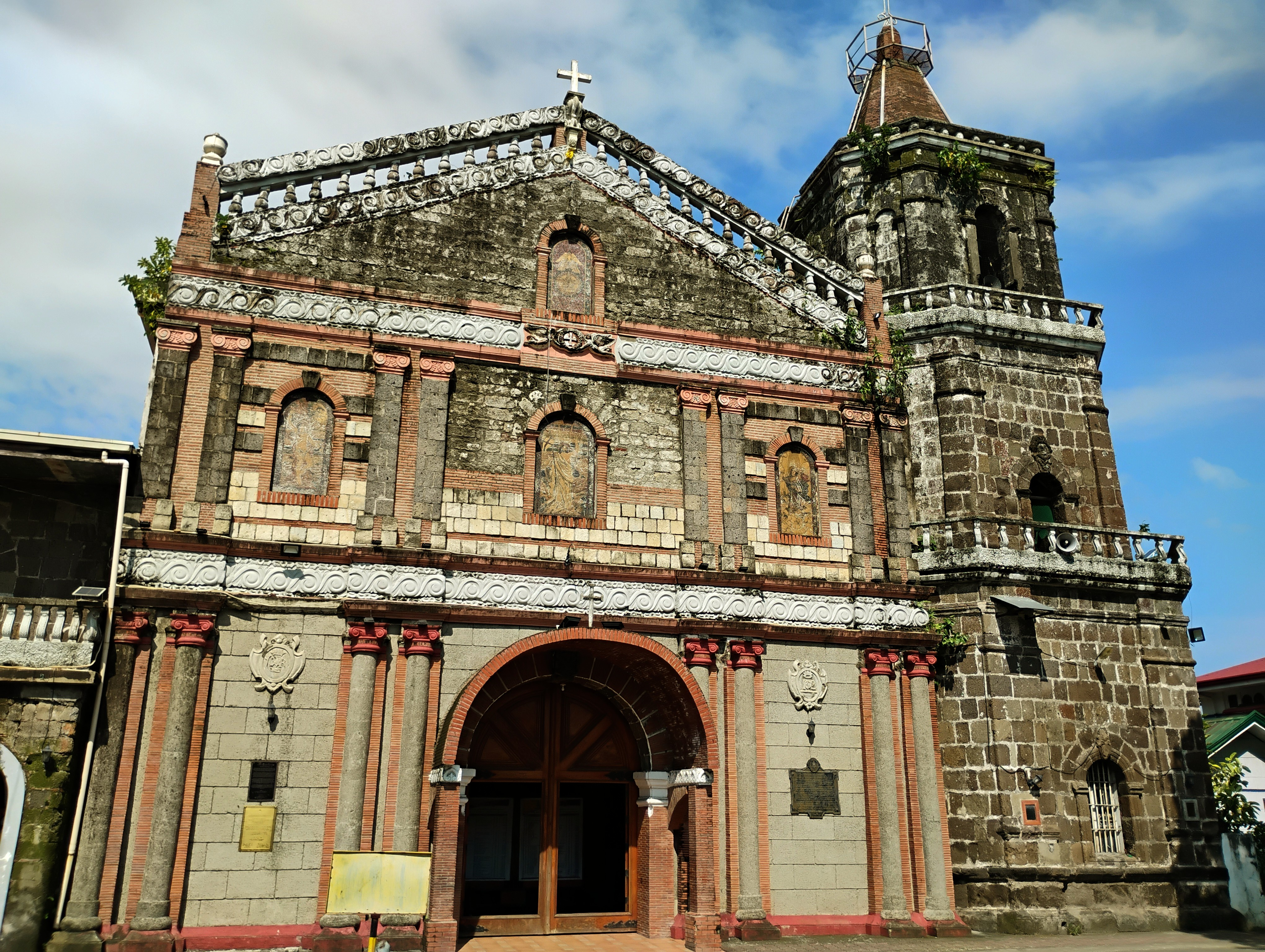
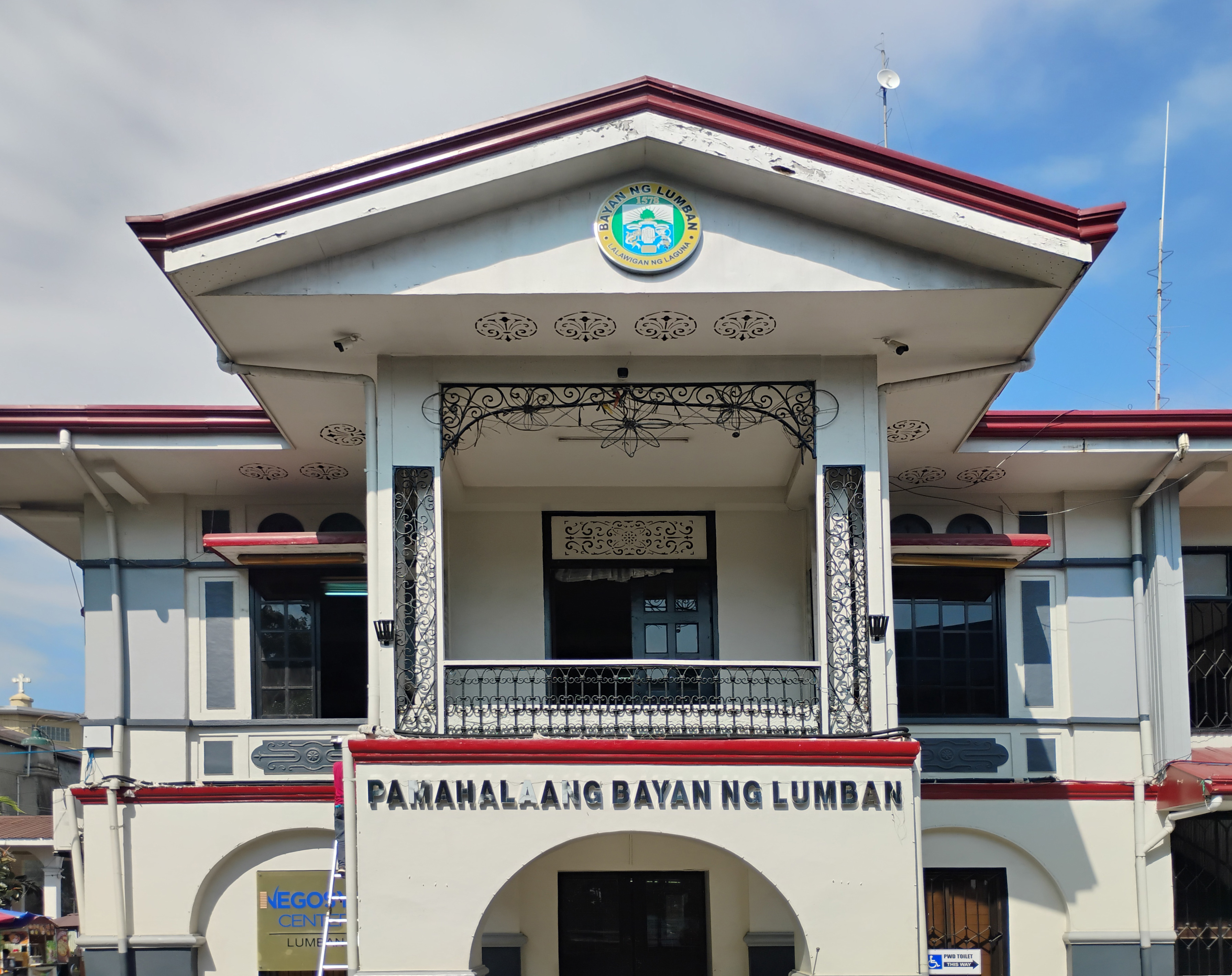
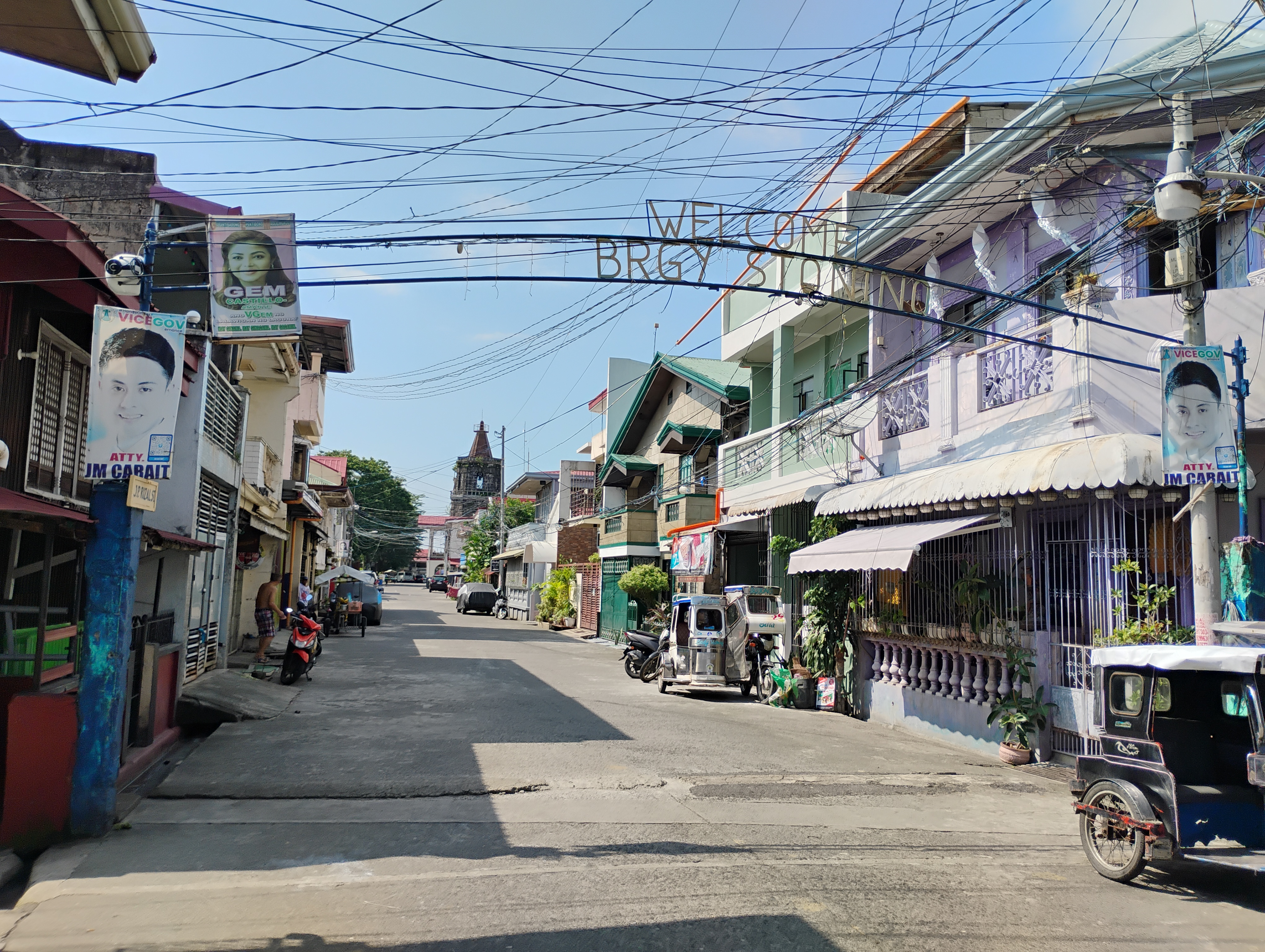
- Saint Sebastian the Martyr Parish Church of Lumban Lumban Municipal Hall Lumban Town Proper

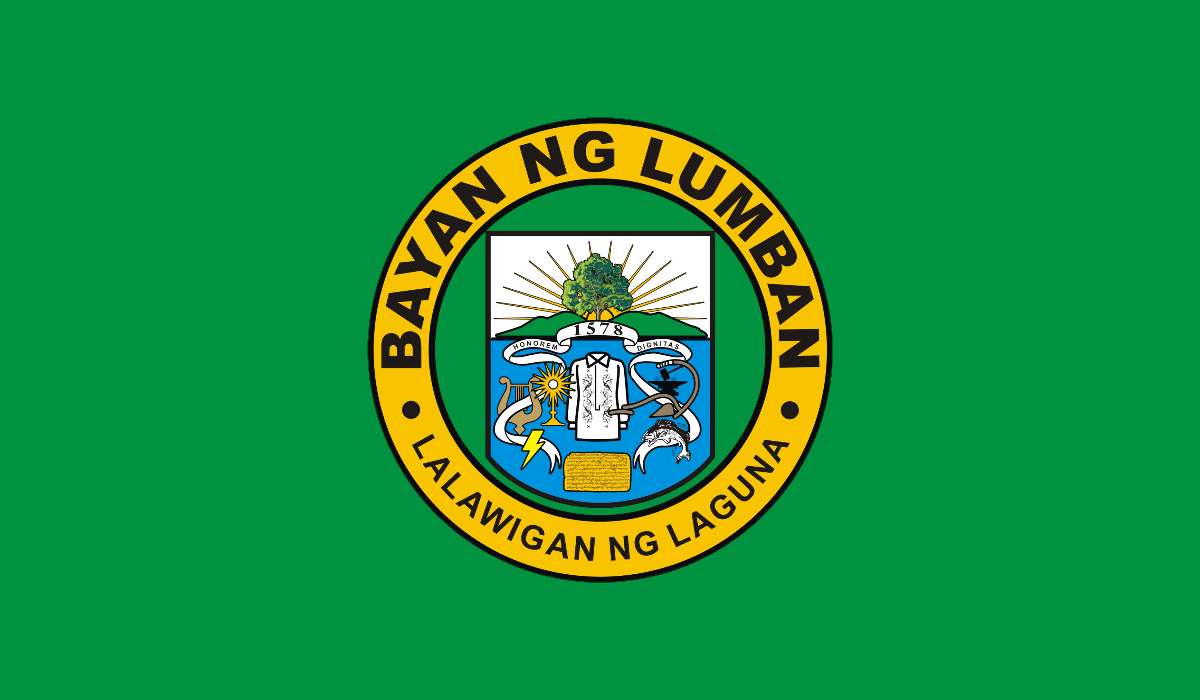
- Flag Seal
- Nickname: Embroidery Capital of the Philippines
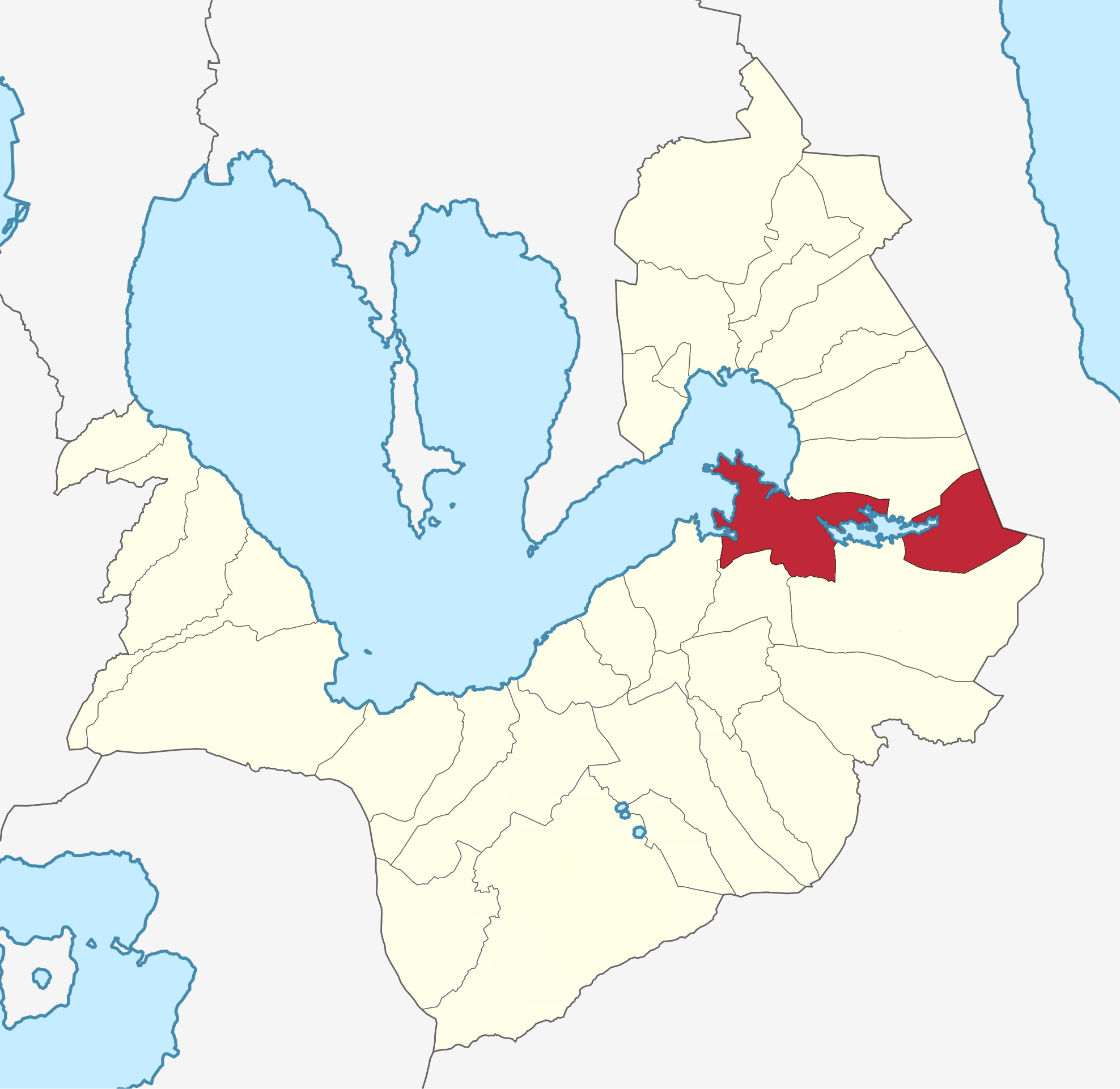
- Map of Laguna with Lumban highlighted
- Interactive map of Lumban
- Location within the Philippines
- Coordinates: 14°17′49″N 121°27′32″E
- Country: Philippines
- Region: Calabarzon
- Province: Laguna
- District: 4th district
- Founded: September 22, 1578
- Barangays: 16 (see Barangays)

Government
  - Type: Sangguniang Bayan
  - Mayor: Belen B. Raga
  - Vice Mayor: Ireneo R. Baldovino
  - Representative: Benjamin Agarao Jr.
  - Municipal Council: Members: Modesto B. Abadier; Mark Anthony L. Lagrosa; Geronimo P. Samonte Jr.; Rodolfo F. Castillo Jr.; Benson A. Del Valle; Cristine Rosales P. Landayan; Reden R. Rivera; Katelyn Ubatay Ferrer
  - Electorate: 23,274 voters (2025)

Area
  - Total: 40.53 km^{2} (15.65 sq mi)
- Highest elevation: 724 m (2,375 ft)
- Lowest elevation: 0 m (0 ft)

Population (2024 census)
  - Total: 32,793
  - Density: 809.1/km^{2} (2,096/sq mi)
  - Households: 8,535

Economy
  - Income class: 3rd municipal income class
  - Poverty incidence: 9.38% (2023)
  - Revenue: ₱ 176.8 million (2024)
  - Assets: ₱ 281.7 million (2024)
  - Expenditure: ₱ 74.55 million (2024)
  - Liabilities: ₱ 145.2 million (2024)

Service provider
  - Electricity: First Laguna Electric Cooperative (FLECO)
- Time zone: UTC+8 (PST)
- ZIP code: 4014
- PSGC: 0403413000
- IDD : area code: +63 (0)49
- Native languages: Tagalog

Lumban, officially the Municipality of Lumban (Tagalog: Bayan ng Lumban), is a municipality in Laguna, Philippines. According to the 2024 census, it has a population of 32,793 people.

The town is home to Lake Caliraya, an artificial lake popular with nature lovers and sports enthusiasts. It is known as the "embroidery capital of the Philippines," where fine jusi and piña cloth are hand-embroidered, with the finished product used for the barong tagalog worn by men and the saya (skirt) worn by women in a baro't saya outfit. Lumban is also known for its diverse range of footwear, like sandals, slippers, and step-in designs made from local materials.

== Etymology ==
It derives its name from Aleurites moluccanus, a tree locally known as 'Lumbang'.

== History ==
=== Spanish colonial period ===
Lumban was founded on September 22, 1578, by Fray Juan de Plasencia and Fray Diego de Oropesa, who planted a holy cross in the area. The first church, dedicated to San Francisco and made of bamboo and nipa, was burned in 1586. With the collaboration of Governor Don Santiago de Vera and a local Tagalog chief named Burlon, construction began on a new stone church and was completed in 1600. Lumban was formally organized as a town on September 22, 1590.

The Church of Lumban is claimed to be the first Franciscan building in the Philippines outside Manila.

During the early Spanish period, Lumban was a large town that included the modern-day towns Santa Cruz, Cavinti, and Pagsanjan. Santa Cruz was separated from Lumban in 1602, followed by Cavinti in 1619, and Pagsanjan in 1668.

== Geography ==
Lumban, one of the oldest towns in Laguna lies approximately 7 kilometres (4.3 mi) from Santa Cruz, 94 kilometres (58 mi) southeast of Manila and 55 kilometres (34 mi) north of Lucena.

=== Barangays ===
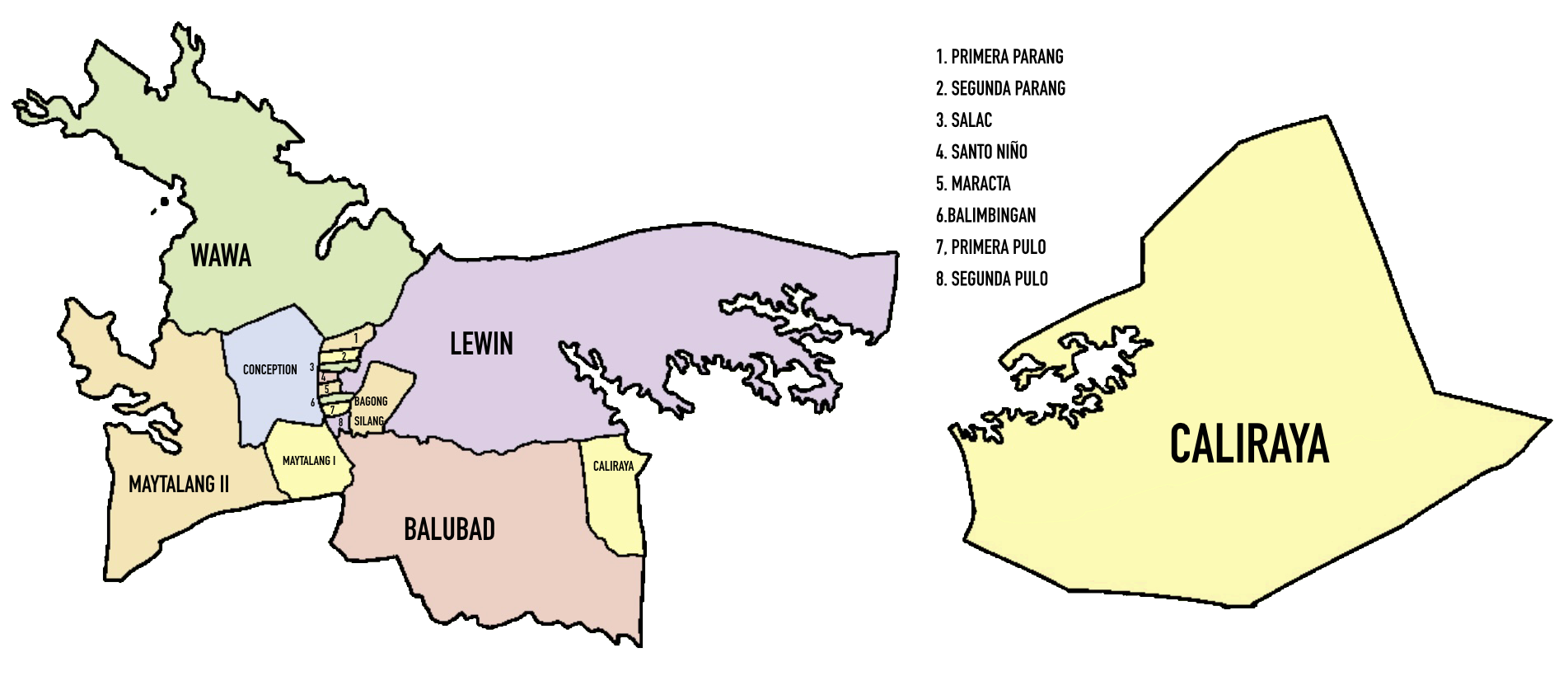
Barangay map of Lumban

Lumban is politically subdivided into 16 barangays, as indicated below. Each barangay consists of puroks, and some have sitios.

- Bagong Silang
- Balimbingan (Poblacion)
- Balubad
- Caliraya
- Concepcion
- Lewin
- Maracta (Poblacion)
- Maytalang I
- Maytalang II
- Primera Parang (Poblacion)
- Primera Pulo (Poblacion)
- Salac (Poblacion)
- Santo Niño (Poblacion)
- Segunda Parang (Poblacion)
- Segunda Pulo (Poblacion)
- Wawa

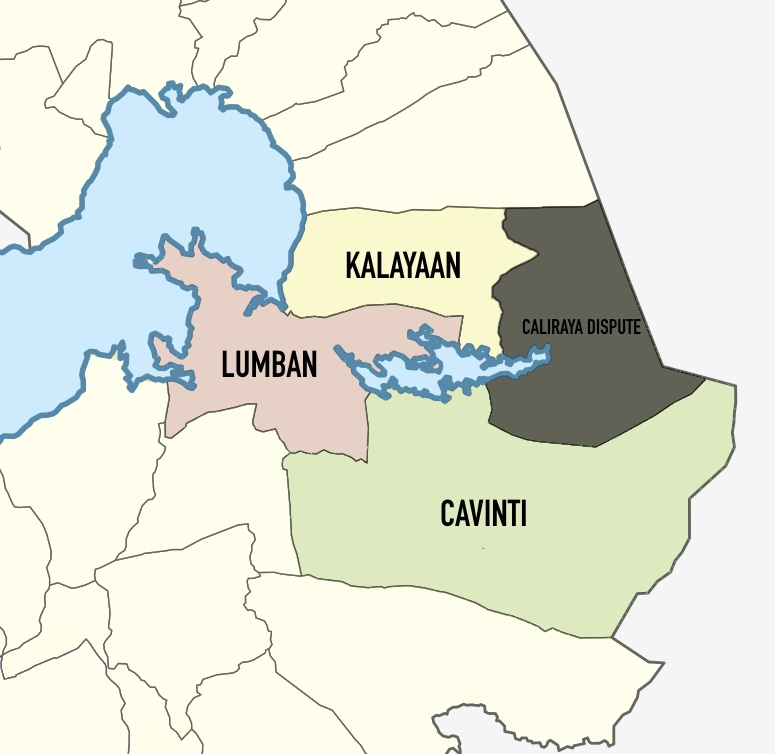
A territorial dispute of Cavinti, Lumban, and Kalayaan on the map of Laguna

A dispute exists regarding the Caliraya Watershed on the eastern half of Barangay Caliraya between the municipalities of Kalayaan and Cavinti. The dispute relates to land and water include illegal settlements, land tenure rights, hydropower generation, recreation and tourism, and aquaculture production, among others.

=== Lake Caliraya ===
Lumban is home to Lake Caliraya, a man-made lake created in 1939 that has become a popular spot for water sports and outdoor recreation, including fishing. The surrounding area features numerous tourist-friendly resorts and vacation homes, which are common due to the local scenery and climate.

=== Caliraya Dam ===
Caliraya Dam is an embankment dam in Lumban, located in the Sierra Madre range. The reservoir created by the dam, Lake Caliraya, initially supplied one of the oldest hydroelectric plants in the Philippines and later became a recreational area for water sports and fishing. Work on the dam began in 1939, and a small hydroelectric plant was operational by 1942.

Lake Caliraya was later connected to Lumot Lake, another man-made lake, via a 2.3 km (1.4 mi) underground penstock to increase water supply. Subsequently, the dam and lake were used as the upper reservoir for the Kalayaan Pumped-Storage Hydroelectric plant located west of Lake Caliraya, with Laguna de Bay as the lower reservoir.

=== Climate ===
Climate data for Lumban, Laguna
Month	Jan	Feb	Mar	Apr	May	Jun	Jul	Aug	Sep	Oct	Nov	Dec	Year
Mean daily maximum °C (°F)	26 (79)	27 (81)	29 (84)	31 (88)	31 (88)	30 (86)	29 (84)	29 (84)	29 (84)	29 (84)	28 (82)	26 (79)	29 (84)
Mean daily minimum °C (°F)	22 (72)	22 (72)	22 (72)	23 (73)	24 (75)	25 (77)	24 (75)	24 (75)	24 (75)	24 (75)	24 (75)	23 (73)	23 (74)
Average precipitation mm (inches)	58 (2.3)	41 (1.6)	32 (1.3)	29 (1.1)	91 (3.6)	143 (5.6)	181 (7.1)	162 (6.4)	172 (6.8)	164 (6.5)	113 (4.4)	121 (4.8)	1,307 (51.5)
Average rainy days	13.4	9.3	9.1	9.8	19.1	22.9	26.6	24.9	25.0	21.4	16.5	16.5	214.5
Source: Meteoblue

== Demographics ==
Population census of Lumban
Year	Pop.	±% p.a.
1903	3,905	—
1918	4,288	+0.63%
1939	5,954	+1.58%
1948	7,516	+2.62%
1960	9,719	+2.16%
1970	13,289	+3.17%
1975	14,842	+2.24%
1980	17,360	+3.18%
1990	19,773	+1.31%
1995	21,996	+2.02%
2000	25,936	+3.60%
2007	28,443	+1.28%
2010	29,470	+1.30%
2015	30,652	+0.75%
2020	32,330	+1.13%
2024	32,793	+0.34%
Source: Philippine Statistics Authority

According to the 2024 census, the population of Lumban was 32,793 people, with a density of 810 inhabitants per square kilometre or 2,100 inhabitants per square mile.

== Government ==
Elected municipal officials (2025–2028)
Position	Name	Party
Mayor	Belen B. Raga	PFP
Vice mayor	Ireneo R. Baldovino	PFP
Councilors	Modesto B. Abadier	PFP
Councilors	Mark Anthony L. Lagrosa	NUP
Councilors	Jingle Samonte	PFP
Councilors	JC Bubog Castillo	Lakas
Councilors	Benson A. Del Valle	Lakas
Councilors	Cristine Rosales P. Landayan	Lakas
Councilors	Reden R. Rivera	PFP
Councilors	Katelyn Ubatay Ferrer	PFP

== Economy ==
Poverty incidence of Lumban (%)

Source: Philippine Statistics Authority

== Culture ==
The town fiesta is held every January 20 in honor of San Sebastian, the town's patron saint. The Lupi festival is held every last Sunday of January.

=== Feast of San Sebastian ===
The San Sebastian Festival features a procession on the Lumban River, where the icon of the patron saint San Sebastian, along with hundreds of devotees, is placed on a fleet of large boats.

The San Sebastian Festival originated after the people adopted Saint Sebastian the Martyr as their patron saint in the 18th century. This annual celebration, observed every fourth Sunday of January, includes religious and cultural activities alongside the town fiesta.

The Moro-Moro, a type of “Komedya,” is performed the evening before the festival, showcasing local talents with colorful costumes.

The “Paligong Poon” takes place at the Lumban River, with the icon of San Sebastian and hundreds of devotees on the boats while holding lit candles and performing rituals across the river, known as “Lupi.”

Civic and religious organizations, as well as local bands, participate in the event. The icon is paraded around the town while locals take turns dousing the saint and devotees with water. Spectators include people from the municipality and neighboring towns.

During the feast, each barangay of Lumban features its icon of the patron saint on a float, accompanied by the nine-day novena of the Hermanas of the town.

Townspeople participate in a water-throwing ritual symbolizing purification and blessings by the ritual ceremony of the patron saint of Lumban.

=== Burdang Lumban Festival ===
The Burdang Lumban Festival is an annual cultural event held in Lumban during the third week of September. It celebrates the town’s traditional craft of hand embroidery, which has long been associated with Lumban’s identity and economy. One of the main highlights of the festival is a street dancing competition featuring schoolchildren dressed in colorful costumes inspired by the barong Tagalog and embellished with intricate embroidery motifs.

== Education ==
The Lumban-Kalayaan Schools District Office governs all educational institutions within the municipality. It oversees the management and operations of all private and public, from primary to secondary schools.

=== Primary and elementary schools ===
- Balubad Elementary School
- Caliraya Elementary School
- Concepcion Elementary School (G. Tabia Elementary School)
- Lewin Elementary School
- Lumban Central Elementary School
- Maytalang I Elementary School
- Maytalang II Elementary School
- Santo Niño Elementary School
- St. Lucy Filipini Montessori School
- Wawa Elementary School
- Lumban Academy - Nitanny School, Inc.

=== Secondary schools ===
- Little Shepherd Integrated Montessori
- Lumban National High School
- Lumban Senior High School
- Pathlight Integrated School

== Gallery ==
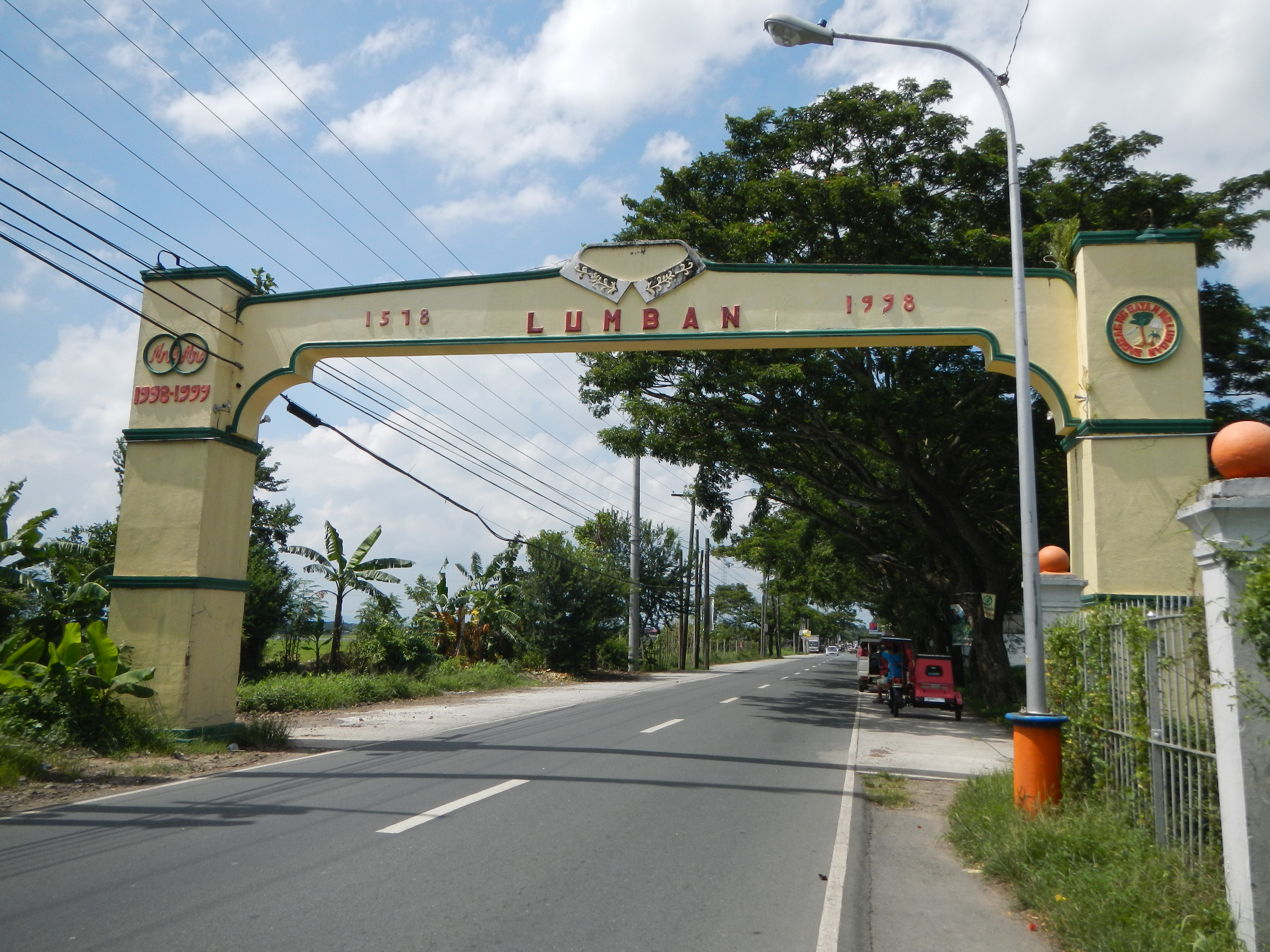
Welcome arch

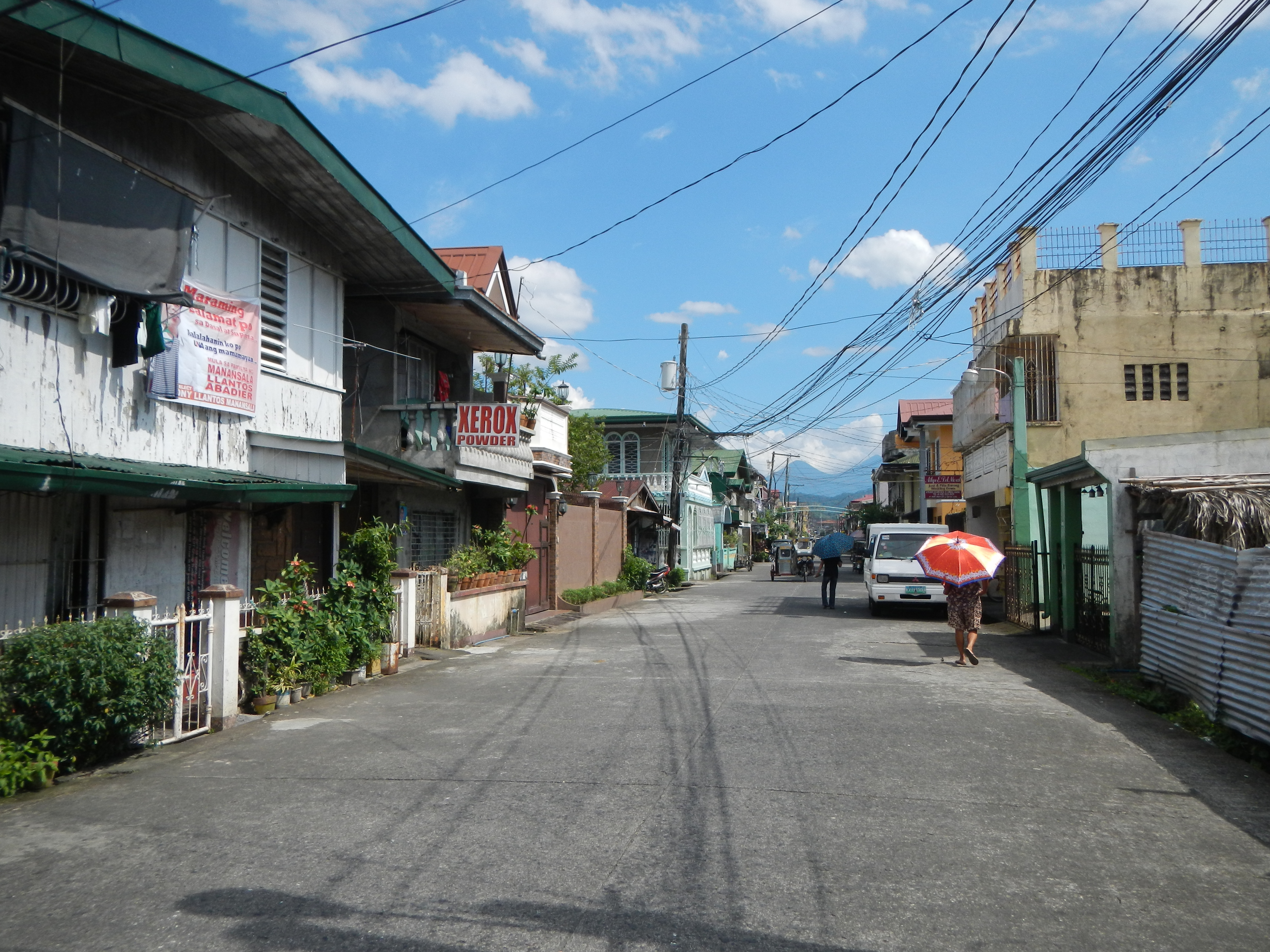
Poblacion

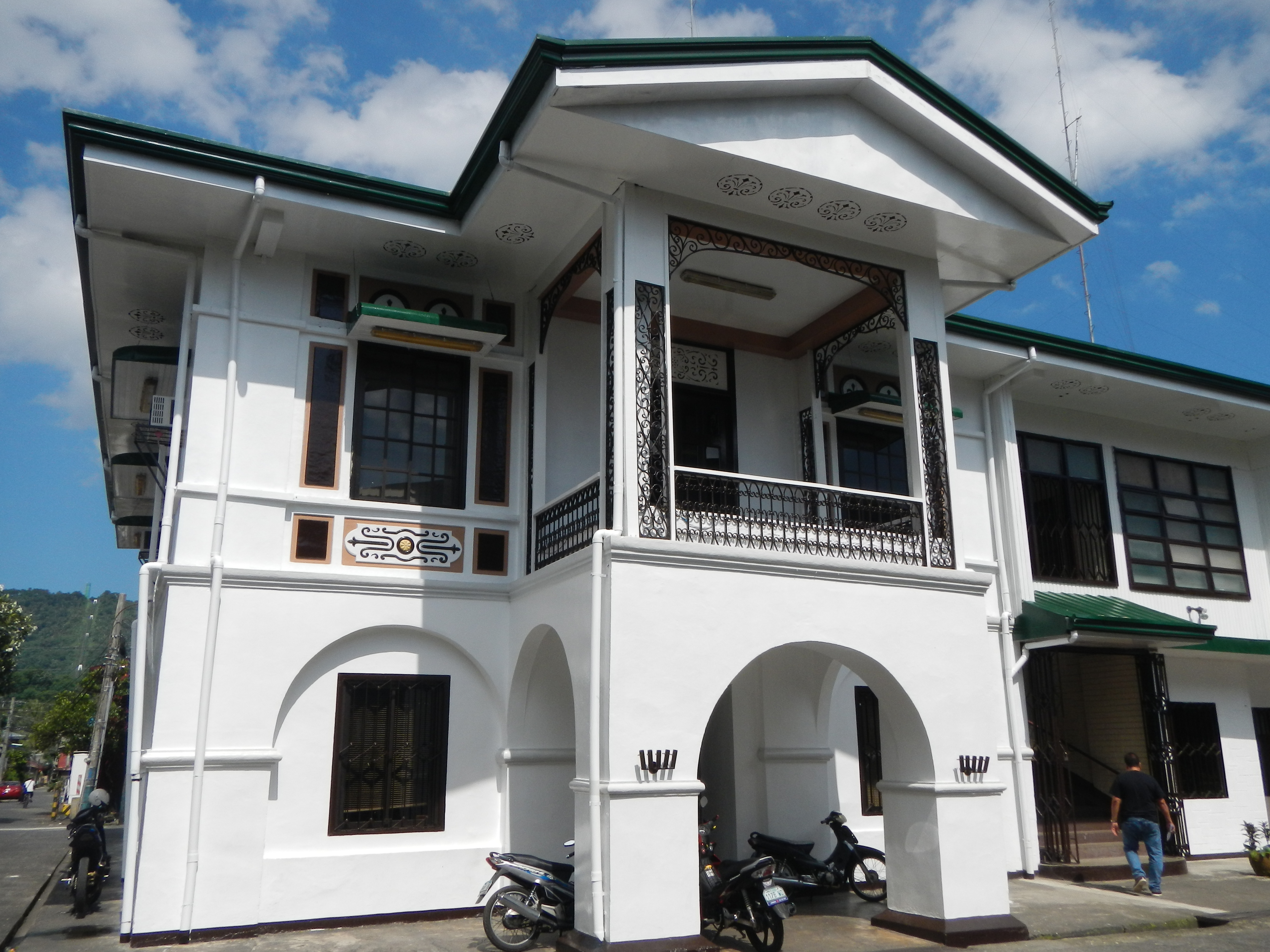
Lumban Town Hall

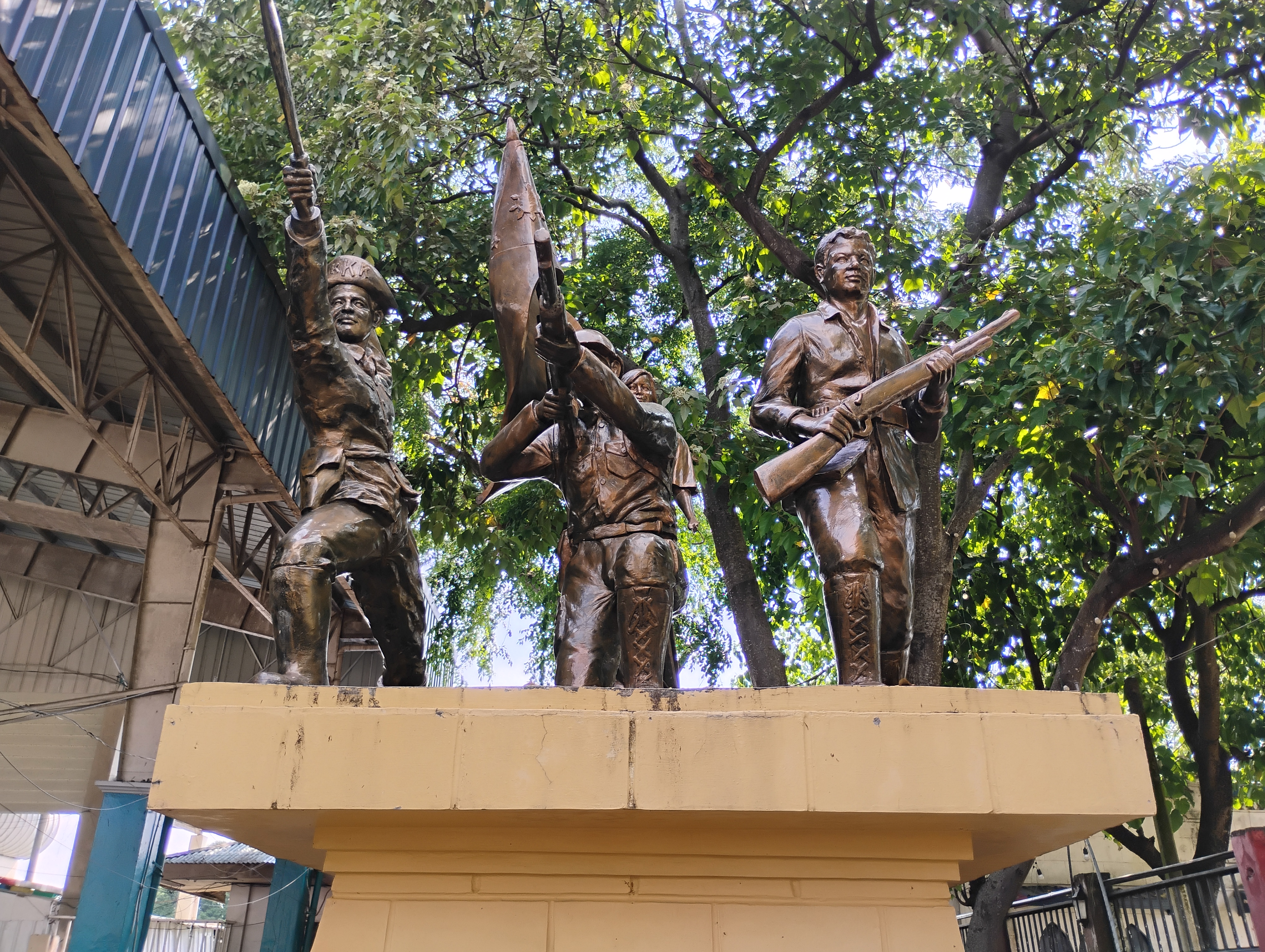
Alay sa mga Bayaning Lumbeño Monument

== Notable ==
- Benjamin Agarao Jr., Member of the Philippine House of Representatives from Laguna's 4th District
