= Cavinti =

Municipality in Laguna, Philippines

- Municipality
- Municipality of Cavinti
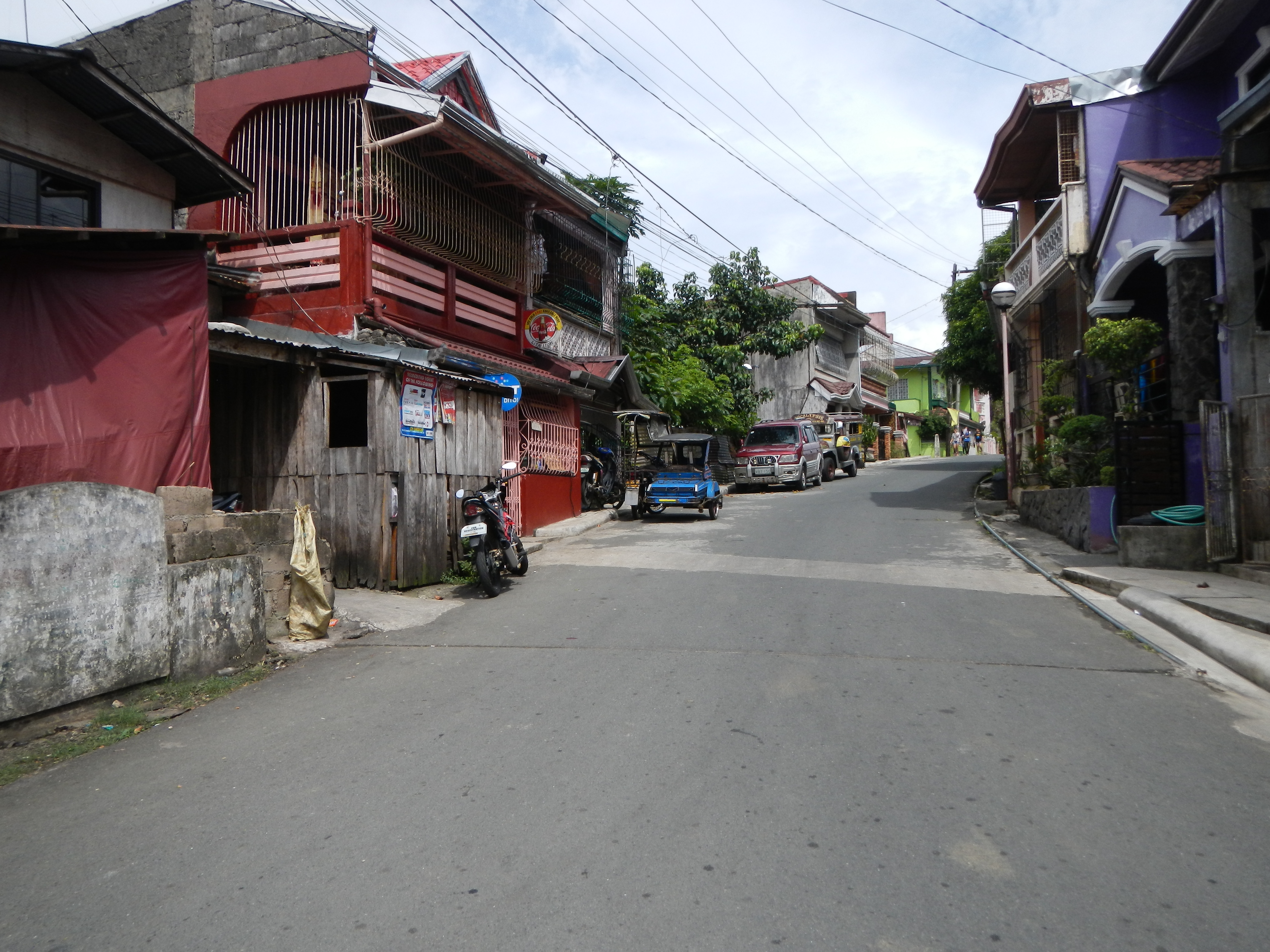
- Downtown area

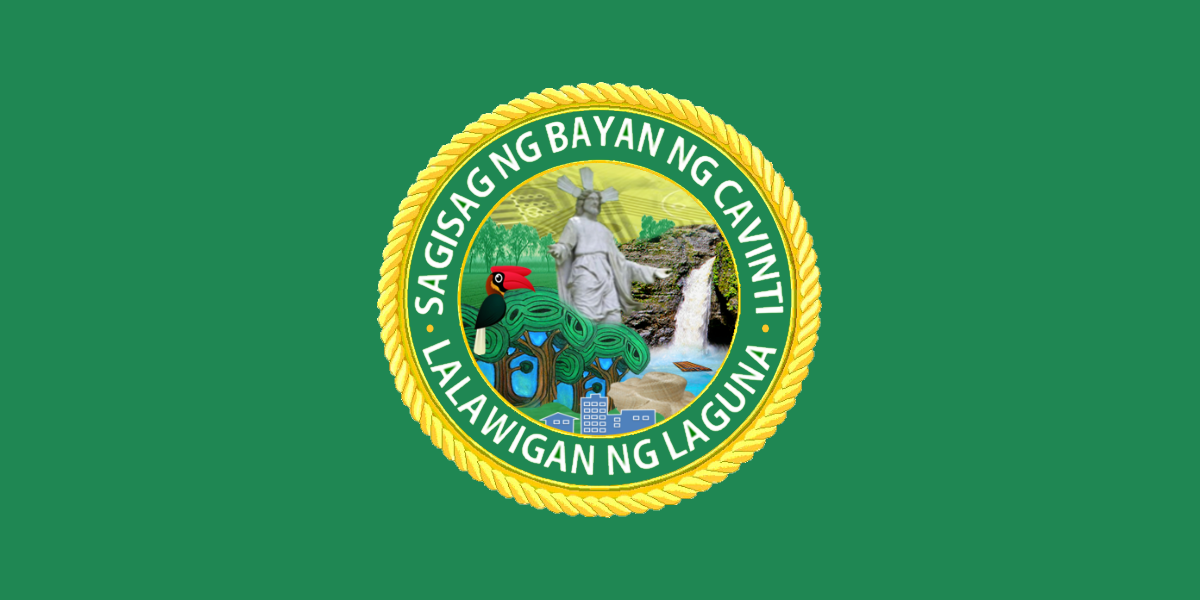
- Flag Seal
- Nicknames: The Ecotourism, Adventure, Falls and Glamping Capital of the Philippines
- Map of Laguna with Cavinti highlighted
- Interactive map of Cavinti
- Location within the Philippines
- Coordinates: 14°14′42″N 121°30′25″E
- Country: Philippines
- Region: Calabarzon
- Province: Laguna
- District: 4th district
- Founded: 1619
- Annexation to Luisiana: October 12, 1903
- Reestablished: September 12, 1907
- Barangays: 19 (see Barangays)

Government
  - Type: Sangguniang Bayan
  - Mayor: Arrantlee R. Arroyo
  - Vice Mayor: Milbert D. Oliveros
  - Representative: Benjamin C. Agarao Jr.
  - Municipal Council: Members: Jose Mari L. Esguerra; Joseph P. Baltazar; Jovenil T. Gordula; Habshan Dave D. Blastique; Godfrey L. Lubuguin; Glenn Haze M. Cabuhat; Melandro B. Lope; Romel J. Villanueva
  - Electorate: 21,190 voters (2025)

Area
  - Total: 203.58 km^{2} (78.60 sq mi)
- Elevation: 251 m (823 ft)
- Highest elevation: 436 m (1,430 ft)
- Lowest elevation: 7 m (23 ft)

Population (2024 census)
  - Total: 24,740
  - Density: 121.5/km^{2} (314.7/sq mi)
  - Households: 6,300

Economy
  - Income class: 2nd municipal income class
  - Poverty incidence: 10.95% (2023)
  - Revenue: ₱ 186.6 million (2024)
  - Assets: ₱ 956 million (2024)
  - Expenditure: ₱ 83.36 million (2024)
  - Liabilities: ₱ 52.36 million (2024)

Service provider
  - Electricity: First Laguna Electric Cooperative (FLECO)
- Time zone: UTC+8 (PST)
- ZIP code: 4013
- PSGC: 0403407000
- IDD : area code: +63 (0)49
- Native languages: Tagalog
- Website: www.cavinti.gov.ph

Cavinti, officially the Municipality of Cavinti (Tagalog: Bayan ng Cavinti), is a municipality located in the Sierra Madre mountain range in the province of Laguna, Philippines. According to the 2024 census, it has a population of 24,740 people.

It is also known as the ecotourism, adventure, and glamping capital of the Philippines. Major produce are its pandan products, including straw hat locally known as sambalilo.

== History ==
Cavinti was originally a part of Lumban, Laguna. In 1619, the town gained independent status as a parish by virtue of a papal bull believed to have come directly from Rome. In fact, this was why, again according to the legends, the two Puhawan brothers of Lumban, in search of food in early 1600, reached Cavinti where they found an image which turned out to be that of El Salvador. They brought the image to their home in Lumban. But it got lost only to be found again the very same place where it was first discovered.

The church's early structures were made of light materials. For many times they had to rebuild it on account of destruction wrought by natural calamities such as earthquakes, typhoons, and fires.

The ecclesiastical supervision of the church also belonged to Lumban since its founding. Even at the time of the construction of the first stone church in 1621.

=== Spanish period ===
During this era, Cavinti was one of the lesser villages of Lumban. The population was very low and no significant development was recorded since during that time development was focused on Lumban. Cavinti served then as a hunting ground.

=== American period ===
In 1903, Cavinti was reduced as part of Luisiana by virtue of Act No. 939. It later separated from Luisiana to be reconstituted as an independent municipality by virtue of Act No. 1712 in 1907.

Cavinti became one of the municipalities with high insurgency due to the construction of hydropower dam where several lands were submerged. In the 1930s, Teodoro Asedillo and his group operated in Cavinti, holding meetings in schools to explain the aims of the Katipunan ng mga Anak-Pawis sa Pilipinas and recruit fighters to his cause. He garnered major support in Cavinti and nearby towns, who would shelter him, provide him with funds and other resources. Asedillo was killed on December 31, 1935 following a manhunt and intense surveillance against him and his supporters. His body was crucified and paraded around town to discourage supporters.

Two connected man-made lakes, Lumot Lake and Lake Caliraya were built by American engineers in 1943 to supply water to the Caliraya Hydroelectric Plant. The two lakes are some of the places in the whole country where Filipino anglers can attempt to catch the famed Largemouth bass, a top freshwater gamefish seeded to the lake by Americans. During this regime, no further economic and infrastructure projects were implemented in Cavinti.

=== Japanese occupation ===
During the Japanese regime, insurgency became rampant, and no further economic and infrastructure development was implemented in Cavinti.

=== The Third Republic ===
Hukbalahap activity continued in the region after the war. In the 1960s, ground was broken on the Lake Caliraya shoreline for the building of the resort communities, which began a period of economic revival.

== Geography ==
Cavinti is situated on the eastern side of the province of Laguna. The town is bounded by the municipality of Lumban in the north, by the municipalities of Sampaloc, Quezon and Mauban, Quezon in the east, Pagsanjan in the west, and by Luisiana in the south. It has 19 barangays.

Cavinti is 12 kilometres (7.5 mi) from Santa Cruz, 99 kilometres (62 mi) from Manila, and 44 kilometres (27 mi) from Lucena.

=== Climate ===
Like most areas in Laguna, the climate of Cavinti is characterized by two distinct seasons: a dry season from March to May and a wet season during the remainder of the year.

Climate data for Cavinti, Laguna
Month	Jan	Feb	Mar	Apr	May	Jun	Jul	Aug	Sep	Oct	Nov	Dec	Year
Mean daily maximum °C (°F)	25 (77)	26 (79)	27 (81)	30 (86)	30 (86)	29 (84)	28 (82)	28 (82)	28 (82)	27 (81)	26 (79)	25 (77)	27 (81)
Mean daily minimum °C (°F)	21 (70)	21 (70)	21 (70)	22 (72)	23 (73)	23 (73)	23 (73)	23 (73)	23 (73)	22 (72)	22 (72)	22 (72)	22 (72)
Average precipitation mm (inches)	58 (2.3)	41 (1.6)	32 (1.3)	29 (1.1)	91 (3.6)	143 (5.6)	181 (7.1)	162 (6.4)	172 (6.8)	164 (6.5)	113 (4.4)	121 (4.8)	1,307 (51.5)
Average rainy days	13.4	9.3	9.1	9.8	19.1	22.9	26.6	24.9	25.0	21.4	16.5	16.5	214.5
Source: Meteoblue (modeled/calculated data, not measured locally)

=== Barangays ===
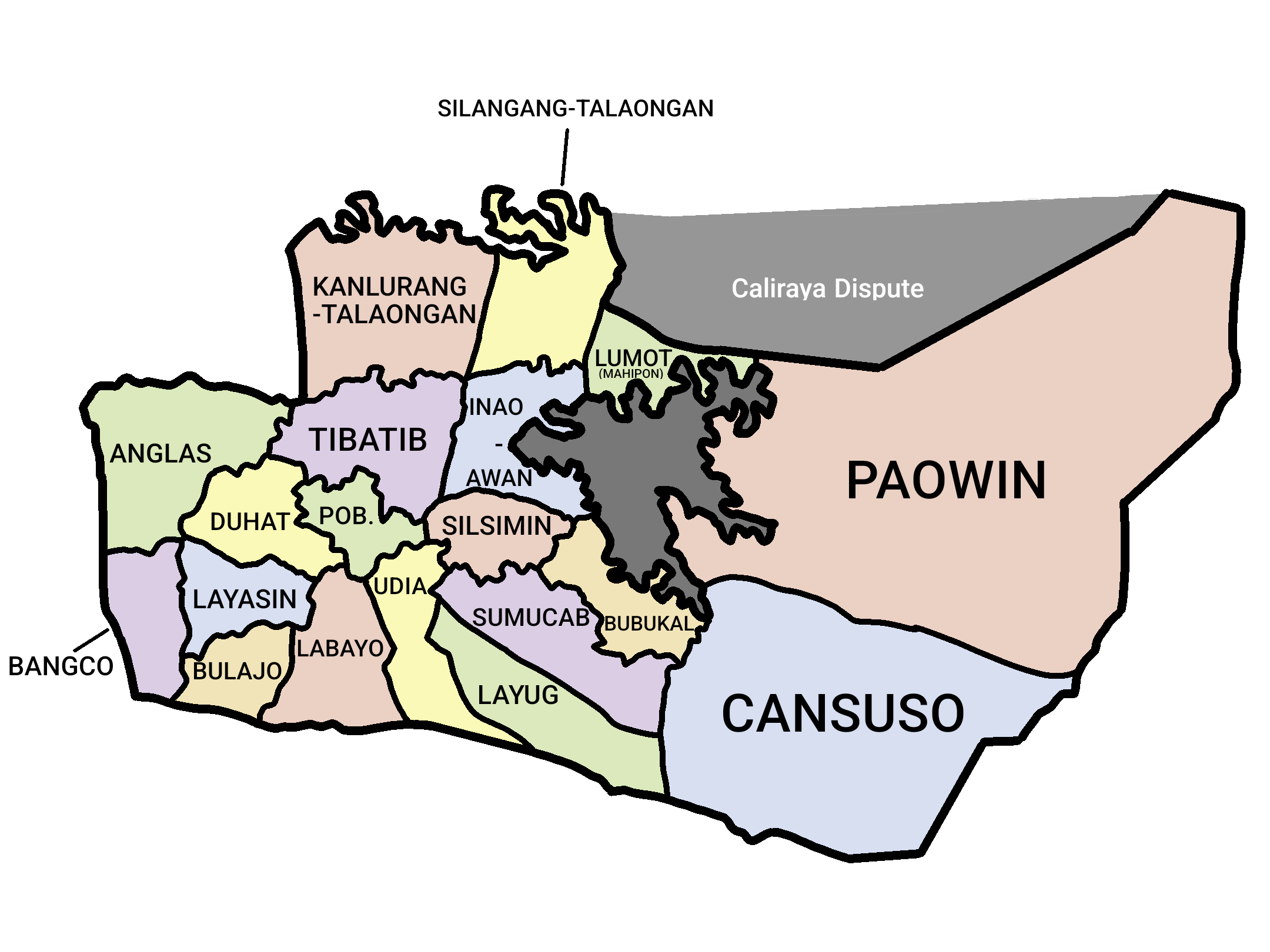
A map of Cavinti showing its barangay

Cavinti is politically subdivided into 19 barangays, as indicated below. Each barangay consists of puroks, and some have sitios.

Currently, there are two barangays which are classified as urban (highlighted in bold).

- Anglas
- Bangco
- Bukal
- Bulajo
- Cansuso
- **Duhat**
- Inao-Awan
- Kanluran Talaongan
- Labayo
- Layasin
- Layug
- Lumot/Mahipon
- Paowin
- **Poblacion**
- Sisilmin
- Silangan Talaongan
- Sumucab
- Tibatib
- Udia

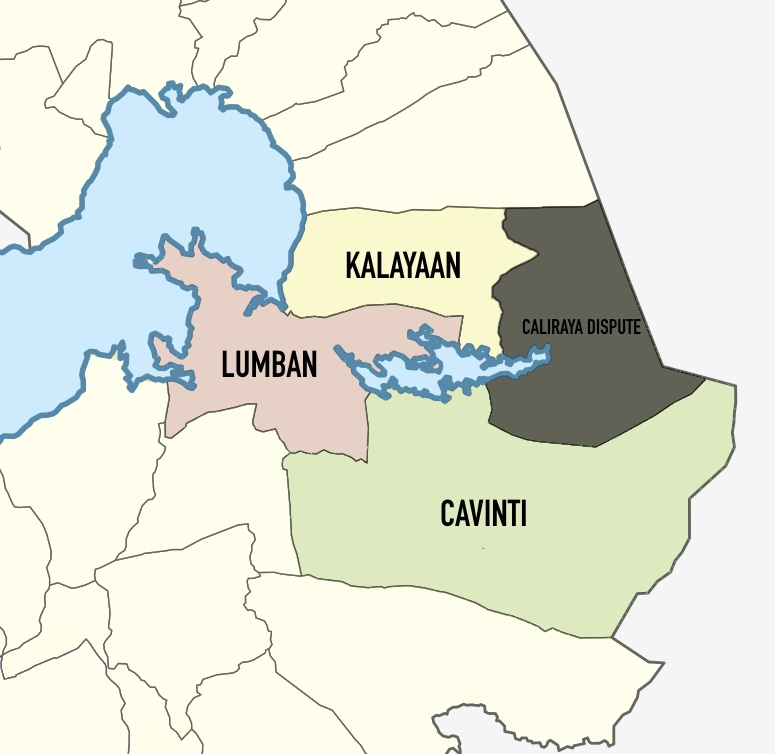
A territorial dispute of Cavinti, Lumban, and Kalayaan on the map of Laguna

The rehabilitation of 25 hectares of denuded upland forest along the eastern (Brgy. Caliraya) and northern (Brgy. Paowin) shores of the Caliraya Watershed in Cavinti was signed in a memorandum of agreement (MOA) between the country's Climate Change Commission (CCC) and the National Power Corporation (Napocor).

==== Poblacion ====
Poblacion is the center of commercial and business activities in Cavinti. Almost all of the basic municipal facilities are located in Poblacion including the Municipal Hall, Town Plaza, the Public Market, and many commercial and business establishments. The Catholic Church (Transfiguration Parish) and Aglipayan Church are also located in Poblacion.

There are said to be two significant roads in Cavinti's Población: Cailles Street, where the Public Market and many commercial stores and business establishments are located; and Magsaysay Drive, where many commercial establishments are likewise found.

== Demographics ==
Population census of Cavinti
Year	Pop.	±% p.a.
1903	4,027	—
1918	5,334	+1.89%
1939	7,254	+1.47%
1948	6,193	−1.74%
1960	8,297	+2.47%
1970	10,462	+2.34%
1975	11,463	+1.85%
1980	13,222	+2.90%
1990	15,131	+1.36%
1995	16,157	+1.24%
2000	19,494	+4.11%
2007	20,469	+0.68%
2010	20,809	+0.60%
2015	21,702	+0.80%
2020	23,980	+2.12%
2024	24,740	+0.75%
Source: Philippine Statistics Authority

In the 2024 census, the population of Cavinti was 24,740 people, with a density of 120 inhabitants per square kilometre or 310 inhabitants per square mile.

People from Cavinti are being called by nearby towns as "Kabintiin".

=== Language ===
The predominant language spoken in Cavinti is Tagalog. The media of instruction in schools are English and Tagalog languages.

== Economy ==
Poverty incidence of Cavinti (%)

Source: Philippine Statistics Authority

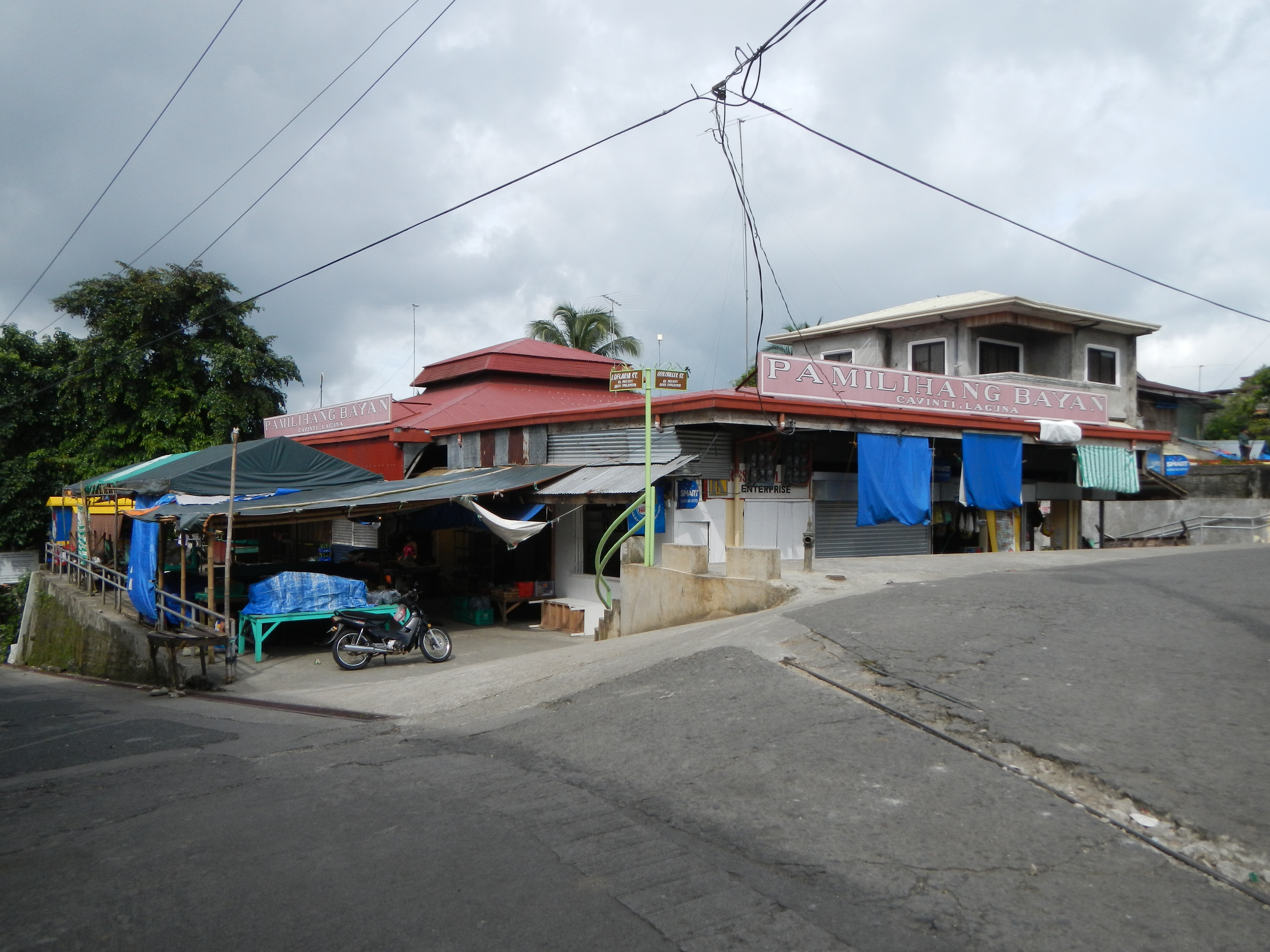
Public market

Cavinti is primarily an agricultural town. At the población, there are only a few commercial establishments which cater to the basic services of the people.

Sources of income of the people of Cavinti are mainly focused on tourism and agriculture such as palay, bamboo, pandan, copra, coconut, vegetables and fruit trees. Piggery and poultry farming are also sources of additional income for the townfolks. The business income of the local government primarily comes from CBK Power Plants, Resorts, Hotels and Restaurants and operation of several tourism-related projects.

Annual budget:

- Internal revenue allotment: Php 47,346,700.00
- Economic enterprise: Php 24,452,640.00
- National wealth share: Php 8,000,000.00
- Local revenue: Php 17,762,500.00
- Total: Php 97,561,840.00
- Income class: 3rd Class

== Tourism ==
=== Annual events and festivals ===
- Sambalilo Festival (August 1 – 6) - The Sambalilo Festival is one of the most colorful and prosperous festivals in the province of Laguna. It is celebrated to celebrate the handmade sombrero (hat) made from pandan that has been the foremost livelihood of the people since time immemorial. Highlights of the fiesta include trade fair exhibits, Cavinti's Got Talent, Brass band bonanza, street dancing, fireworks display, Cavinti Fun run, Palarong Pinoy (Traditional or cultural games), Exhibition game of PBA players vs. Cavinti All Stars and the world's biggest Sambalilo.
- Mayflower Festival (celebrated during the month of May) - It is an old annual Catholic tradition which includes offering of flowers to the image of the Virgin Mary by young girls all dressed in white called "associadas" while praying the rosary, and the holding of various Santacruzans around the town. The Hermanos and Hermanas, chosen for each year, lead the festivities as a way of sharing their blessings to them.

=== Tourist destinations ===
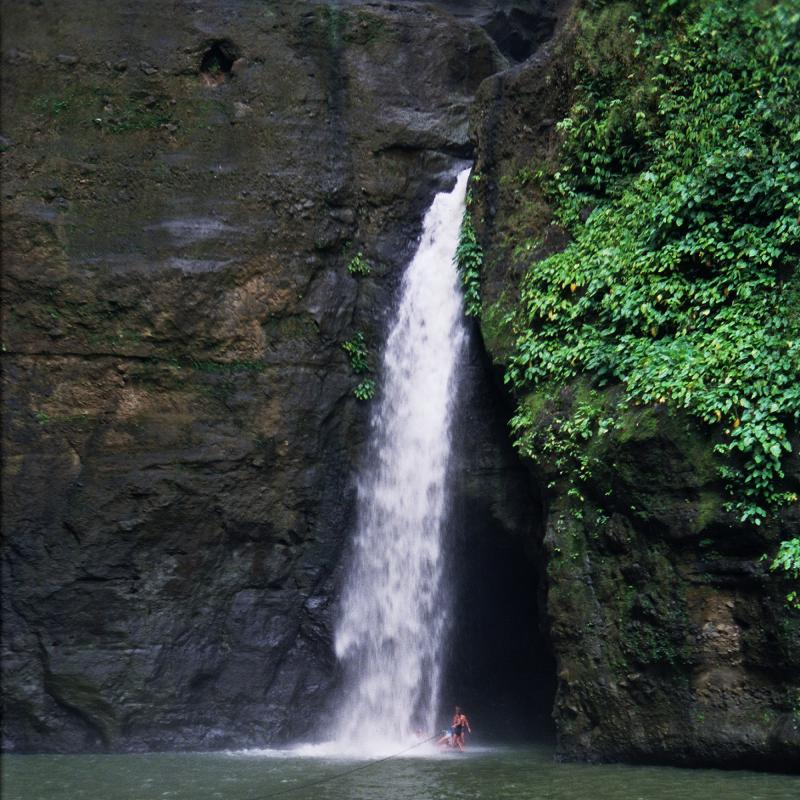
Cavinti Falls

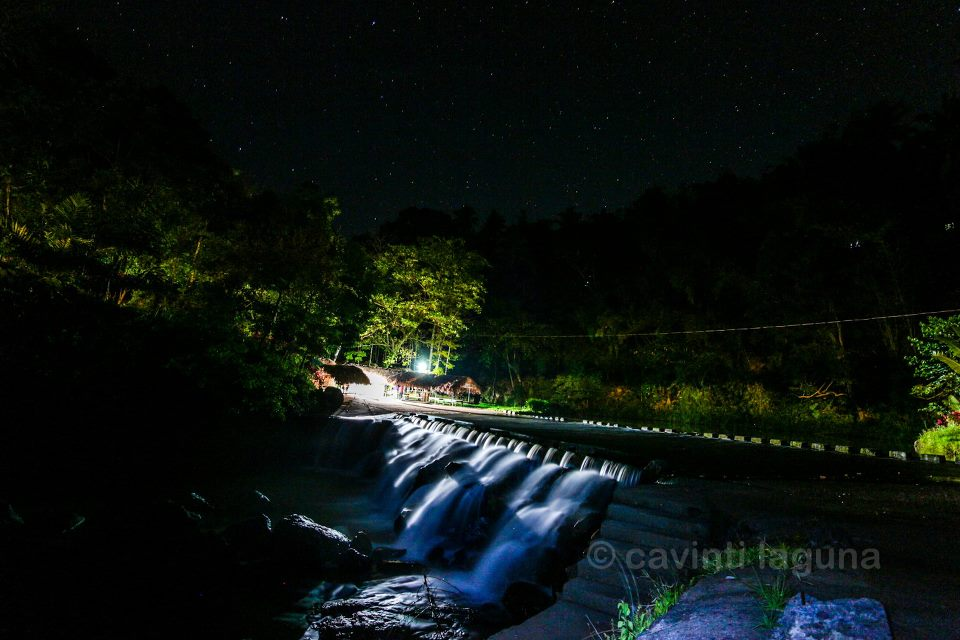
Bumbungan Eco-park at night. It is located in barangay Tibatib.

Natural features like waterfalls, rivers, lakes, caves and mountains are located in Cavinti. The Cavinti Falls, also known as Pagsanjan Falls, is actually located in Cavinti. Access to the falls is through Cavinti's own Pueblo El Salvador Cavinti Nature's Park and Picnic Groove in barangay Tibatib-Anglas. Visitors can view the nearby Mount Banahaw along the man-made lakes of Caliraya and Lumot. Sailing, wind surfing and kayaking are other activities common along the lake areas. There also other sites in Cavinti, like the Bumbungan Twin Falls, the Cavinti Underground River and Caves Complex, the Bayakan Falls and Bat Cave.

Tourist destinations:

- Cavinti Falls (a.k.a. Pagsanjan Falls) (Barangay Anglas/Tibatib)
- Cavinti Underground River and Caves Complex (Barangay Mahipon/Paowin)
- Nakulo Falls (Barangay Anglas/Tibatib)
- Caliraya Lake is a man-made lake popular for surface water sports and recreational fishing. (Barangay East and West Talaongan) and shared with the town of Lumban
- Lumot Lake is another man-made lake connected to Caliraya Lake by an underground penstock, which is also popular for water sports and sport fishing. (Barangays Mahipon, Inao-awan, Bukal, Cansuso, and Paowin)
- Bumbungan Eco Park (Barangay Tibatib)
- Pueblo El Salvador Cavinti Nature's Park and Picnic Grove (Barangay Anglas/Tibatib)
- Japanese Garden (Barangay West Talaongan)
- Bayakan Falls (Barangay Tibatib)
- Bat Cave (Barangay Tibatib)
- Bumbungan Twin Falls (Barangay Sumucab)
- Talon ng Caliraya (Barangay West and East Talaongan)
- Roman Catholic Church (Transfiguration Parish) (1606)
- Farmshare Agri Park (Barangay Duhat)
- Domelis Campsite (Barangay Silangan Talaongan)

== Government ==
=== Local government ===
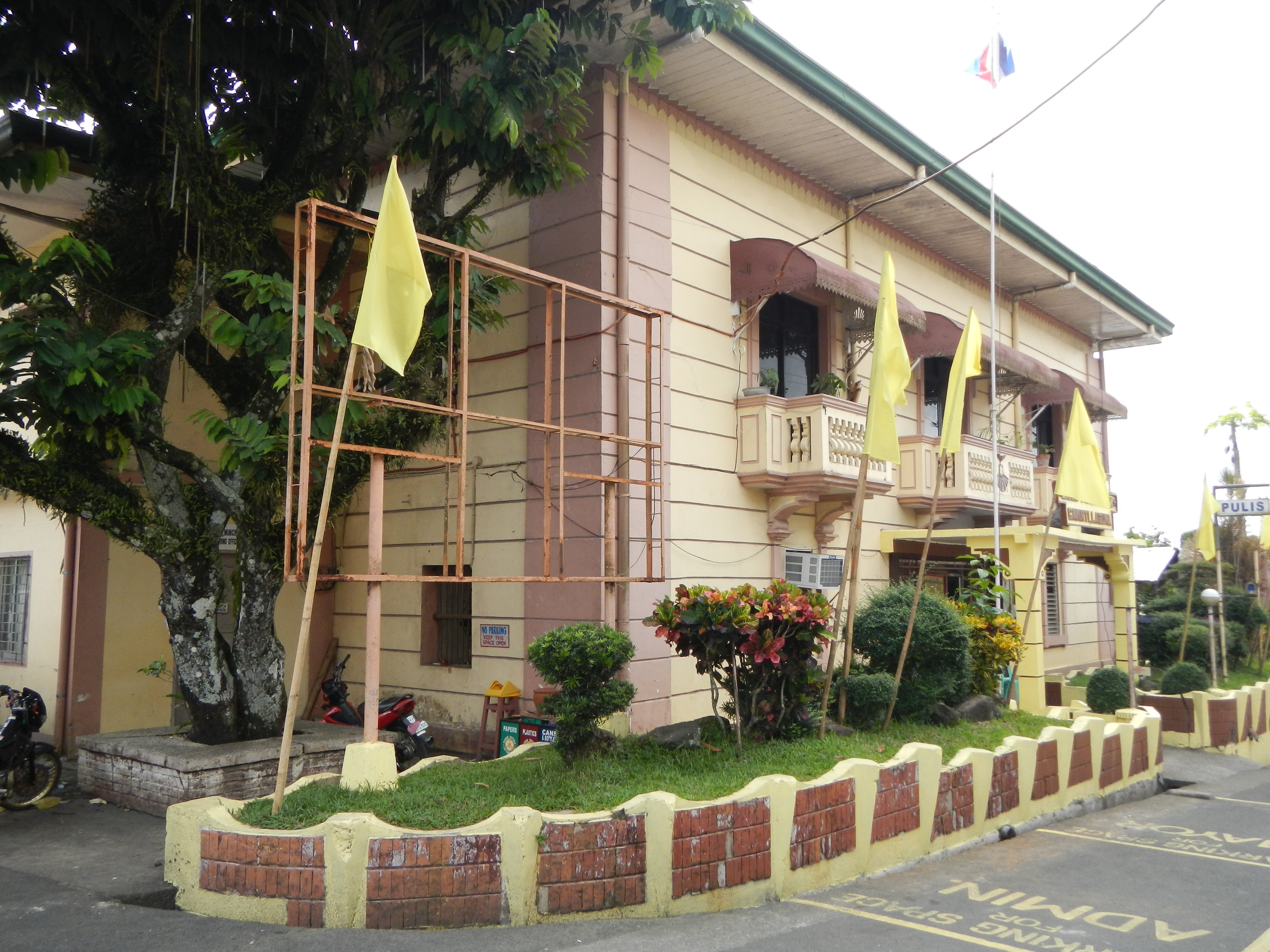
Cavinti town hall

Like other towns in the Philippines, Cavinti is governed by a mayor and vice mayor who are elected to three-year terms. The mayor is the executive head and leads the town's departments in executing the Sangguniang Bayan's ordinances and improving public services. The vice mayor heads a legislative council consisting of councilors, as members.

=== Elected officials ===
Cavinti municipal officials (2025–present)
Name	Party
Mayor
Arrantlee R. Arroyo	PFP
Vice mayor
Milbert L. Oliveros	PFP
Municipal councilors
Jose Mari L. Esguerra	Independent
Joseph P. Baltazar	Independent
Romel J. Villanueva	Independent
Jovenil T. Gordula	PFP
Godfrey L. Lubuguin	PFP
Melandro B. Lope	Akay ni Sol
Glenn Haze M. Cabuhat	PFP
Habshan Dave D. Blastique	PFP

=== Hymn ===
The official song of the Municipality of Cavinti and its people is the "Cavinti Hymn" or "Imno ng Cavinti (Filipino)". The anthem was composed by Bonifacio J. Linay, a native of Cavinti.

== Infrastructure ==
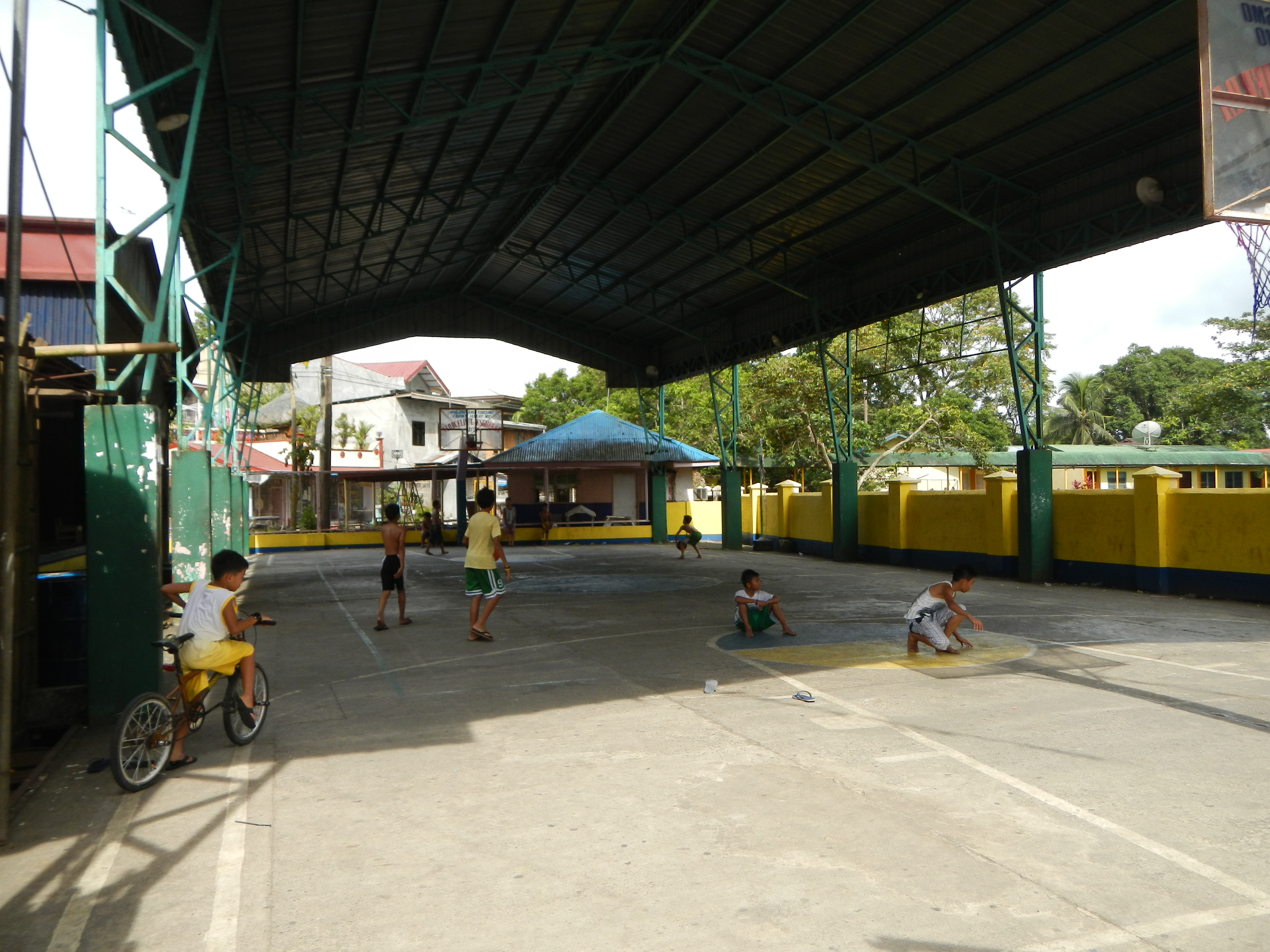
Covered court

=== Public infrastructures ===
- Municipal health clinics
- Public market
- Cavinti Covered Plaza
- Cavinti Sports Complex
- ABC Multi-Purpose Hall

=== Transportation ===
Cavinti is exactly 100 kilometres (62 mi) from Manila. From Manila via Calamba, a bus runs to Santa Cruz, Laguna. Jeepneys plying to Cavinti are present in Santa Cruz. The town of Pagsanjan would be passed by before reaching Cavinti. The Pagsanjan–Cavinti Road is especially known for being zigzagged with many sharp twists and turns. Transportation to its barangays are served by tricycles and jeepneys.

Routes/modes of transportation:

- Cavinti to Santa Cruz (jeepney - via Pagsanjan) - Main (Cavinti)
- Cavinti to Santa Cruz (jeepney - via Lumban) - Main (Cavinti)
- Lucban to Santa Cruz (mini-bus) - via Cavinti
- Lucena to Santa Cruz (mini-bus) - via Cavinti
- Luisiana to Santa Cruz (jeepney) - via Cavinti
- Infanta to Lucena (bus) - via Cavinti

Bridges:

- The two main bridges in Cavinti are located along Cavinti–Caliraya Road: the Cavinti Bridge that connects barangay Duhat and barangay Poblacion, and the Tibatib Bridge that connects barangay Tibatib and barangay Poblacion.

=== Communication ===
- Landline: PLDT
- Internet connection: SmartBroadband, Globe, PLDT
- Cellular phones: Smart, Globe, Sun Cellular, DITO 4G
- Postal service: Philpost Inc.
- Cable/PayTV: Royal Cable / Community Cable Cignal (PLDT)

=== Utilities ===
- Electricity: (FLECO) First Laguna Electric Cooperative
- Water: Cavinti Water Supply System

== Education ==
The Cavinti Schools District Office governs all educational institutions within the municipality. It oversees the management and operations of all private and public, from primary to secondary schools.

=== Primary and elementary schools ===
- Bukal Elementary School
- Bulajo Elementary School
- Burol Elementary School
- Calminue Elementary School
- Cansuso Elementary School
- Cavinti Elementary School
- Inao-Awan Elementary School
- Layasin Elementary School
- Layug Elementary School
- Lumot Elementary School
- Paowin Elementary School
- Sisilmin Elementary School
- Sumucab Elementary School
- Talaongan East Elementary School
- Talaongan West ES
- Udia Elementary School

=== Secondary schools ===
- Bukal National High School
- Cavinti National High School
- Cavinti National High School (Calminue Extension)
- Lumot National High School

=== Higher educational institutions ===
- Deaf Evangelistic Alliance Foundation
- Liceo de Cavinti
