= Lake Caliraya =

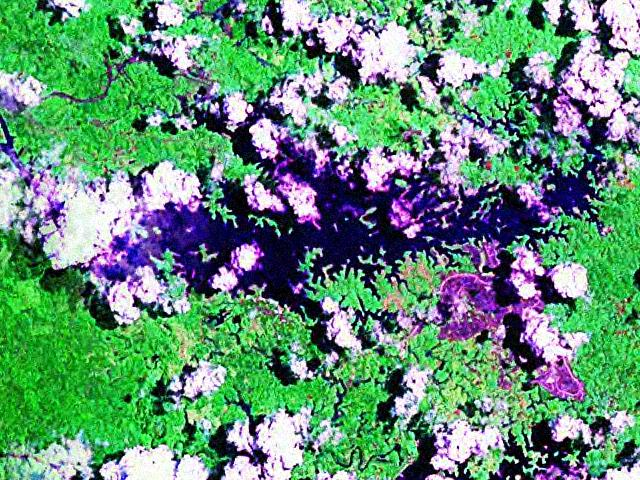
- Landsat photo

- Location within the Philippines
- Location: Laguna, Philippines
- Coordinates: 14°17′45″N 121°31′55″E
- Type: artificial lake
- Basin countries: Philippines
- Max. length: 8 km (5.0 mi)
- Max. width: 3 km (1.9 mi)
- Surface area: 1,050 ha (2,600 acres)
- Shore length^{1}: 157 km (98 mi)
- Surface elevation: 300 m (980 ft)
- Islands: over 30
- Settlements: Cavinti; Kalayaan; Lumban
- ^{1} Shore length is not a well-defined measure.

Lake Caliraya is a man-made lake situated in the municipalities of Lumban, Cavinti, and Kalayaan in the province of Laguna, Philippines. Created in 1939, the lake has developed as a destination for water sports and recreational fishing. Surrounding the lake are a number of resorts and vacation homes to accommodate tourists.

== History ==
=== Lake creation ===
Lake Caliraya was created after the construction of Caliraya Dam, an embankment dam started in 1939 by US Army Corps of Engineers Chief in the Philippines, Lieutenant Colonel (later Major General) Hugh J. Casey, with the approval of Philippine Commonwealth President Manuel L. Quezon. The Caliraya River was dammed at its outlet from a large plateau, providing a large reservoir to generate hydroelectric power for Southern Luzon. The dam was over 100 feet (30 m) high from which a diversion canal was constructed several miles to the head of a steep slope about 950 feet above Laguna de Bay. Large penstocks were constructed diverting water down to the powerhouse below, with a tailrace down to Laguna de Bay. The high head permitted the use of high-speed turbines and generators at relatively low unit costs. Initial estimate for the project was US$5 million, or ₱10 million, and an output of 40,000 horsepower.

=== World War II ===
During World War II, the dam was sabotaged by retreating Americans in 1942 to prevent its use by invading Japanese Imperial troops who rebuilt it; they themselves sabotaged it as their own defeat approached in 1944. It was rebuilt and inaugurated in 1953 by the National Power Corporation (NAPOCOR).

=== Development of the area ===
Lake Caliraya was rediscovered in the late 1960's by the Nieto and De Padua families who then popularized the lake to Manila's elite and expatriate communities. By the acquisition and consolidation of land titles surrounding the lake, they constructed a residential resort subdivision known as Sierra Lakes and the Dos Lagos Club for residents (now known as Lagos del Sol). Property values increased even more so when the main road to the lake was paved courtesy of a grant from the Japanese government and the refurbishing of the hydroelectric plant in 2004. Lake Caliraya eventually became a high-end neighborhood of elite vacation homes.

During the 1980s, the Lake Caliraya area weas occupied by locals with members of the New People's Army (NPA), which fought against destruction of local livelihood. By the middle of the decade, there has been major real estate developments along the shores of the lake, with the construction of several small resorts and Caliraya Springs, a golf course and country club. Caliraya continues to be a haven for recreation, with activities including largemouth bass fishing, wind surfing, kite boarding, wake boarding, jet skiing, water skiing, boating, golf, camping, and other sporting and recreational outdoor activities. Property values remain high, and a new generation of developments, both private and commercial, are slowly coming onstream.

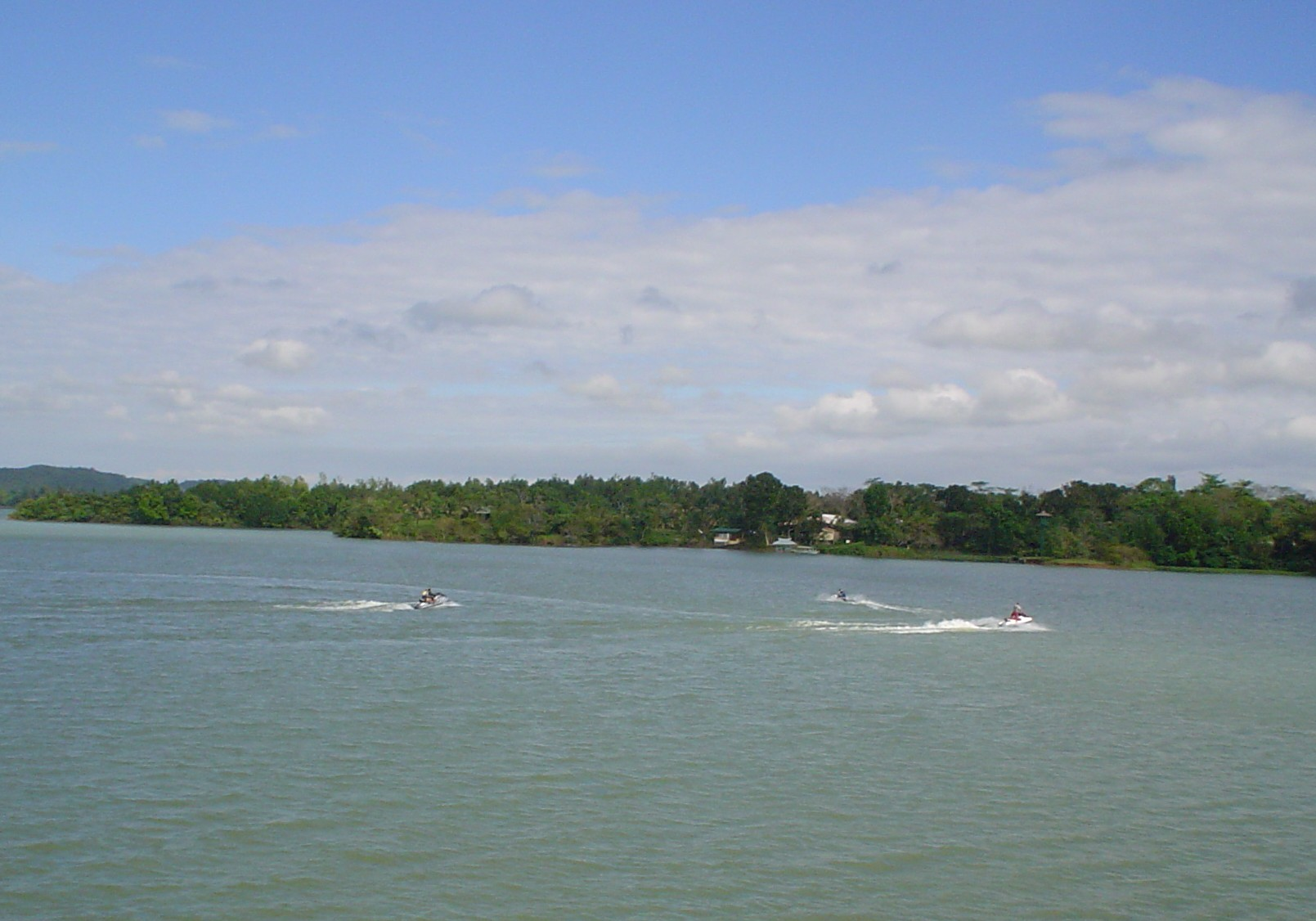
Jetskiing in Lake Caliraya

== Geography and geological phenomenon ==
Lake Caliraya is situated approximately 1,200 feet above sea level, and is perched high in the Sierra Madre. The lake experiences cool climate all year round. Winds start blowing in Lake Caliraya from the beginning of September up to late May.

Lake Caliraya's bottom, as well as the surrounding hills, are characterized by a reddish clay topsoil. The lake's floor has a very soft clay bottom. Local residents of the lake's surroundings still tell stories about certain areas in the lake that are reputed to have sucked boats down - an unfounded claim typical among superstitious locals.

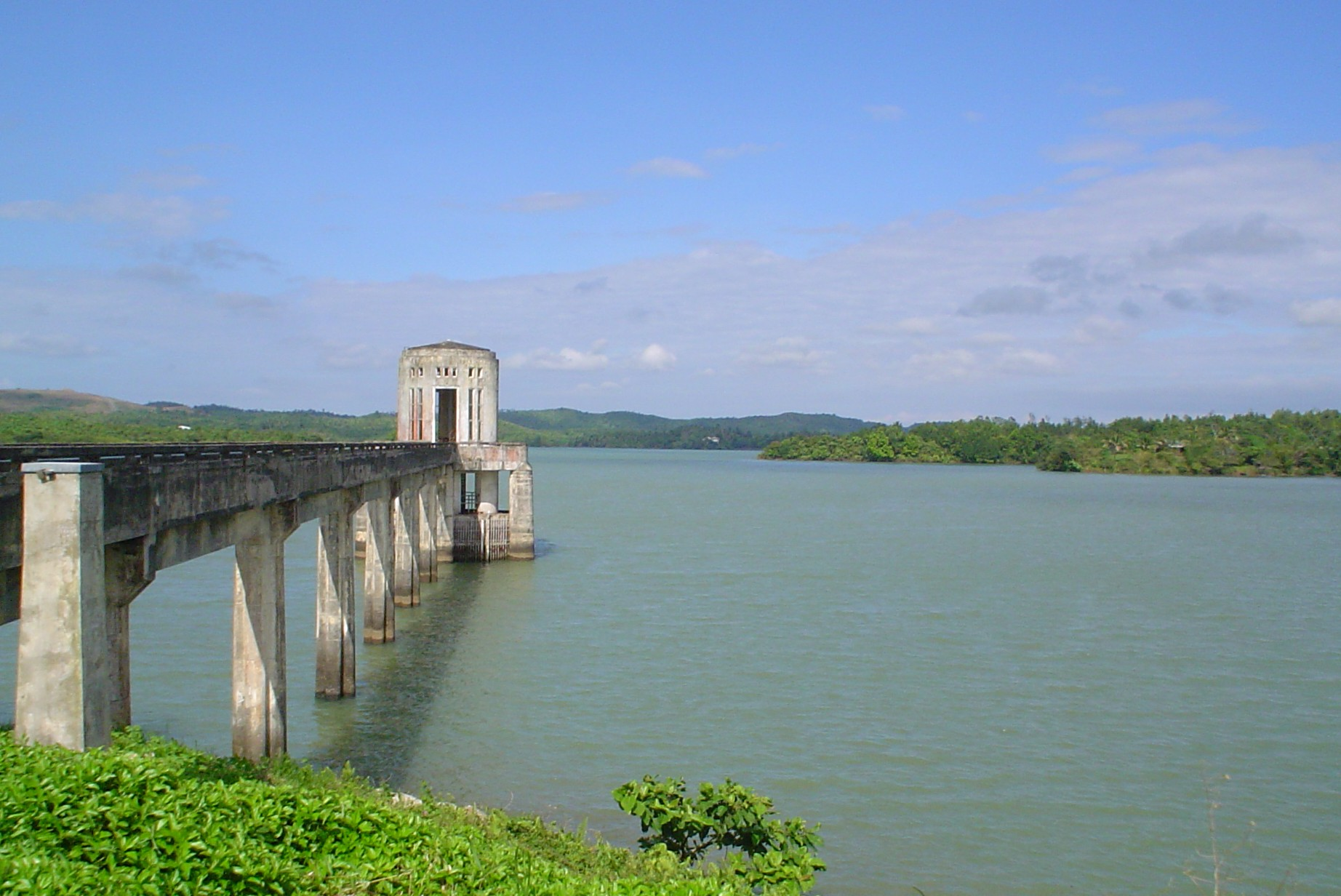
Lake Caliraya as seen from Cavinti, Laguna

== Lake surroundings and islands ==
The lake's surroundings have been compared to various North American resorts, as suggested by the abundance of pine trees which were introduced by some of the early developers to replace many of the coconut trees, as well as year-round cool climate in its green hills. Numerous islands of various sizes were formed during the damming which created the lake, and remain unnamed. The biggest island is approximately the size of Rizal Park, while the smallest is a sandbar about 3 square meters that is submerged during high water. The sandbar can be viewed from Lagos del Sol Resort.

== Bass fishing ==
The early developers (Kalaw, Nieto and the De Padua families) seeded the lake with largemouth bass, and through the years, the lake has remained the most popular bass fishing spot in the country.

== See also ==
- Caliraya Dam
