= HM Transport =

Bus company in the Philippines

HM Transport Inc.

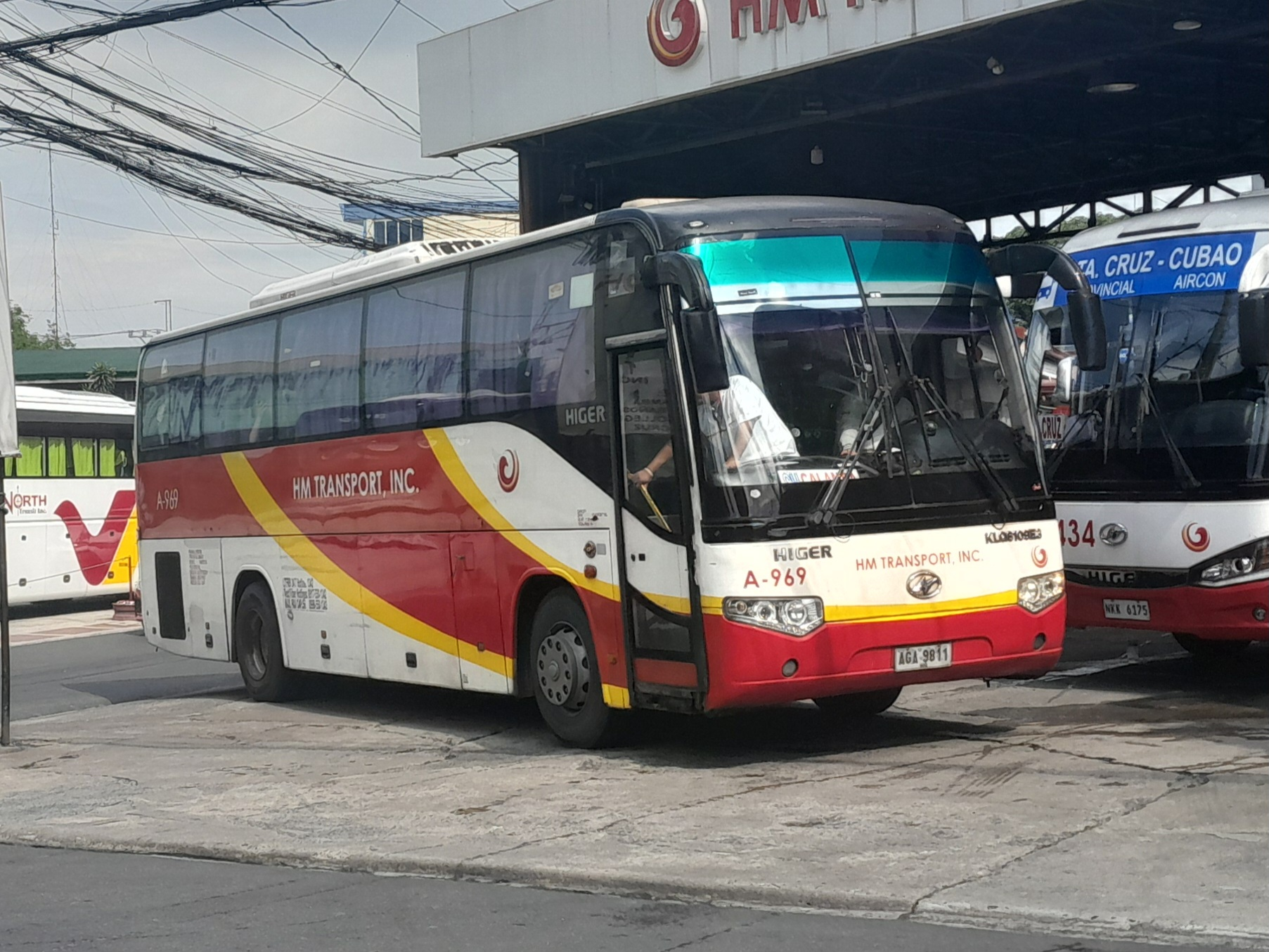
- HM Transport at the Cubao Terminal
- Founded: 2001; 25 years ago
- Headquarters: JAM Compound, Tubigan, Biñan, Laguna, Philippines
- Service area: Metro Manila, Northern and Southern Luzon
- Service type: City and Provincial Operation
- Operator: HM Transport Inc.

HM Transport Inc. is one of the largest bus companies in the Philippines. It offers both provincial and city operations, servicing routes from Metro Manila to Laguna province and vice versa. Its city operation subsidiary, Worthy Transport Inc. services routes from Airport Loop, Pasay, Plaza Lawton, Manila Lagusnilad Underpass via Taft Avenue, C5 Road, Pasig, Baclaran, Parañaque, Western Bicutan, Taguig, Ayala Avenue, Makati, Pacita Complex and Carmona, Cavite.

== Etymology ==
The bus company was derived from the initials of its founder, Homer Mercado, a bus operator, who was believed to be a grand nephew of Filipino national hero, Jose Rizal. He is the president of the Southern Luzon Bus Operators Association (SOLUBOA) and has been a party-list representative of United Transport Coalition (commonly known as 1-UTAK partylist) (now 1-JAM G Partylist).

== History ==
Before HM Transport was formed, a bus company named Laguna Transport Company Inc. or LTCI, a sister company of JAM was established in the early 1980s. It services routes from Santa Cruz, Laguna, to Lawton, Manila via Taft Avenue, and Cubao, Quezon City, along with other competitors, Kapalaran Bus Lines, also a provincial bus company that is established in the same decade; however, it was phased out in the mid-1990s due to labor disputes, and Batangas Laguna Tayabas Bus Company Inc. (now Del Monte Land Transport Bus Company or DLTBCo).

In 2001, a major split out occurred. This resulted to forming of HM Transport Inc. that serves routes from Santa Cruz, Laguna, to Cubao, Quezon City, and Alabang, Muntinlupa. Another one is Green Star Express, a provincial bus company servicing routes, this time, from the same place to Lawton, Manila. Thus, the brand name Laguna Transport Company Inc. was then changed into its new name Laguna Express Inc. or LEI, but it was rebranded into Calamba Megatrans Inc. in 2007. This bus company services Calamba-Plaza Lawton, Manila route, the Santa Cruz - Cubao route, and for a time, the Alabang - Santa Cruz route. Both HM Transport and Green Star Express dominate other provincial buses in Laguna. With its terminal at Barangay Pagsawitan, Pagsanjan, Laguna after passing through Santa Cruz, Laguna, these bus companies share each other at the old garage of defunct Kapalaran Bus Lines. After the JAC Liner Inc. buy out of Green Star Express Inc and Laguna Express Inc., the terminal was moved to the former HM Liner terminal.

In July 2019, HM Transport launched their P2P route for Balagtas, Pandi making the first bus route in the city, and Plaridel from Trinoma.

In March 2024, HM Transport launched their route between Alabang and Tutuban as part of their bus augmentation of the PNR Metro Commuter Line, following the construction of North–South Commuter Railway.

In May 2026, HM Transport announced to launched their inter-provincial route between Turbina, Calamba and Baguio City with a total of 12 trips per day using Zhongtong buses in their hybrid Victory Liner livery.

== Routes ==
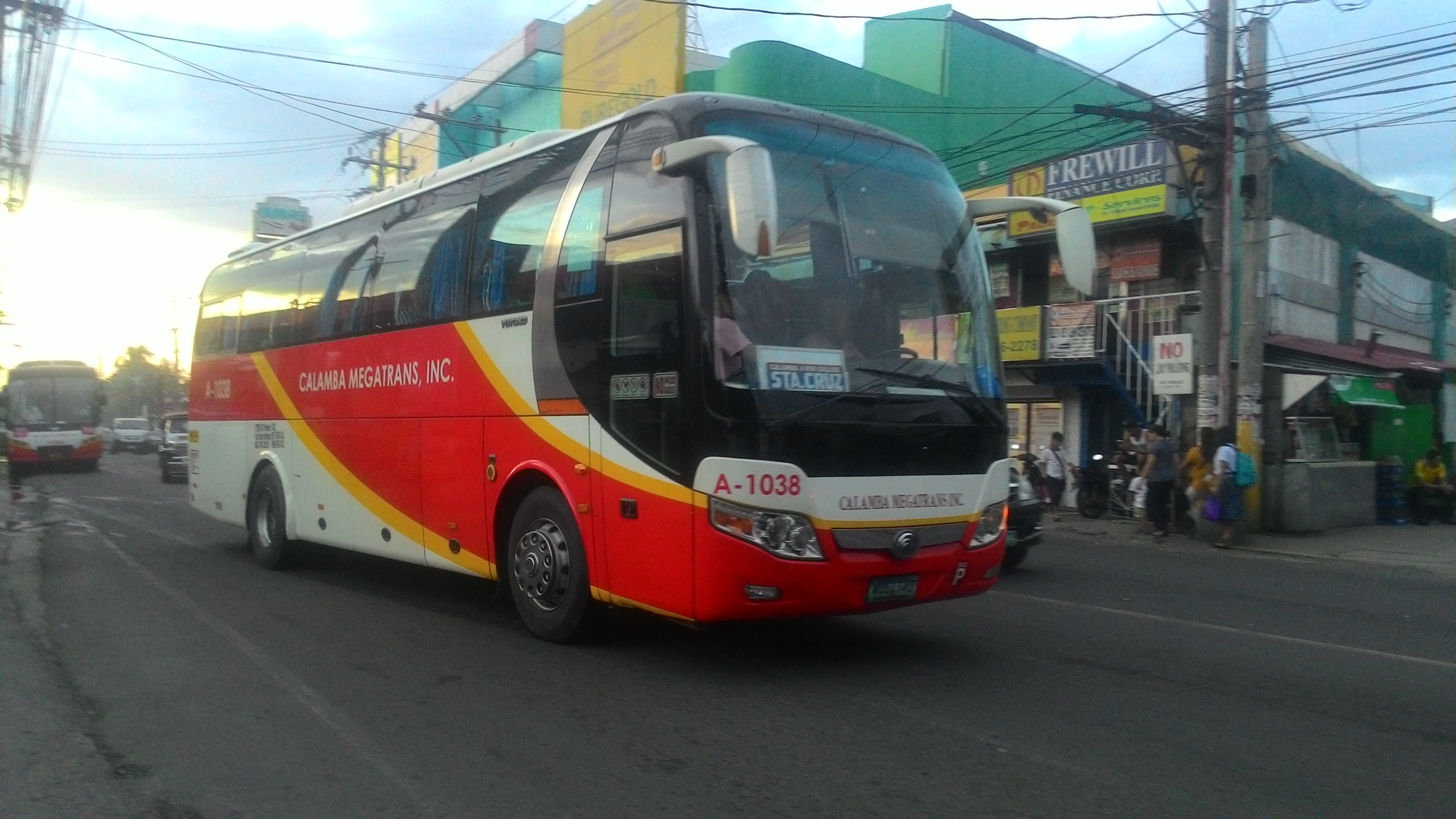
A Calamba Megatrans Inc. Yutong ZK6107HA heading to Santa Cruz from Cubao. This was originally Lucena Lines Inc./Calamba Megatrans Inc. 5915 before being renumbered.

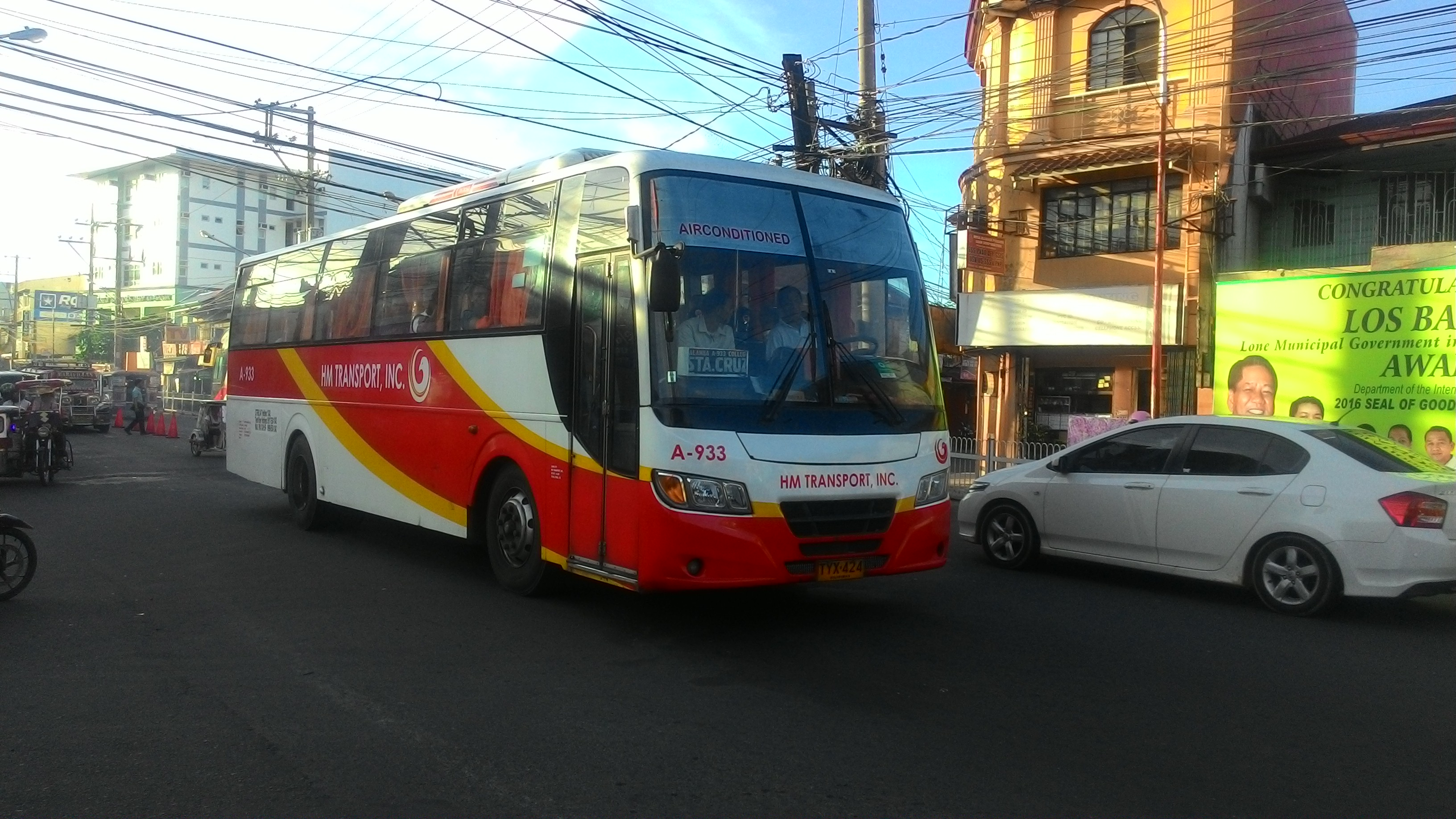
This bus was burned down by unknown persons, but HMTI rehabbed it and served the Santa Cruz - Alabang line. It was moved to Calamba - Cubao line soon after. As of today, it serves a company shuttle bus.

=== City Operation ===
- Ayala Center, Makati - Market! Market!, Taguig or SM Aura Premier, Taguig via Fort Bonifacio Global City Kalayaan Avenue - operates under memorandum of agreement with Bonifacio Transport Corporation (also known as BGC Bus), a bus company under Fort Bonifacio Development Corp., a conglomerate of Ayala Corporation and SM Investments supports by SM Supermalls.
- Alabang - Lawton via Skyway, SLEX, Buendia, Taft Avenue (uses regular buses.)
- Airport Loop - Pasay Rotonda Terminal - NAIA Terminal 3 via Resorts World Manila, New Port City, Marriott Hotel, Remington Hotel & Baclaran

=== Provincial Operation ===
- Santa Cruz, Laguna - Cubao, Quezon City via EDSA / C5 Taguig, SLEX
- Santa Cruz, Laguna - Alabang, Muntinlupa via SLEX (uses air-conditioned buses)
- Calamba, Laguna - Alabang, Muntinlupa via SLEX (operated by HM Transport Inc.)
- Calamba, Laguna - Lawton via Mayapa - some of the Santa Cruz fleet are stationed here, along with new buses.
- Calamba, Laguna - Cubao, Quezon City via EDSA / C5, SLEX, Mayapa
- Pacita Complex, San Pedro, Laguna - Plaza, Lawton, Manila via SLEX (operated by South City Express Inc./Pacita Liner Inc.)
- Cabuyao, Laguna via Balibago Complex, Santa Rosa, Laguna - Cubao Quezon City via EDSA / C5, SLEX Balibago Exit
- Calamba, Laguna - Baguio City, Benguet (Operated by HM Transport Inc. in Cooperation with Victory Liner)
- Calamba, Laguna - Tuguegarao City, Cagayan (Operated by HM Transport Inc. in Cooperation with Victory Liner)
- Calamba, Laguna - Iba, Zambales (Operated by HM Transport Inc. in Cooperation with Victory Liner)

=== P2P Service ===
- Pacita Complex, San Pedro City, Laguna - Market! Market! BGC Taguig via SLEX C-5 Exit (Daily from 9am to 1:45am). *Express Connect
- Pacita Complex, San Pedro City, Laguna - Venice Megaworld Mall McKinley Via SLEX Taguig
- Nuvali/Balibago Complex, Sta. Rosa Laguna - Market! Market! BGC Taguig via SLEX C-5 Exit.

=== Premium P2P Service ===
- Robinsons Galleria (Quezon City) - Glorietta 3 (Makati)
- Alabang Town Center (Muntinlupa) - Market! Market! (Taguig)

== Subsidiaries ==
- Worthy Transport Inc. - a city operation division of HM Transport Inc.
- South City Express Inc.
- Silver Star Shuttle Tours and Transport, Inc.
- Pascual Liner operated by HM Transport (Collaboration).
- Original Transport Service Cooperative Inc.

== Former Bus Companies ==
- South Star Transport Express Inc.
- Quezon Liner Inc.
- Grand Star Coach Bus Co. Inc.
- Laguna Trans Co., Inc.
- Pacita Liner, Inc.
- Juaymah Maureen Transport (franchise absorbed by South City Express Inc.)
- Laguna Express Inc. (franchise transferred to JAC Liner Inc.)
- Green Star Express Inc. (Sta. Cruz line transferred to JAC Liner Inc.)
- Delta Transport Inc./Tessele One Liner Inc. - Sold to RMB Line Inc. and DSN Transport.
- Calamba Megatrans Inc. (absorbed by HM Transport Inc.)
- BCB Transport Inc. (franchises divided and absorbed by CEM Trans Services Inc. and Worthy Transport Inc.)
- Batangas Star Express Corp./KL CNG Bus Transport Corp.
- Pandacan Transport Inc. (Alabang - Lawton franchise absorbed by HM Transport Inc.)

== See also ==
- List of bus companies of the Philippines
