= Santa Cruz, Laguna =

Capital of Laguna, Philippines

Santa Cruz
- Municipality
- Municipality of Santa Cruz
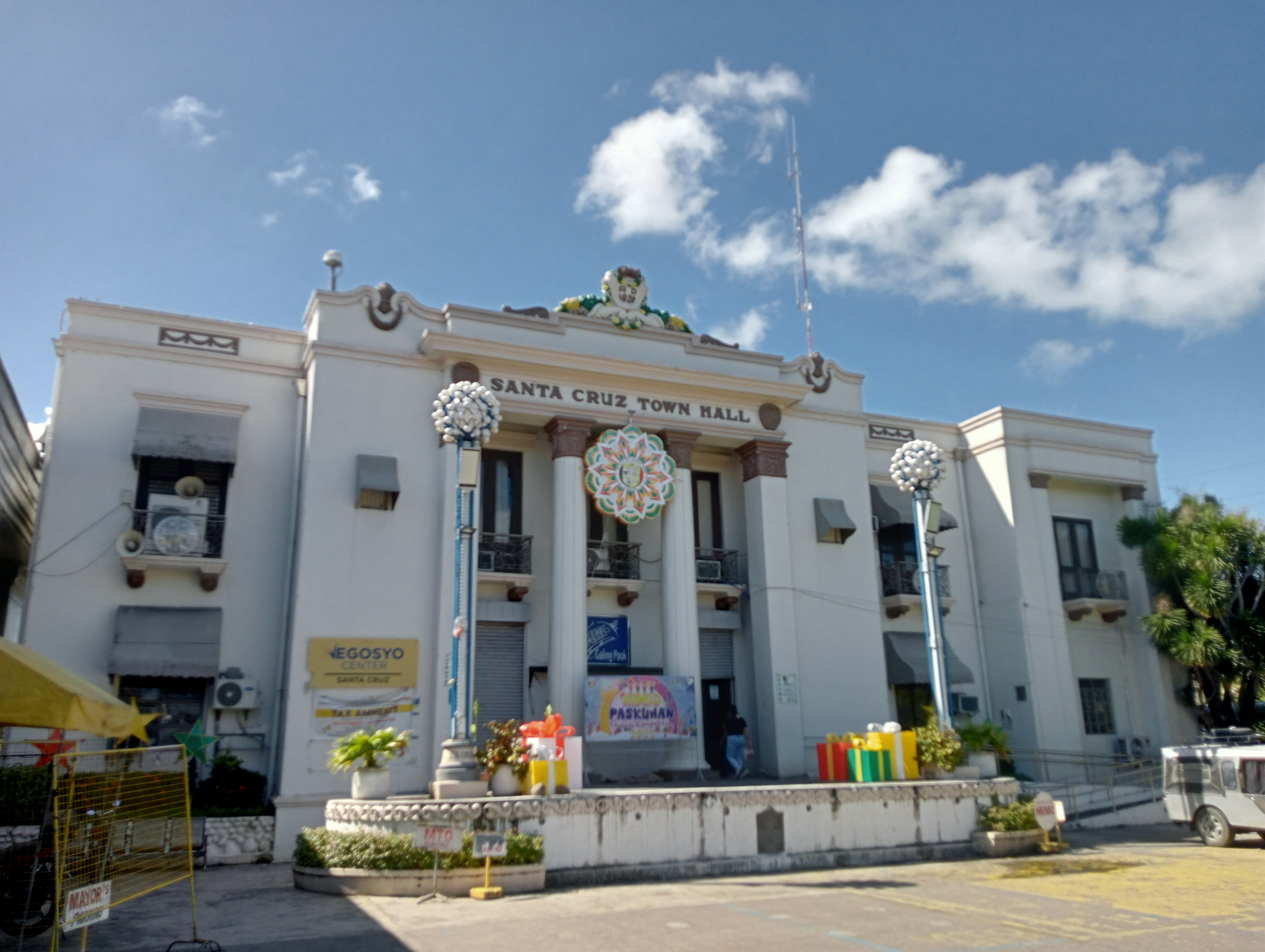
- Municipal Hall

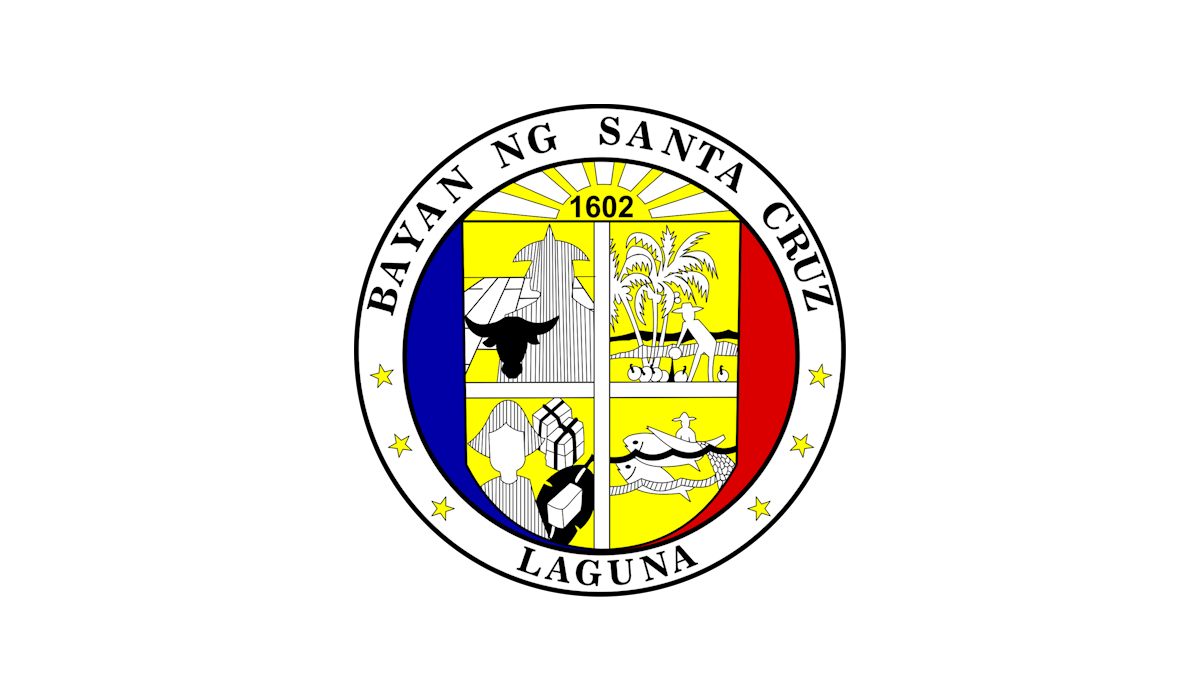
- Flag Seal
- Nicknames: Laguna's Capital, The Heartland of Calabarzon, Santa Cruz the Land of Star
- Motto: SENTRO NG PAGUNLAD SANTA CRUZ!
- Anthem: Himno ng Santa Cruz
- Map of Laguna with Santa Cruz highlighted
- Interactive map of Santa Cruz
- Location within the Philippines
- Coordinates: 14°17′N 121°25′E
- Country: Philippines
- Region: Calabarzon
- Province: Laguna
- District: 4th district
- Founded: September 6, 1602
- Named for: Holy Cross
- Barangays: 26 (see Barangays)

Government
  - Type: Sangguniang Bayan
  - Mayor: Benjo Agarao (PFP)
  - Vice Mayor: Laarni A. Malibiran (Independent)
  - Representative: Benjamin Cueto "Benjie" Agarao Jr. (PFP)
  - Municipal Council: Members: Ambiel John C. Panganiban; Norman T. Tolentino; Lea A. Almarvez; Jericho V. Asinas; Roselon F. Pamatmat; Esmeraldo C. De Las Armas Jr.; Rizaldy N. Kalaw; Louie C. De Leon; Laura P. Obligacion(ABC President); Mark Anthony M. Juangco(SKF President)
  - Electorate: 80,643 voters (2025)

Area
  - Total: 38.59 km^{2} (14.90 sq mi)
- Elevation: 12 m (39 ft)
- Highest elevation: 54 m (177 ft)
- Lowest elevation: 0 m (0 ft)

Population (2024 census)
  - Total: 126,844
  - Density: 3,287/km^{2} (8,513/sq mi)
  - Households: 31,029
- Demonym(s): Santa Cruzeño (masculine); Santa Cruzeña (feminine)

Economy
  - Income class: 1st municipal income class
  - Poverty incidence: 7.64% (2023)
  - Revenue: ₱ 511.9 million (2024)
  - Assets: ₱ 717.6 million (2024)
  - Expenditure: ₱ 279.5 million (2024)
  - Liabilities: ₱ 27.82 million (2024)

Service provider
  - Electricity: Manila Electric Company (Meralco)
- Time zone: UTC+8 (PST)
- ZIP code: 4009
- PSGC: 0403426000
- IDD : area code: +63 (0)49
- Native languages: Tagalog
- Major religions: Catholicism; Aglipayan Church; Protestantism; Islam
- Feast date: December 8 (Feast of the Immaculate Conception); June 4 (Feast of the Our Lady of Maulawin)
- Ecclesiastical dioceses: Diocese of San Pablo (Catholic); Diocese of Laguna (Aglipayan Church)
- Patron saints: Immaculate Conception (Catholic); Our Lady of Maulawin (Aglipayan Church)

Santa Cruz, officially the Municipality of Santa Cruz (Tagalog: Bayan ng Santa Cruz), is a municipality and capital of the province of Laguna, Philippines. According to the 2024 census, it has a population of 126,844 people.

It is known for its white cheese, locally called kesong puti, freshly crafted from carabao's milk.

== History ==
=== Spanish colonial period ===
During the late 16th century, Santa Cruz was a densely populated barrio of the present-day municipality of Lumban, along with neighboring areas that would later become towns such as Pagsanjan, Cavinti, Paete and Pangil. On September 6, 1602, Santa Cruz separated from Lumban and became a pueblo with its church and local government. For being in an unhealthy state, the center of the town was moved in 1608 to where it is today.

Since its foundation in 1602, the town had been ravaged by calamitous forces such as fires, typhoons, floods and human vandalism during the Philippine Revolution of 1896–1899, the war of the Philippine Independence (1899–1902), the Battle of Santa Cruz and the assault of the tulisanes (bandits) during the Spanish period.

Characterized by fertile flatlands along the coastal plains of Laguna de Bay, the town's economic base has traditionally been anchored on two primary industries, namely agriculture and fishing, which remain in the present. In view of Santa Cruz's strategic location relative to the other coastal settlements around the lake, trading activities have likewise been rooted in the town during those early settlement days. The town proper, which has always been the focal point of activities, used to be accessible to the other lakeshore areas via the navigable Santa Cruz River, aside from Laguna de Bay itself. Since those early days, water has been the principal mode of transportation.

=== World War II ===
The Filipino guerrillas and irregular forces also came from the town and were involved in the Second Battle of Santa Cruz on January 26, 1945.

=== Modern period ===
Today, Santa Cruz serves as the capital of Laguna and is considered the business and commercial center of the eastern part of the province.

== Geography ==
Situated in the central portion of Laguna province along the southeastern coast of Laguna de Bay, Santa Cruz lies 87 kilometres (54 mi) southeast of Metro Manila via Calamba and is located at approximately 14 degrees 17 minutes north latitude and 121 degrees 25 minutes east longitude. The municipality is bounded on the north and northwest by Laguna de Bay, on the northeast by Lumban, on the east by Pagsanjan, on the southeast by Magdalena, on the south by Liliw, and on the southwest by Pila. It has 26 barangays and covers an approximate land area of 3,860 hectares (9,500 acres), which comprises about 2% of Laguna's total land area.

It is situated on the banks of the Santa Cruz River, which flows into the eastern part of Laguna de Bay. It is 88 kilometres (55 mi) from Manila via Calamba and Los Baños. It is accessible by land from Metro Manila, passing through Rizal Province via the Manila East Road or Western Laguna via the South Luzon Expressway (SLEX).

- Land Area: 3,860 hectares
- Residential: 381.97
- Commercial: 35.96
- Institutional: 92.17
- Functional Open Space: 31.27
- Roads: 157.73
- Total Built-up: 696.10
- Agricultural: 3,048.57
- Special Use: 115.33

=== Geology ===
The two types of rocks found in Santa Cruz are alluvium and clastic rocks. Clastic rocks are located in the eastern portion of the municipality, specifically in Barangays Alipit, San Jose, Oogong, Jasaan, San Juan, Palasan, and portions of Barangays Pagsawitan, Patimbao, Bubukal, Labuin and Malinao. These rocks consist of interbedded shale and sandstone with occasional thin lenses of limestone, tuff and reworked sandy tuffs, calcareous sandstone and partly tuffaceous shale.

=== Climate ===
Like most areas in the province of Laguna, the climate of Santa Cruz is characterized by two pronounced seasons: dry from January to April and wet for the rest of the year. The municipality has an annual temperature of 27.2 °C and an annual rainfall of 1962.7 mm. Northeasterly winds with an average wind speed of 9 knots prevail in the municipality.

Climate data for Santa Cruz, Laguna
Month	Jan	Feb	Mar	Apr	May	Jun	Jul	Aug	Sep	Oct	Nov	Dec	Year
Mean daily maximum °C (°F)	26 (79)	27 (81)	29 (84)	31 (88)	35 (95)	35 (95)	29 (84)	29 (84)	29 (84)	29 (84)	28 (82)	26 (79)	29 (85)
Mean daily minimum °C (°F)	17 (63)	17 (63)	19 (66)	23 (73)	23 (73)	25 (77)	24 (75)	24 (75)	24 (75)	24 (75)	19 (66)	19 (66)	22 (71)
Average precipitation mm (inches)	58 (2.3)	41 (1.6)	32 (1.3)	29 (1.1)	91 (3.6)	143 (5.6)	181 (7.1)	162 (6.4)	172 (6.8)	164 (6.5)	113 (4.4)	121 (4.8)	1,307 (51.5)
Average rainy days	13.4	9.3	9.1	9.8	19.1	22.9	26.6	24.9	25.0	21.4	16.5	16.5	214.5
Source: Meteoblue

=== Barangays ===
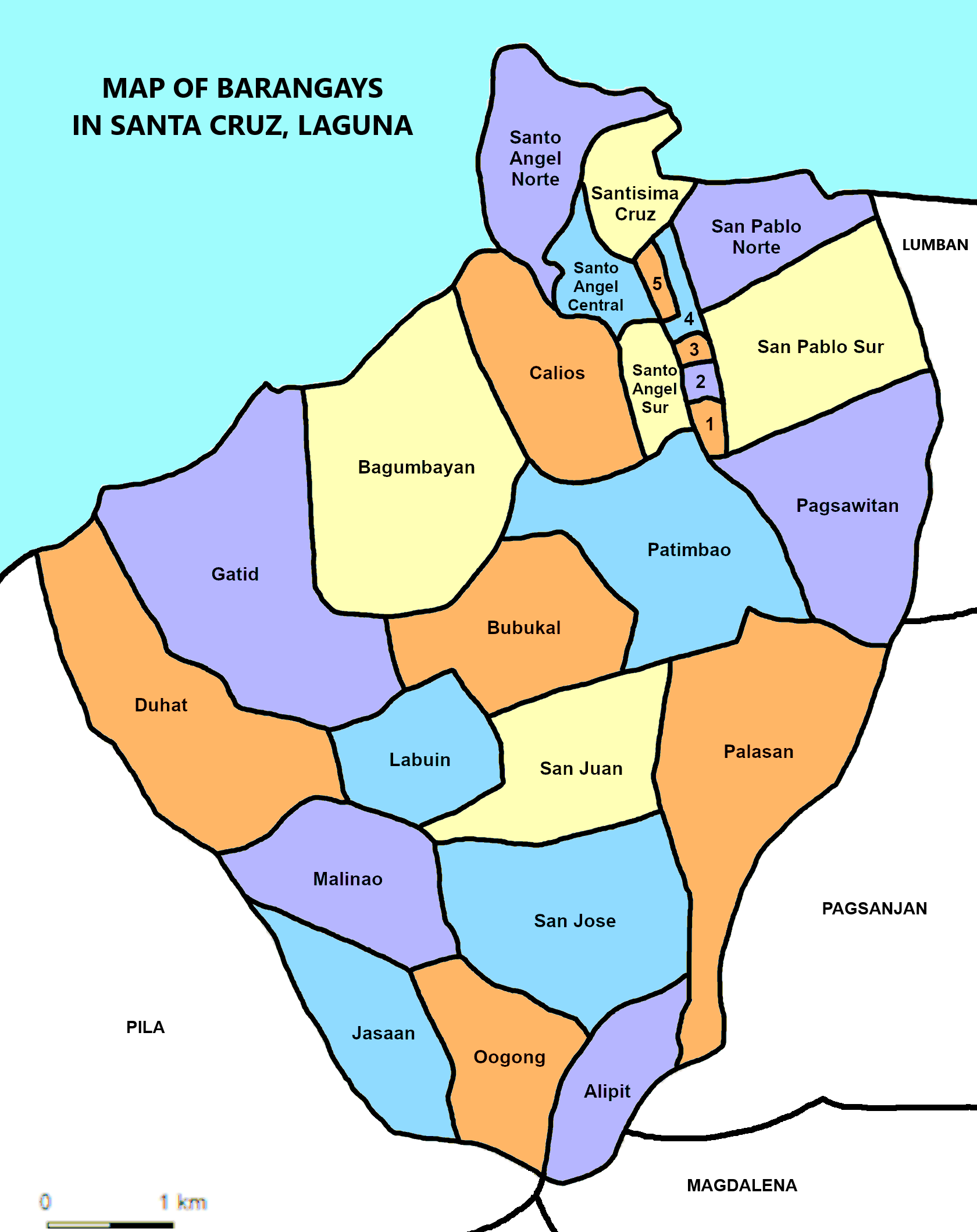
Map of Santa Cruz, Laguna

Santa Cruz is politically subdivided into 26 barangays, as indicated below. The town is composed of five barangays in the Poblacion area and 21 classified urban barangays.

- Alipit
- Bagumbayan
- Bubukal
- Calios
- Duhat
- Gatid
- Jasaan
- Labuin
- Malinao
- Oogong
- Pagsawitan
- Palasan
- Patimbao
- Poblacion I
- Poblacion II
- Poblacion III
- Poblacion IV
- Poblacion V
- San Jose
- San Juan
- San Pablo Norte
- San Pablo Sur
- Santisima Cruz
- Santo Angel Central
- Santo Angel Norte
- Santo Angel Sur

== Demographics ==
In the 2024 census, the population of Santa Cruz was 126,844 people, with a density of 3,300 inhabitants per square kilometre or 8,500 inhabitants per square mile.

Population census of Santa Cruz
Year	Pop.	±% p.a.
1903	12,747	—
1918	14,156	+0.70%
1939	17,649	+1.06%
1948	22,534	+2.75%
1960	32,850	+3.19%
1970	47,114	+3.67%
1975	52,672	+2.26%
1980	60,620	+2.85%
1990	76,603	+2.37%
1995	86,978	+2.41%
2000	92,694	+1.37%
2007	101,914	+1.32%
2010	110,943	+3.14%
2015	117,605	+1.12%
2020	123,574	+1.05%
2024	126,844	+0.63%
Source: Philippine Statistics Authority

== Economy ==
Santa Cruz is considered the service and commercial center of the eastern part of the province. Although relatively far from the immediate urbanizing influence of Metropolitan Manila, Santa Cruz continues to progress. Santa Cruz has also been the seat of the provincial government since 1885, giving the municipality an additional administrative function over the entire province.

It also functions as the service center for transportation, commerce, health, education, and other social services for the predominantly rural northeastern municipalities of the province. The incipient and fast-growing agribusiness industries, such as livestock raising, horticulture and aquaculture, boost the municipal economy. The town is composed of 26 urban barangays.

Poverty incidence of Santa Cruz (%)

Source: Philippine Statistics Authority

=== Commerce ===
Santa Cruz serves as the provincial service center, particularly for the municipalities in its northeastern part.

Trade and commerce remain some of the primary economic activities in the locality. The presence of jeepney services plying Lumban, Paete, Siniloan, San Pablo, Pila, Victoria, Cavinti-Caliraya, Luisiana, Majayjay, Calumpang, Nagcarlan, Liliw, Magdalena, Pagsanjan, Lucban, Lucena and Calamba has further enhanced the municipality's role as a commerce and trade center.

The center of business activities is in the poblacion, specifically Barangay V, where the four buildings of the Public Market are situated.

Santa Cruz has many establishments that contribute to its development. Development in this vicinity has been of a quasi-residential commercial type, manifested by the proliferation of structures used for both business and residential purposes by the proprietors/owners. There is also a concentration of business establishments along the section of the national highway, especially Barangay Gatid, where a mall is located, and the abandoned PNR Railway (road), while a strip pattern of commercial development is noticeable along Quezon Avenue, the old highway and Pedro Guevarra Avenue. Along P. Guevarra Avenue, several establishments are also located such as hospitals, a Meralco office, a PLDT office, Red Cross, several banking institutions, and Executive Eminent Lending Company. There is also SL Agritech Corporation in Barangay Oogong.

=== Tax collection ===
Annual local government collection:

- 2008 — ₱ 160,196,679.38
- 2007 — ₱ 135,792,097.46
- 2006 — ₱ 128,812,429.41
- 2005 — ₱ 117,351,293.14

== Tourism ==
=== Points of interest ===
Santa Cruz has famous white cheese or kesong puti, freshly made from carabao's milk.

- Immaculate Concepcion Parish Church (Catholic)
- Cathedral of the Our Lady of Maulawin (Aglipayan Church)
- Emilio Jacinto Shrine Burial Site
- Villa Valenzuela
- Santa Cruz Town Plaza
- Provincial Capitol of Laguna

=== Events ===
Santa Cruz hosted the Palarong Pambansa from May 4–10, 2014.

Festivals

- Kesong puti Festival — April 4–11
- Anilag Festival

== Government ==
=== List of Mayors ===
No.	Name	Party	Elec.	Term start	Term end	Vice mayor
1	Rufo de Borja (1930−2014)	Liberal	1965	December 30, 1965	June 30, 1980	Romeo Ramos
1	Rufo de Borja (1930−2014)	Nacionalista	1967	December 30, 1965	June 30, 1980	Enrique Bautista
1	Rufo de Borja (1930−2014)	Nacionalista	1971	December 30, 1965	June 30, 1980	Enrique Bautista
1	Rufo de Borja (1930−2014)	KBL	1971	December 30, 1965	June 30, 1980	Enrique Bautista
2	Enrique Bautista (Born 1932)	KBL	1980	June 30, 1980	May 23, 1986	Jose Uriarte
2	Enrique Bautista (Born 1932)	Independent	1980	June 30, 1980	May 23, 1986	Jose Uriarte
2	Enrique Bautista (Born 1932)	Nacionalista	1980	June 30, 1980	May 23, 1986	Jose Uriarte
–	Oscar Feliciano (Died 2020)	Independent	—	May 25, 1986	February 1, 1988	Romeo Ramos
3	Rodolfo San Luis (1946–2010)	Lakas	1988	February 2, 1988	June 30, 1995	Reynaldo Limjuco
3	Rodolfo San Luis (1946–2010)	LDP	1992	February 2, 1988	June 30, 1995	Ruy Lopez
4	Domingo Panganiban (1948–2021)	LDP	1995	June 30, 1995	November 20, 1995	Narciso Infante
(2)	Enrique Bautista (Born 1932)	Lakas–CMD	1995	November 17, 1995	June 30, 1998	Narciso Infante
(4)	Domingo Panganiban (1948–2021)	LAMMP	1998	June 30, 1998	June 30, 2007	Heidi Ciriaco
(4)	Domingo Panganiban (1948–2021)	LDP	2001	June 30, 1998	June 30, 2007	Ariel Magcalas
(4)	Domingo Panganiban (1948–2021)	LDP	2004	June 30, 1998	June 30, 2007	Ariel Magcalas
5	Ariel Magcalas (born 1965)	Liberal	2007	June 30, 2007	June 30, 2010	Alan Pamatmat
(4)	Domingo Panganiban (1948–2021)	PMP	2010	June 30, 2010	June 30, 2019	Louie C de Leon
(4)	Domingo Panganiban (1948–2021)	Liberal	2013	June 30, 2010	June 30, 2019	Louie C de Leon
(4)	Domingo Panganiban (1948–2021)	Liberal	2016	June 30, 2010	June 30, 2019	Louie C de Leon
6	Edgar San Luis (born 1955)	Nacionalista	2019	June 30, 2019	June 30, 2025	Laarni Malibiran
6	Edgar San Luis (born 1955)	Aksyon	2022	June 30, 2019	June 30, 2025	Laarni Malibiran
6	Edgar San Luis (born 1955)	NUP	2022	June 30, 2019	June 30, 2025	Laarni Malibiran

=== Elections ===
==== 2022 Santa Cruz local elections ====
2022 Santa Cruz Mayoral election
Party	Candidate	Votes	%
Aksyon	Edgar San Luis(Incumbent)	33,062	50.97
PDP–Laban	Benjamin Agarao Jr.	31,809	49.03
Total votes		64,871	100.00
Aksyon hold			

2022 Santa Cruz Vice mayoral election
Party	Candidate	Votes	%
PROMDI	Laarni Malibiran (Incumbent)	37,099	59.74
Aksyon	Louie De Leon	24,997	40.26
Total votes		62,096	100.00
PROMDI hold			

==== 2019 Santa Cruz local elections ====
2019 Santa Cruz Mayoral election
Party	Candidate	Votes	%
Nacionalista	Edgar San Luis	25,075	48.09
PDP–Laban	Benjo Agarao	23,547	45.16
KDP	Ariel Magcalas	3,521	6.75
Total votes		52,143	100.00
Nacionalista hold			

2019 Santa Cruz Vice mayoral election
Party	Candidate	Votes	%
KDP	Laarni Malibiran	23,149	45.38
Nacionalista	Domingo "Dennis" Panganiban	15,189	29.78
PDP–Laban	Rizaldy "Pasirit" Kalaw	12,669	24.84
Total votes		51,007	100.00
KDP hold			

==== 2016 Santa Cruz local elections ====
2016 Santa Cruz Mayoral election
Party	Candidate	Votes	%
Liberal	Domingo Panganiban	32,605	69.07
UNA	Ariel Magcalas	14,604	30.93
Total votes		47,209	100.00
Liberal hold			

2016 Santa Cruz Vice Mayoral election
Party	Candidate	Votes	%
Liberal	Louie De Leon	25,836	55.99
UNA	Efren Diaz	20,306	44.01
Total votes		46,142	100.00
Liberal hold			

==== 2013 Santa Cruz local elections ====
2013 Santa Cruz Mayoral elections
Party	Candidate	Votes	%
Liberal	Domingo Panganiban (Incumbent)	21,770	54.73
Independent	Ramon Tan	9,187	23.10
UNA	Ariel Magcalas	8,821	22.18
Total votes		41,598	100.00
Liberal hold			

2013 Santa Cruz Vice mayoral election
Party	Candidate	Votes	%
Liberal	Louie De Leon	25,909	71.02
Independent	Bryan Lateo	10,571	28.98
Total votes		41,598	100.00
Liberal hold			

==== 2010 Santa Cruz local elections ====
2010 Santa Cruz Mayoral election
Party	Candidate	Votes	%
PMP	Domingo Panganiban	15,908	37.92
Liberal	Benjamin Agarao Jr.	13,867	33.06
Lakas–Kampi	Ariel Magcalas	12,175	29.02
Total votes		41,950	100.00
PMP hold			

2010 Santa Cruz Vice mayoral eoection
Party	Candidate	Votes	%
Lakas–Kampi	Louie De Leon	18,315	46.32
NPC	Roselon Pamatmat	12,495	31.60
Liberal	Alan Pamatmat	8,728	22.07
Total votes		44,091	100.00
Lakas–Kampi hold			

== Education ==
The Santa Cruz Schools District Office governs all educational institutions within the municipality. It oversees the management and operations of all private and public schools from the primary to secondary levels.

=== Primary and elementary schools ===
- Bagumbayan Elementary School
- Bubukal Elementary School
- Calios Elementary School
- Capitol View Christian School
- Duhat Elementary School
- Gatid Elementary School
- GOAL-DEN Learners Center
- iExcel Learning Hub
- Laguna Santiago Educational Foundation
- Little Javannah Montessori School
- Maranatha Christian Academy
- Mind Builders Academy
- Oogong Elementary School
- Our Lady of Maulawin Educational Foundation
- Pagsawitan Elementary School
- Palasan Elementary School
- Patimbao Elementary School
- Rabbi Excellent Christian School
- San Jose Elementary School
- Santa Cruz Central Elementary School (The Central School of Santa Cruz)
- Santisima Cruz Elementary School
- Santo Angel Central Elementary School
- Santo Angel Norte Elementary School
- Santo Angel Sur Elementary School
- SHARPMINDS Tutorial Center
- Silangan Elementary School
- Southbay Montessori School
- United Evangelical Church School

=== Secondary schools ===
- Basic Christian International School and Special Education Center
- Immaculate Conception Catholic College
- Laguna Senior High School
- Pedro Guevara Memorial National High School
- St. Therese Martin of Lisieux School and Business High School

=== Higher educational institutions ===
- ACTS Computer College
- AMA Computer University
- AMA Computer Learning Center
- Laguna State Polytechnic University
- Laguna University
- Philippine Women's University
- STI College
- Union College of Laguna

== Healthcare ==
=== Hospitals ===
Private Hospitals: 4 Rural Health Units: 2 Government Hospital: 1

Health Centers
26

- Laguna Medical Center
- Santa Cruz Laguna Polymedic, Inc.
- Laguna Doctors Hospital
- Laguna Holy Family Hospital
- Jesus the Saviour Hospital

== Transportation ==
The development of Santa Cruz as the administrative, commercial, and service center of Laguna makes it accessible to all private and public vehicles going to nearby places, particularly Pagsanjan, Lake Caliraya, Liliw, Paete and Nagcarlan.

=== Vehicle ===
- Jeepney
- UV Express
- Tricycle

=== Bus lines ===
- HM Transport
- JAC Liner
- Lucena Lines
- DLTBCo

=== Laguna Province Capital Bus lines ===
- Pascual Liner
- Worthy Transport Inc. (Shuttle)

== Gallery ==
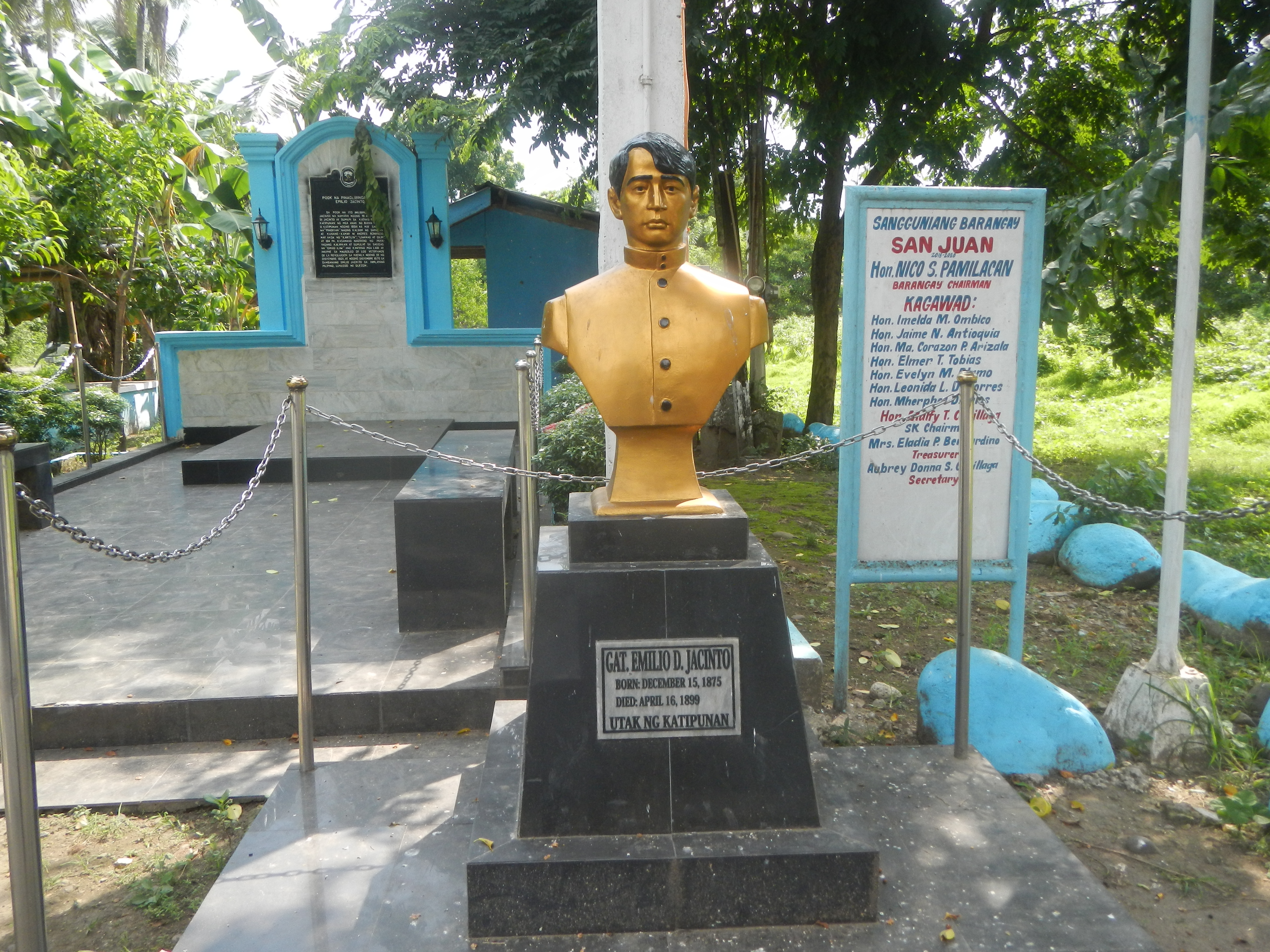
Emilio Jacinto Shrine Burial Site

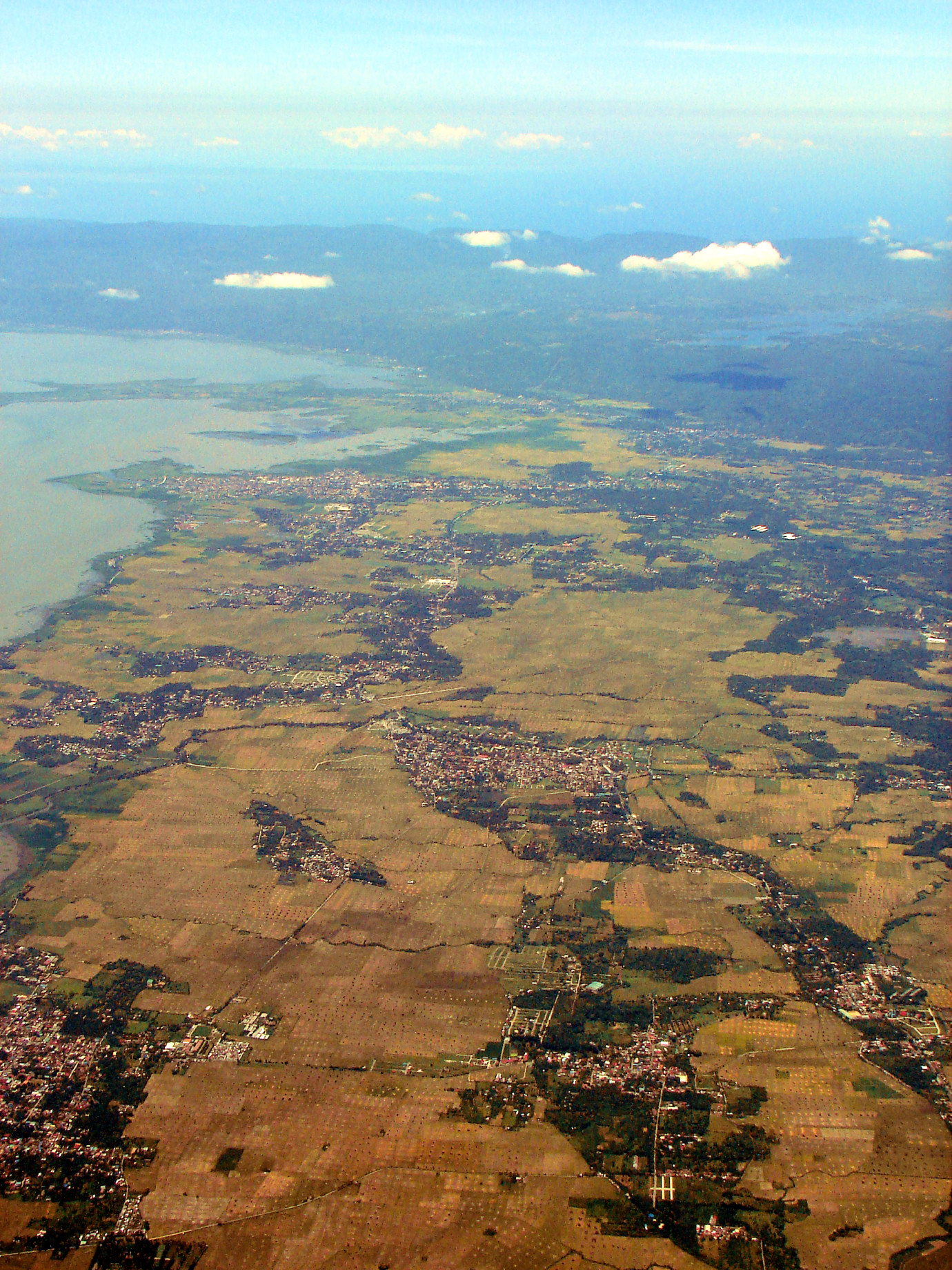
Aerial view with Santa Cruz in the centre and Pila in the foreground

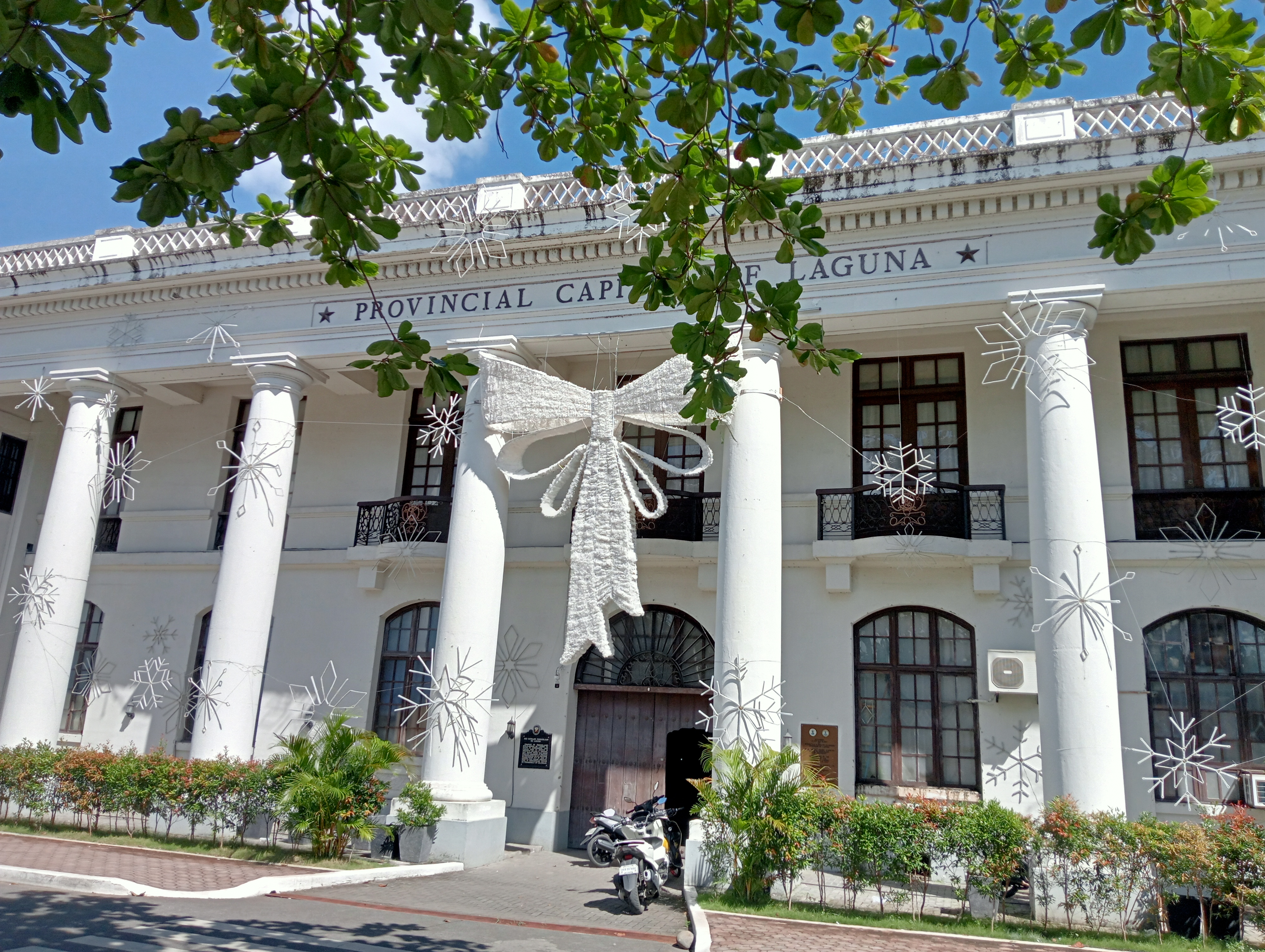
Laguna Provincial Capitol

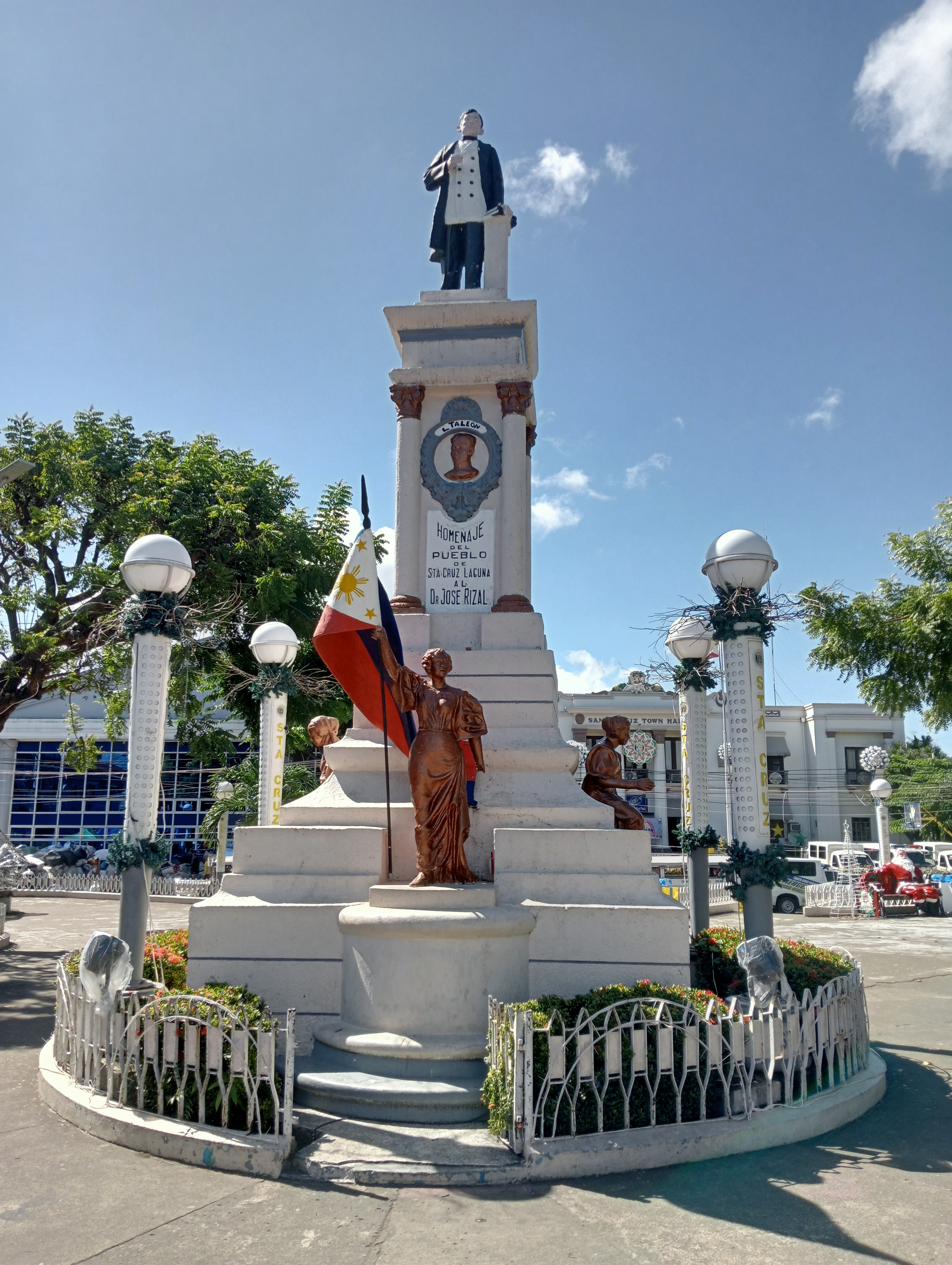
Rizal Monument

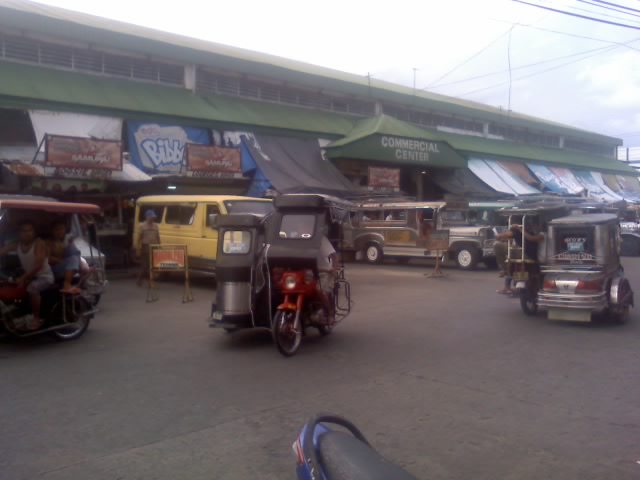
Santa Cruz Public Market viewed from Regidor Street near Santisima Elementary School

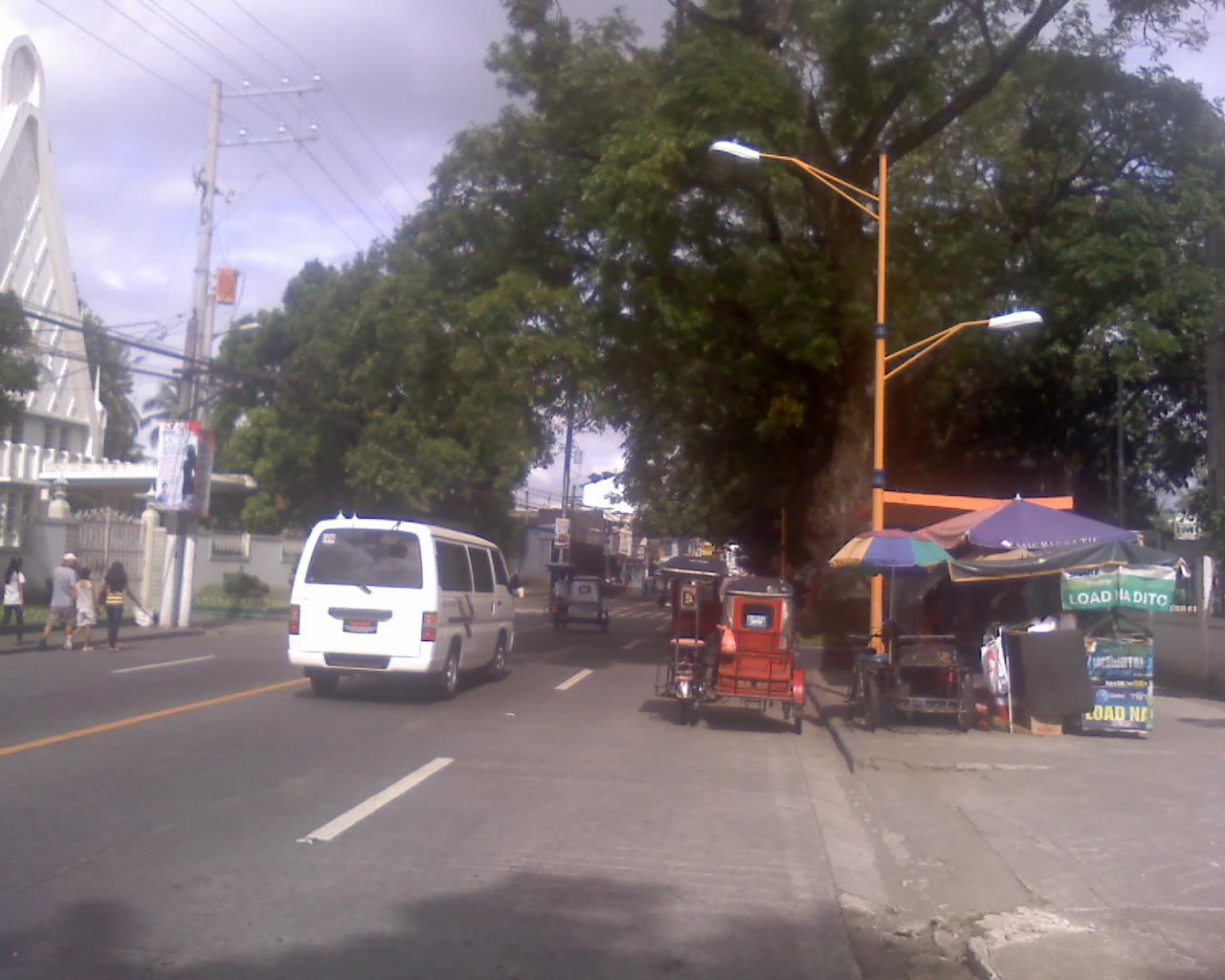
Pedro Guevara Avenue, in front of the Iglesia ni Cristo church

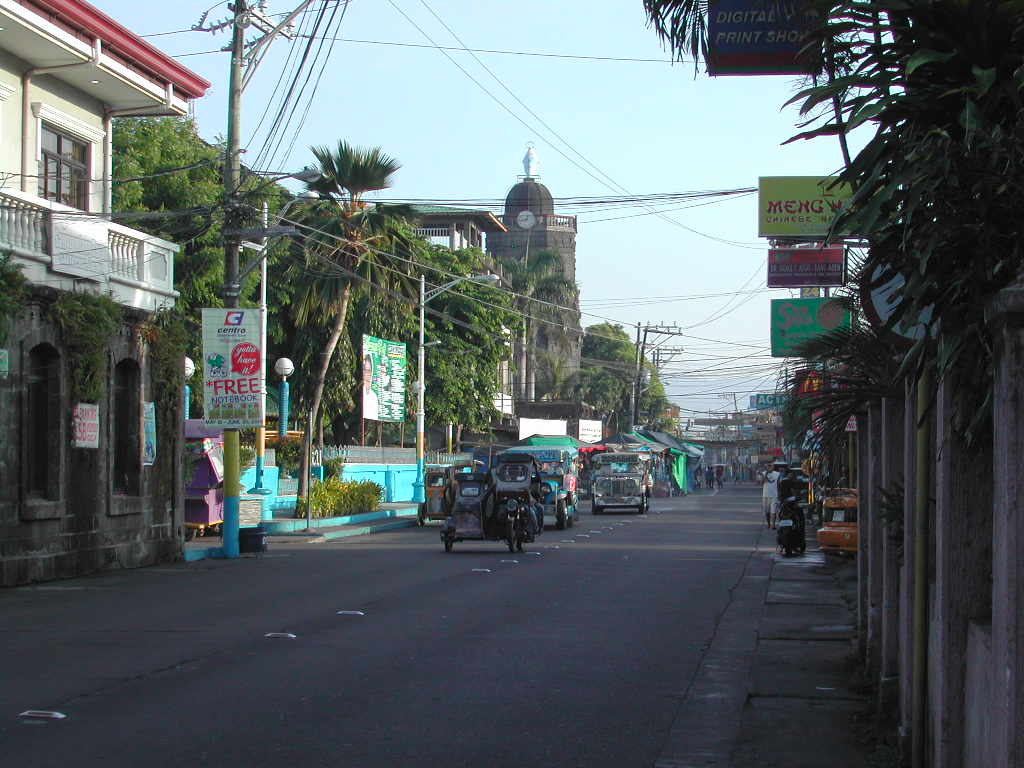
Pedro Guevara Avenue. To the left is the Spanish-era Escuela Pía building. The bell tower of the Church of the Immaculate Conception can be seen at the background.

== Notable people ==
- Gen. Juan Cailles – first Filipino Military Governor of Laguna, teacher, soldier, and public servant
- Gen. Agueda Kahabagan – first Filipino female General of 1st Republic of the Philippines
- Pedro Guevara – soldier, legislator, lawyer and writer
- Rustico de los Reyes Jr. – Member of the Philippine Constitutional Commission of 1986 and former member of the Regular Batasang Pambansa
- Eduardo Quisumbing – National Scientist of the Philippines for Plant Taxonomy, Systematics, and Morphology
- Emil Q. Javier – National Scientist of the Philippines for Agriculture, and 17th President of the University of the Philippines
- Nena Saguil – modernist and abstract art painter
- Socorro Ramos – entrepreneur and co-founder of the Philippine bookstore chain National Book Store
- Carmina Villarroel – actress, TV presenter
- Edgar San Luis – former Mayor (2019–2025) and Representative of the 4th District of Laguna (2007–2013)

== Sister cities ==
- Makati, Philippines

Preceded by Pagsanjan	Capital of Laguna; 1858–present	Incumbent
