= Laguna Santiago Educational Foundation =

Private college in Laguna, Philippines

Coordinates: 14°17′01″N 121°24′52″E

Laguna Santiago Educational Foundation is a college located in Santa Cruz, Laguna, Philippines. It is recognized as a private Higher Education Institution by the Commission on Higher Education.

It was established in 1947 and currently led by Architect Ariel Ting.
