= Union College of Laguna =

Private college in Laguna, Philippines

- Type: Private
- Established: 1947
- Principal: Dr. David A. Sobrepeña
- Location: Santa Cruz, Laguna, Philippines; 14°17′00″N 121°24′57″E
- Website: www.uclaguna.com
- Location in Laguna Location in Luzon Location in the Philippines

The Union College of Laguna is a college institution located in Santa Cruz, Laguna, Philippines. The Union College was founded in 1947 by educator Enrique Sobrepeña whose aim was to provide access to education to students who can't go to Manila for further education.

== Academics and courses ==
The Union College of Laguna is composed of the following Schools:

The Union College School of Integrated Preparatory Studies (UCSIPS) provides a 12-year program that combines kindergarten, elementary, and high school studies to prepare the student for college. This curriculum is not common among the educational institutions in the Philippines. It is currently headed by Mr. Redentor L. Abadier.

The School of Arts and Sciences (SAS) provides the subjects that are required by the Philippine governing entities for education. These subject includes collegiate mathematics, physical education, and the sciences. The SAS also provides specialized studies and grant degrees in BS Psychology, Bachelor of Arts with majors in Political Science, Public Administration, English, and Economics. It is currently headed by Dr. Lito F. Noroña.

The School of Education (SED) is a branch of the College provides the programs for Bachelor of Elementary Education and Bachelor of Secondary Education. It is currently headed by Dr. Rosemarie D. Sabado.

The School of Accountancy, Business Administration, Technology and Hotel and Restaurant Management (SABATH) governs entrepreneurial and technical training. It grants degree and certificate programs for Accountancy, Business Administration, and HRM. The SABATH also gives degrees and certificates for Secretarial Administration, Computer Science, Information Technology, and Computer Engineering. It is currently headed by Dr. Mona Lisa Dabao.

The Graduate School provides courses in Public Administration, and Education with a choice of major in Administration and Supervision, Guidance and Counseling, or Psychology.

== See also ==
- David Sobrepeña, college president 1979
