= Santa Cruz River (Philippines) =

River in Laguna, Philippines

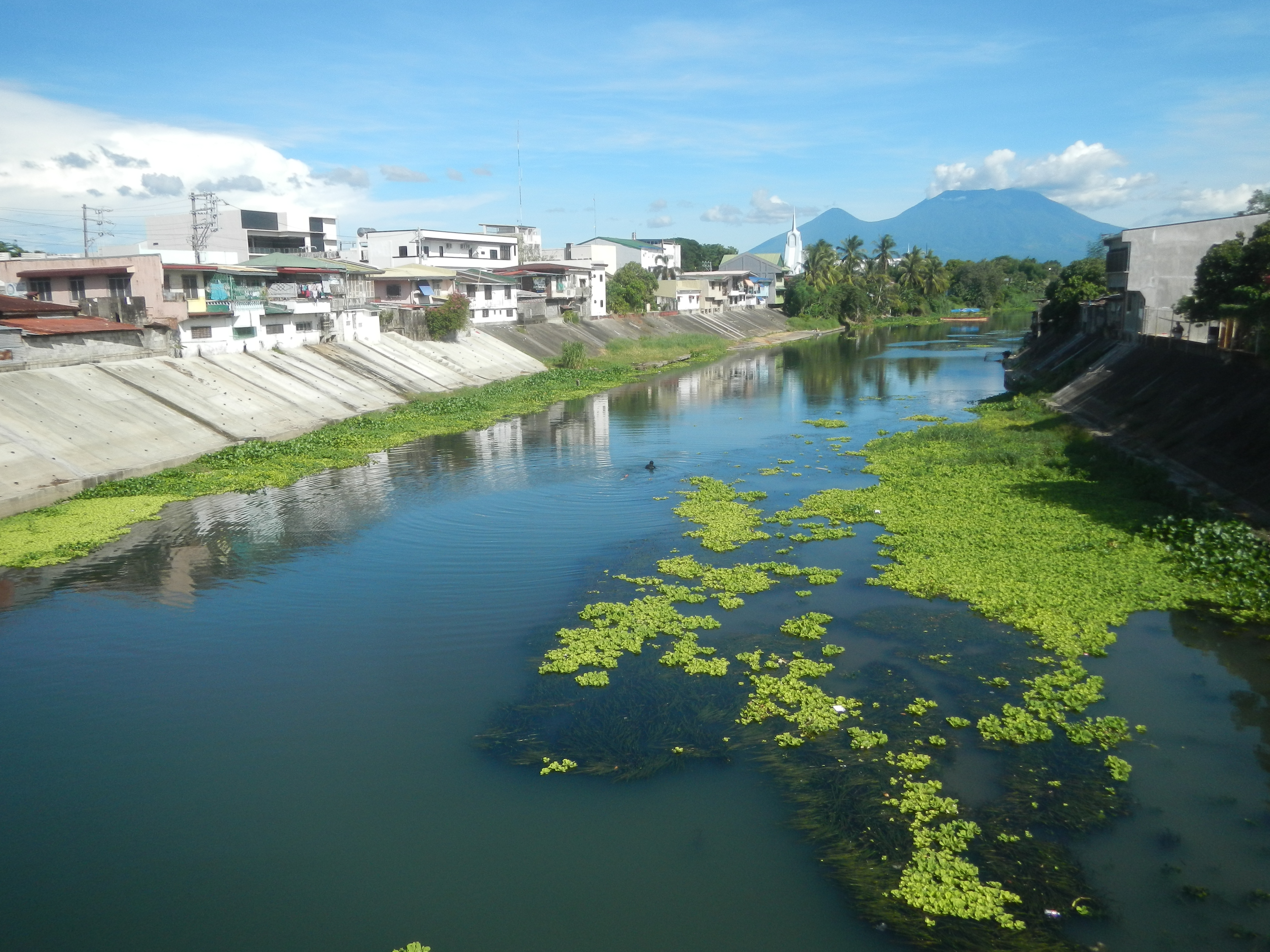
- The river in 2019

- Location within Luzon Location within Philippines

Location
- Country: Philippines
- Region: Calabarzon
- Province: Laguna
- City/municipality: Santa Cruz

Physical characteristics
- Source: Mount Banahaw
- Mouth: eastern shore of Laguna de Bay
  - location: Santa Cruz, Laguna
  - coordinates: 14°18′00″N 121°24′24″E
  - elevation: less than 2 meters (6.6 ft) above sea level

The Santa Cruz River (Tagalog: Ilog ng Santa Cruz) is a river system in Santa Cruz, Laguna, on the island of Luzon, in the Philippines.

It is one of 21 tributaries of Laguna de Bay, contributing about 15% of the total water in the lake. It is thus regularly monitored by the Laguna Lake Development Authority (LLDA) through one of its 15 river monitoring stations.

== Conservation ==
In the latest (December 2005) Water Quality Status Report listed on the Laguna Lake Development Authority's site, the Santa Cruz River was listed as Class D, with high total coliform concentration.

According to the Water Usage & Classification for Fresh Water system used by the Philippines' Department of Environment and Natural Resources, Class D Quality freshwater is suitable for agriculture, irrigation, livestock watering and industrial water supply class II.

It also indicated that this status had been "maintained" since the river was last monitored.

== Agricultural use ==
The Santa Cruz River waters are a source of irrigation water for 2,185 hectares (5,400 acres) of ricefields in Pila, Santa Cruz, Liliw, Victoria and Nagcarlan towns. The provincial capital of Laguna Province was put up on the banks of this river.

On September 28, 2006, Typhoon Xangsane (PAGASA name Typhoon Milenyo) caused the destruction of the Calumpang Diversion Dam in the Municipality of Liliw, which channeled water to irrigation canals around the area. The dam was built in the 1970s. The livelihood of more than 2,300 farmers in five Laguna towns was put at risk. The storm was only the immediate cause of the damage, with continuous quarrying along the Santa Cruz River cited as the primary cause.

The National Irrigation Administration (NIA) said that while the quarry operations were located beyond the dam's 1-kilometre (0.62 mi) radius, the continuous collection of rocks in the lower portion of the area caused erosion in the riverbed. The NIA noted that a survey they conducted before the typhoon showed that the riverbed had dropped by 12 metres (39 ft) because of erosion.

They also estimated that the construction of a new dam would take 11 months to two years to build a new dam depending on the availability of funds. This meant that our farmers might not be able to plant rice for two years prior to the rehabilitation of the dam.

== See also ==
- Laguna de Bay
- Laguna Lake Development Authority
