= Immaculate Conception Parish Church (Santa Cruz) =

Roman Catholic church in Laguna, Philippines

Santa Cruz Church
- Immaculate Conception Parish Church
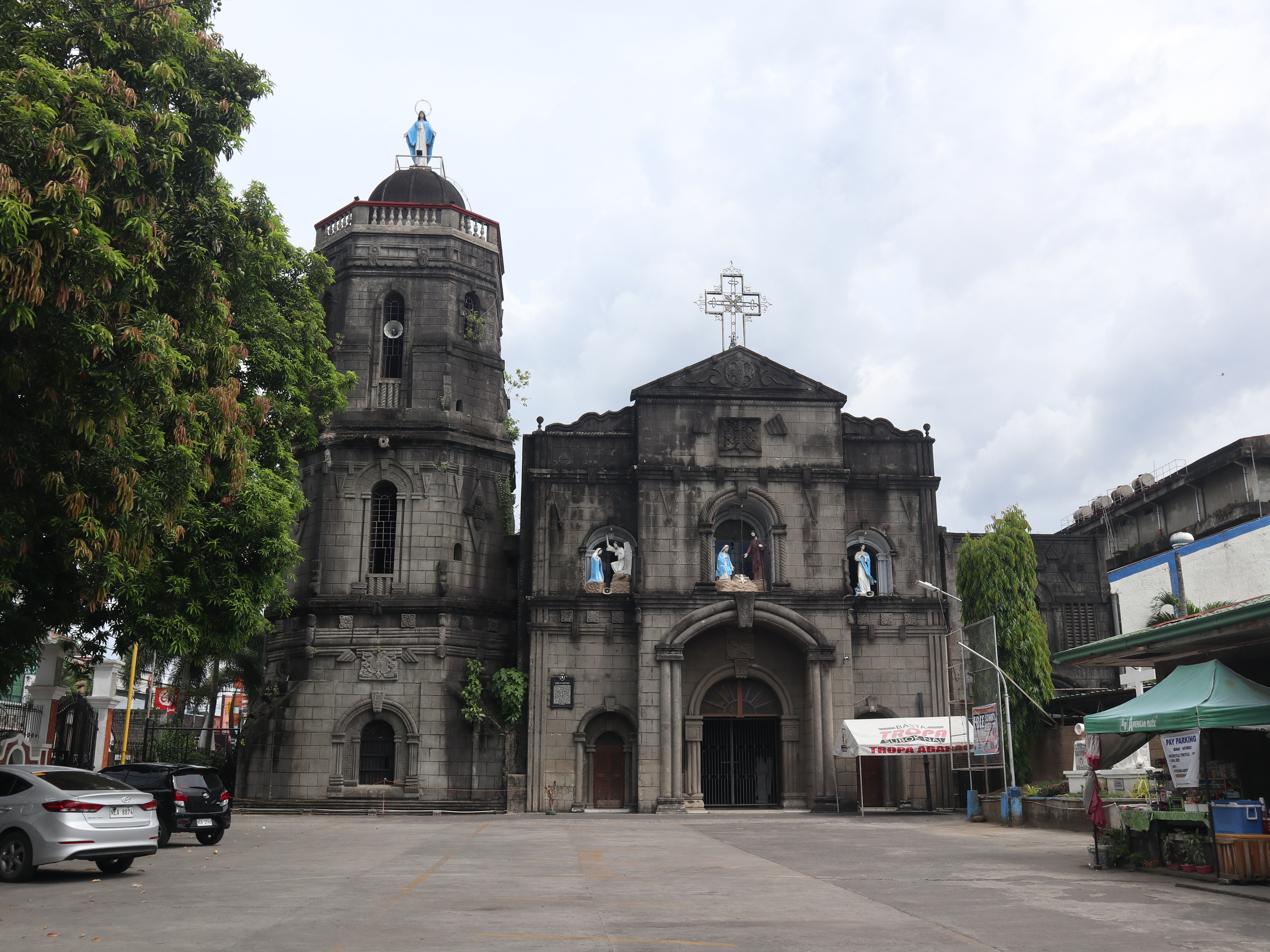
- Church facade in 2023

- Location in Laguna Location in Luzon Location in the Philippines
- 14°16′57″N 121°24′53″E
- Location: Santa Cruz, Laguna
- Country: Philippines
- Denomination: Roman Catholic

History
- Former name: Church of Santa Cruz
- Status: Parish church
- Founded: September 6, 1602
- Dedication: Immaculate Conception

Architecture
- Functional status: Active
- Architect: Antonio Llave
- Architectural type: Church building
- Style: Baroque
- Completed: December 8, 1608

Administration
- Province: Manila
- Metropolis: Manila
- Archdiocese: Manila
- Diocese: San Pablo
- Deanery: San Antonio de Padua

Clergy
- Priest: Joseph dela Rosa

Immaculate Conception Parish Church, commonly known as Santa Cruz Church, is a Roman Catholic church along Pedro Guevarra Street, Poblacion, Santa Cruz, Laguna, Philippines. It is under the jurisdiction of the Diocese of San Pablo.

== History ==
Santa Cruz was formerly annexed (or was a visita) of Lumban and became an independent parish under the advocacy of the Immaculate Conception in 1602 with Gabriel de Castro as priest. Due to sanitary problems in the original location, the church was transferred in 1608 in its present location and built the present church under the direction of Antonio de la Llave. Miguel Perciva added a transept under his direction in 1672. The church was later renovated by building a nave, convent and remodeling of the five altars by Juan Marzon in 1850. The church was destroyed by fire on January 28, 1945, during the Liberation. It was reconstructed in 1948 under Mariano Limjuco.

Besides the devotion to the Virgin Mary, an image of the Holy Guardian Angel, whose devotion started in 1678 by Fernando de la Concepcion, was venerated in Santa Cruz. After being housed at Pila, the infirmary of the Franciscan religious was transferred to Pila on July 13, 1674.

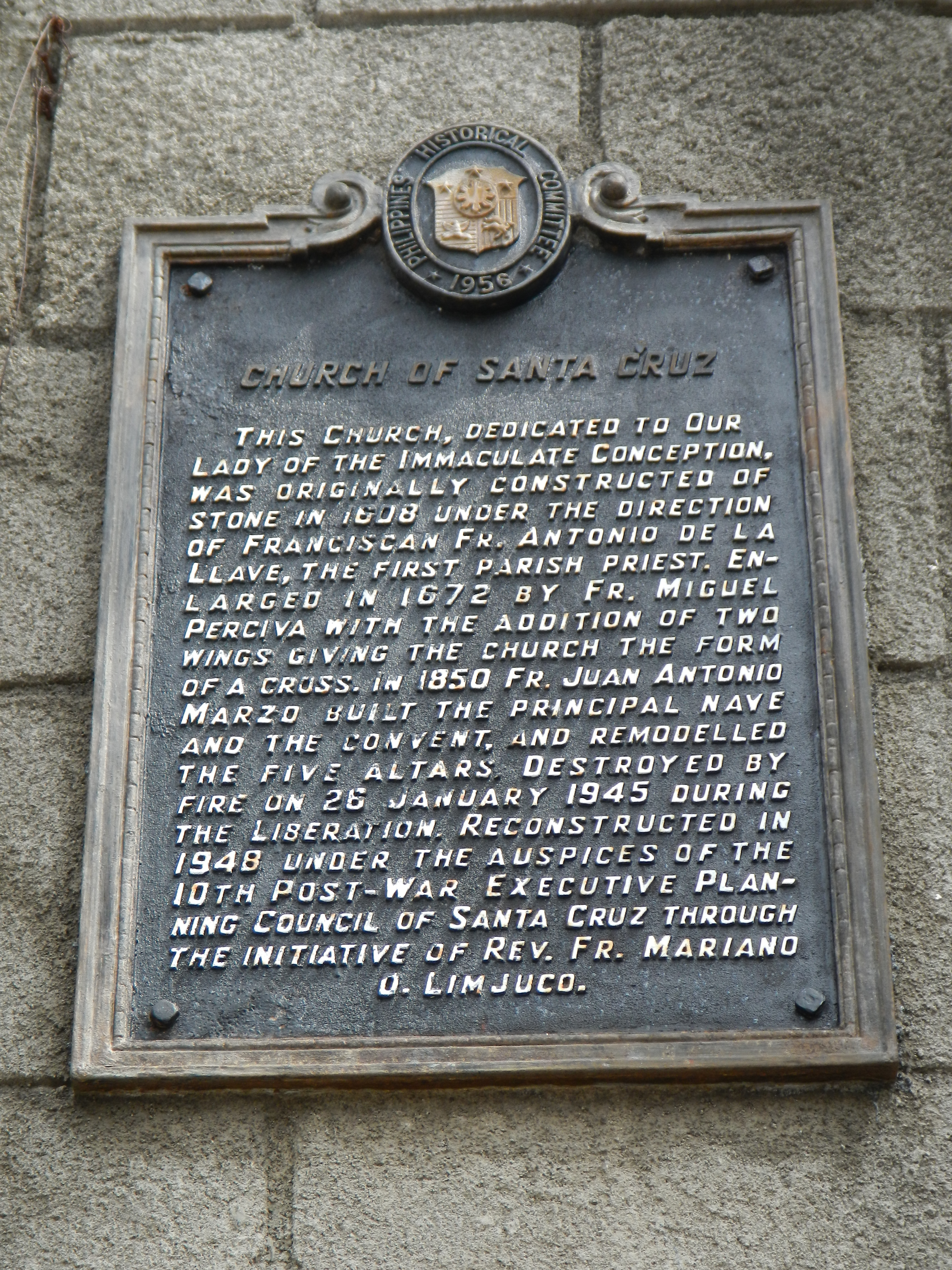
Church PHC historical marker installed in 1956

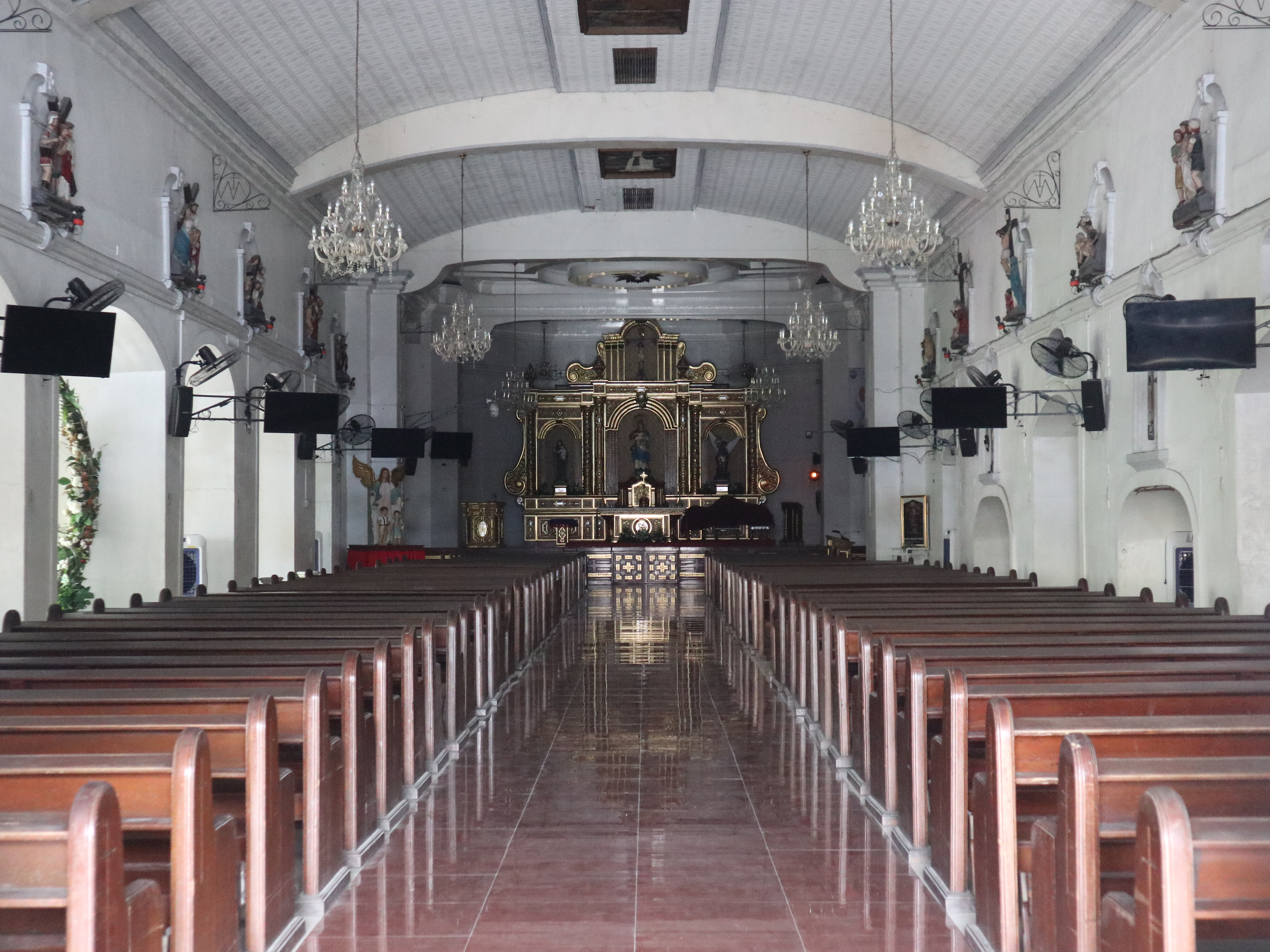
Church interior in 2023

== Bibliography ==
- Huerta, Felix de (1865). Estado geográfico, topográfico, estadístico, histórico-religioso [Geographical, topographical, statistical, historical and religious state] (in Spanish). Binondo: Imprenta de M. Sanchez y Ca.
- Historical Markers: Regions I-IV and CAR (in Filipino). Manila: National Historical Institute (Philippines). 1993. p. 88. ISBN 9715380611.
