= David Sobrepeña =

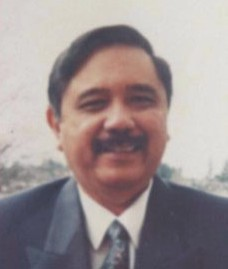
Dr. David A. Sobrepeña

David Sobrepeña (born November 25, 1932) is president of the Union College of Laguna. He was born to Bishop Enrique Sobrepeña and Petra Sobrepeña (née Aguinaldo). He is a native of La Union, a northern province in the Philippines. He succeeded his mother as president of the Union College; she occupied the position upon the demise of his father, the College founder.

== Education and early career ==
He attended Silliman University, received his A.B from the Union College of Laguna in 1952). He then received a Master's in Divinity from Union Theological Seminary for Theological Studies (1952), Hartford Seminary Foundation in Connecticut in 1955, a Master’s in Higher Education from the University of Michigan in 1968, and a PhD in Economics of Education from the same university in 1971.

During his career, he was a Youth Director for the Philippine Federation of Christian Churches (1952–1962), General Secretary for the Student Christian Movement (1962–1965), Chaplain at the Philippine Christian College (now known as the Philippine Christian University) (1955–1966), Administrative Pastor at the National City United Church in Quezon City (1972). During most of this time. he also served as Protestant Chaplain at the Diliman Campus of the University of the Philippines and Pastor at the Church of the Risen Lord at the same campus (1955–1966). From 1988 to 2000, he was Senior Minister of the Bishop Sobrepeña Memorial Church, which is also known as Union College Christian Community (UCCC)

== Presidency of the College ==
On November 2, 1979, he became President of the Union College of Laguna.

During his tenure, the College established the Work Scholarship program, a School of Integrated Preparatory Studies, and the Global Careers Center. It also undertook major renovations and expansion projects including a new College chapel. In 2004, the College was accredited by the Philippine Association of Christian Universities Commission on Accreditation (PACUCOA).
