= Pascual Liner =

Philippine bus company

Pascual Liner Inc.
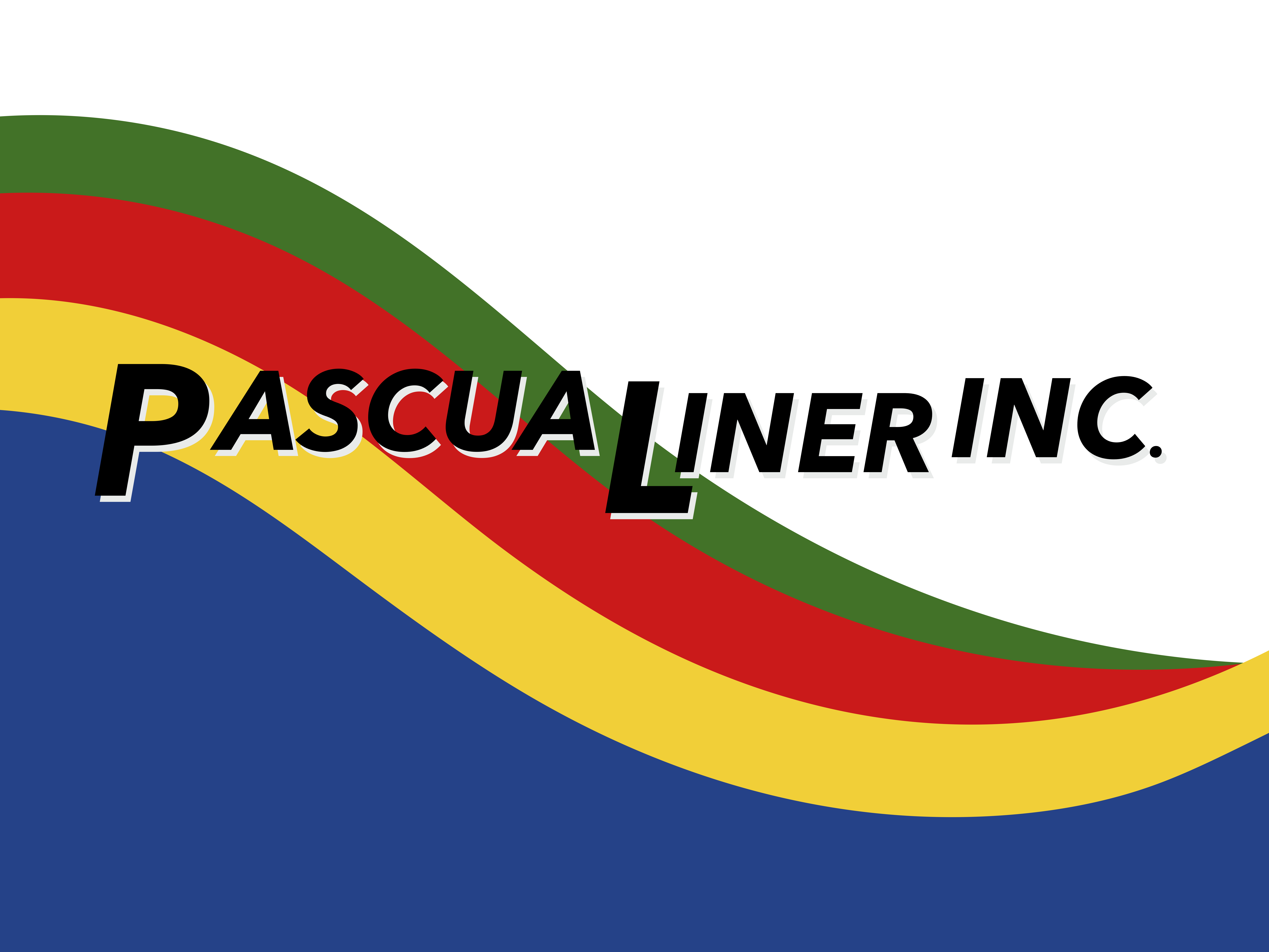
- 2020 Logo

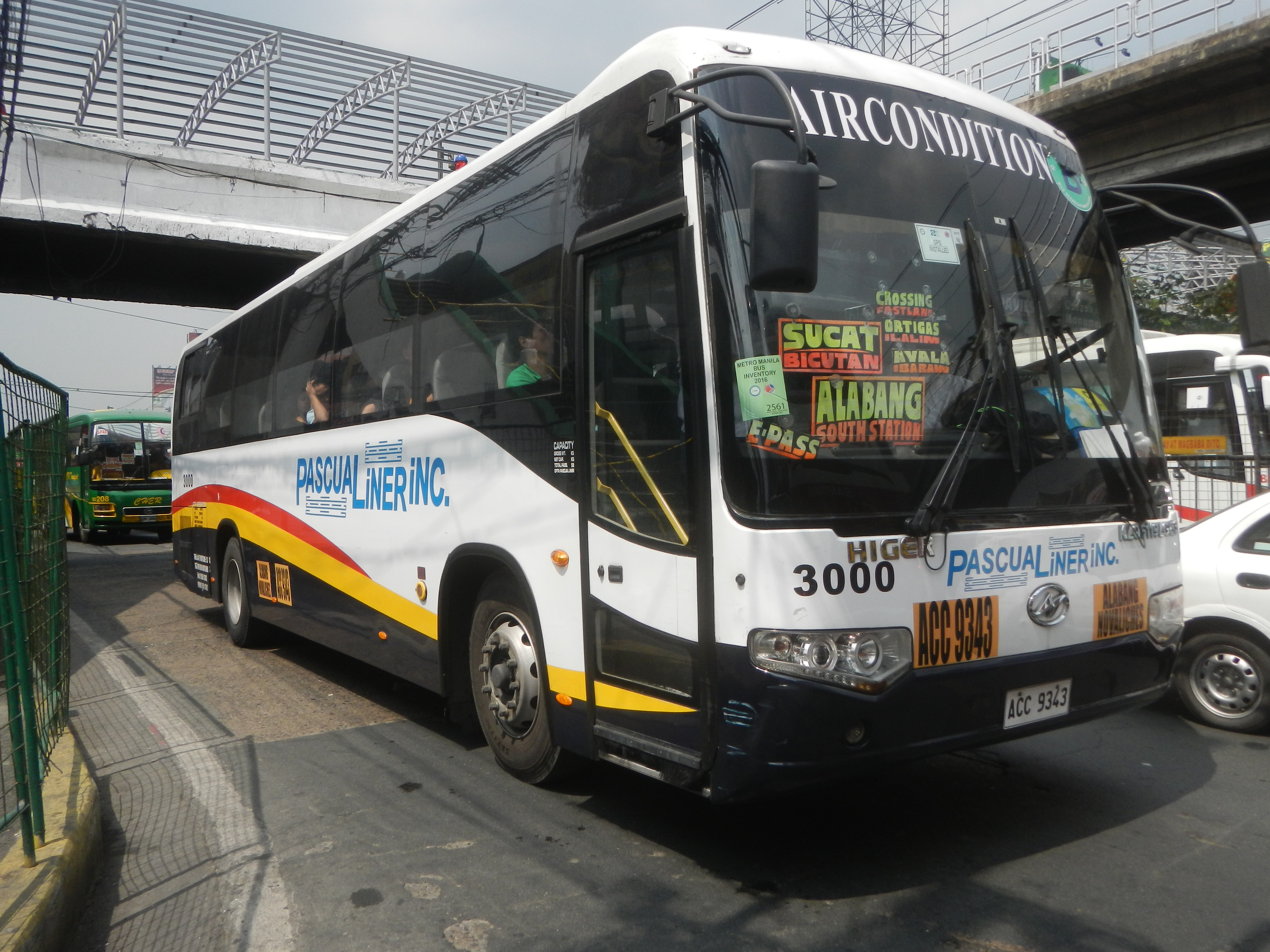
- Founded: 1963; 63 years ago
- Headquarters: Quirino Highway, Gulod, Novaliches, Quezon City, Philippines
- Service area: Metro Manila
- Service type: City operation
- Routes: Alabang - Novaliches via EDSA; EDSA Carousel; North EDSA – Fairview
- Destinations: Alabang, Muntinlupa; Novaliches, Quezon City; Western Bicutan, Taguig, Pacita Complex, Main San Pedro, Laguna; Santa Cruz, Laguna HM Transport Terminal Bus
- Fleet: 50+ Buses (Ankai, Daewoo, Higer, Hino, Isuzu, Jinbei, King Long)
- Operator: Pascual Liner Inc.

Pascual Liner, Inc. (abbreviated as PLI) is a city operation transport company headquartered in Quirino Highway, Gulod, Novaliches, Quezon City, servicing in Metro Manila. It plies routes from Alabang, Muntinlupa to Novaliches, Quezon City. Pascual Liner also operates HM Transport's BGC - Alabang Services, along with Worthy Transport.

== Etymology ==
The bus company is derived from the founders of the company – the Pascual clan – who managed the business until the present time.

== History ==
Pascual Liner Inc. was formed out of the talents, resources and efforts of its founder, the late Mr. Manuel F. Pascual, Sr., his late wife Mrs. Juana P. Pascual with their five children who all worked toward the success of the company.

Pascual Liner Inc. was organized in 1963 with its office and garage located in Baesa, Quezon City with an area of 5,000 square meters. The company then, only had 12 Ford commuter buses, which were financed by Ford Phils. Routing from Novaliches, Quezon City to Baclaran, Parañaque via EDSA. In the years that followed, the company also acquired several commuter buses from International Harvester Phils. (IH Phils.) and Isuzu Phils. the former, financed by Rizal Commercial Banking Corp. and the latter, financed by the Development Bank of the Philippines.

In 1977, Pascual Liner, Inc. moved to a bigger office and garage in Novaliches, Quezon City with an estimated 11,000 square meters lot area, which were more than enough to accommodate the expansion plans of the company. Since then, the company has considered Novaliches, Quezon City as its "home".

In the next years, Pascual Liner, Inc. continuously expanded and purchased commuter buses to local bus manufacturers and even imported buses from Japan and Singapore. In the early 1990s, the company acquired from Hino Philippines 90 units of aircon commuter buses. It was during this time that Pascual Liner, Inc. became the biggest transport company in Metro Manila with more than 200 commuter buses in its fleet and 900 employees, routing from Novaliches, Quezon City to Alabang, Muntinlupa.

Pascual Liner, Inc. is considered as one of the contributing factors to the success of Novaliches. For more than 40 years, it has brought people from their home to their workplace and vice versa.

In 1997, Mr. Manuel F. Pascual, Sr., founder and President of Pascual Liner, Inc. died but his legacy lives on and the company continues to provide transportation to people through the management of his five children namely: Rodolfo P. Pascual, Sr., Erlinda Pascual-Soriano, Rolando P. Pascual, Emiliana Pascual-Bautista and Manuel P. Pascual, Jr.

== Fleet ==
Pascual Liner Inc. utilizes and maintains Ankai, Daewoo, Higer, and Golden Dragon units.

Units

Ankai

- HK6103H2
- HFC6108H (HM Transport Operated)

Daewoo

- GDW6119H2 (HM Transport Operated)
- BS106 Royal City (HM Transport Operated)

Dongfeng

- EQ6100K

Higer

- V90 KLQ6109E3/4
- V91 KLQ6119LGE3
- B92H KLQ6129G (EDSA Carousel)

Golden Dragon

- XML6102Splendor

Pascual also formerly operated ordinary buses made by Hino, Isuzu, and Jinbei.

== Gallery ==
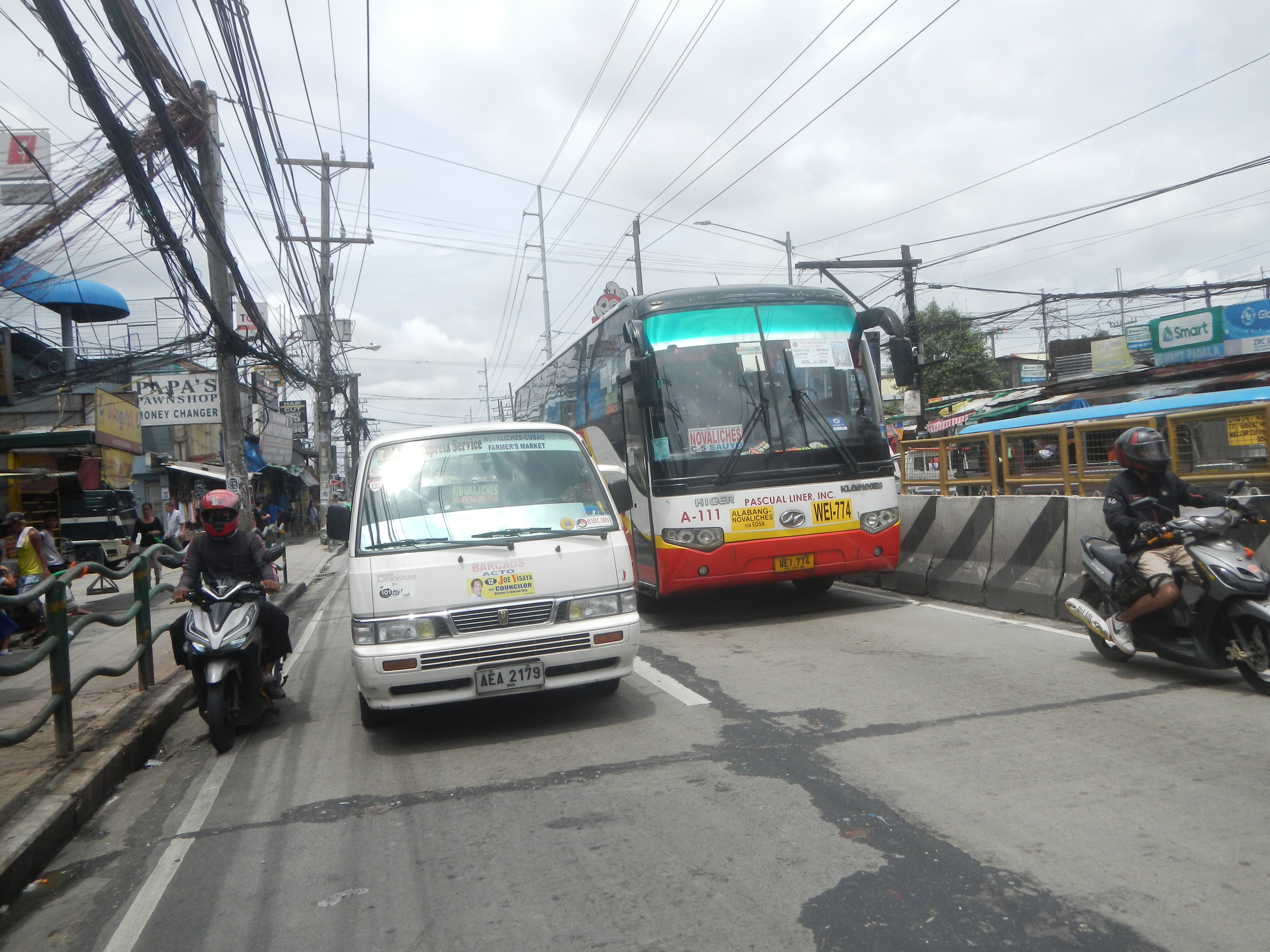
Pascual Liner KLQ6109E3 operated by HM Transport

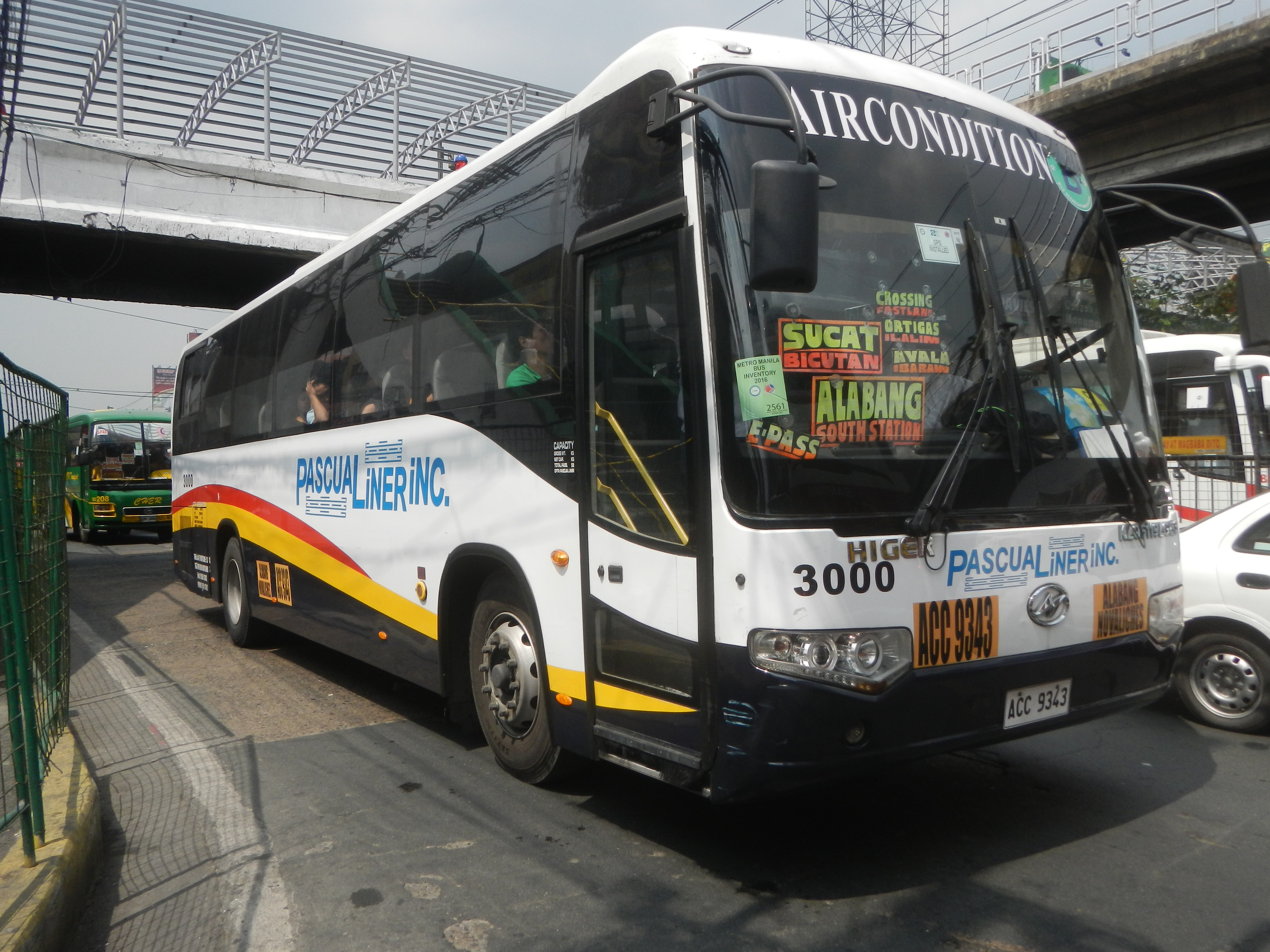
Pascual Liner KLQ6119LGE3 in EDSA

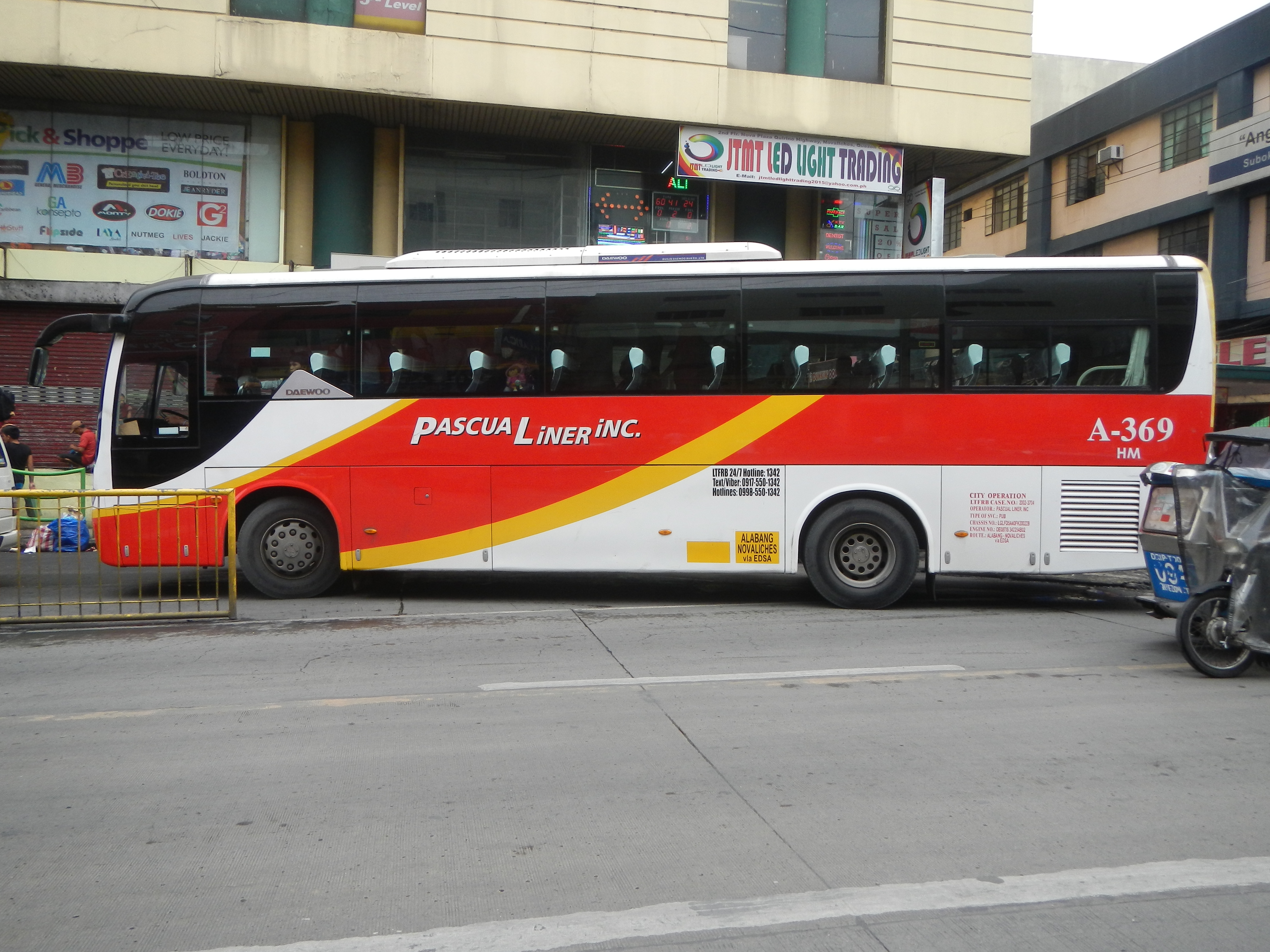
Pascual Liner GDW6119H2 operated by HM Transport

== See also ==
- List of bus companies of the Philippines
