= Tube (passenger information system) =

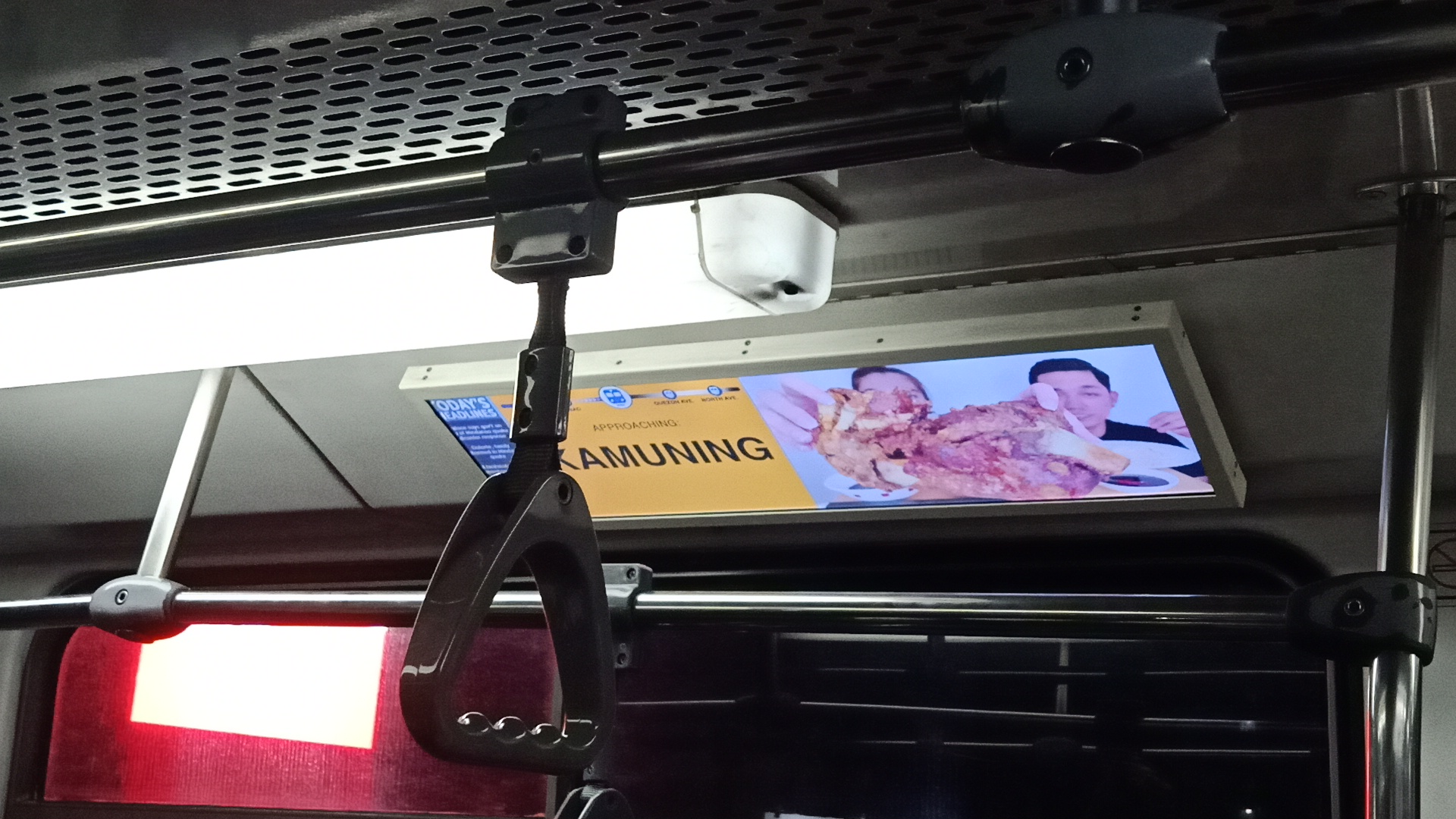
A TUBE LCD monitor screen inside a Line 3 train.

Tube (stylized TUBE), formerly called the Passenger Assist Railway Display System (PARDS), was a passenger information system that has been deployed on certain lines of the Manila Light Rail Transit (LRT) and Metro Rail Transit (MRT) systems. Developed by Filipino technology companies TrackMate Business Solutions and PHAR Philippines, the system was initially unveiled on May 5, 2017.

== History ==
=== Initial deployment, as PARDS ===
PARDS was created amid feedback from train passengers that they are unaware of what's going on while riding the system, with a lack of information displays among their major complaints.

The system was unveiled on May 5, 2017, with the system being installed on one Line 2 train. By June 2017, all ten active train units were fitted with the system, with some 400 LCD monitors installed system-wide. Installed at no cost to the national government, PARDS is funded through advertising.

Although initially deployed on the Line 2, TrackMate also presented the system to the Light Rail Manila Corporation, the operator of Line 1, and to the Metro Rail Transit Corporation, operator of Line 3, eliciting a positive reaction. TrackMate also claimed that there is interest in deploying PARDS internationally, as well as that there is potential in deploying it as a suitable low-cost alternative to traditional railway signalling systems.

=== As TUBE ===
On March 28, 2019, an event was held announcing the system's rebranding to TUBE. In contrast to PARDS, TUBE features a redesigned interface and advertisements, and during the event, Filipino YouTube personalities presented how the companies aimed to deploy the system to all three lines. PHAR and TrackMate have announced that Line 3 trains will be equipped with the system by April 2019, with the goal of having the system deployed on all three lines by July.

=== Demise ===
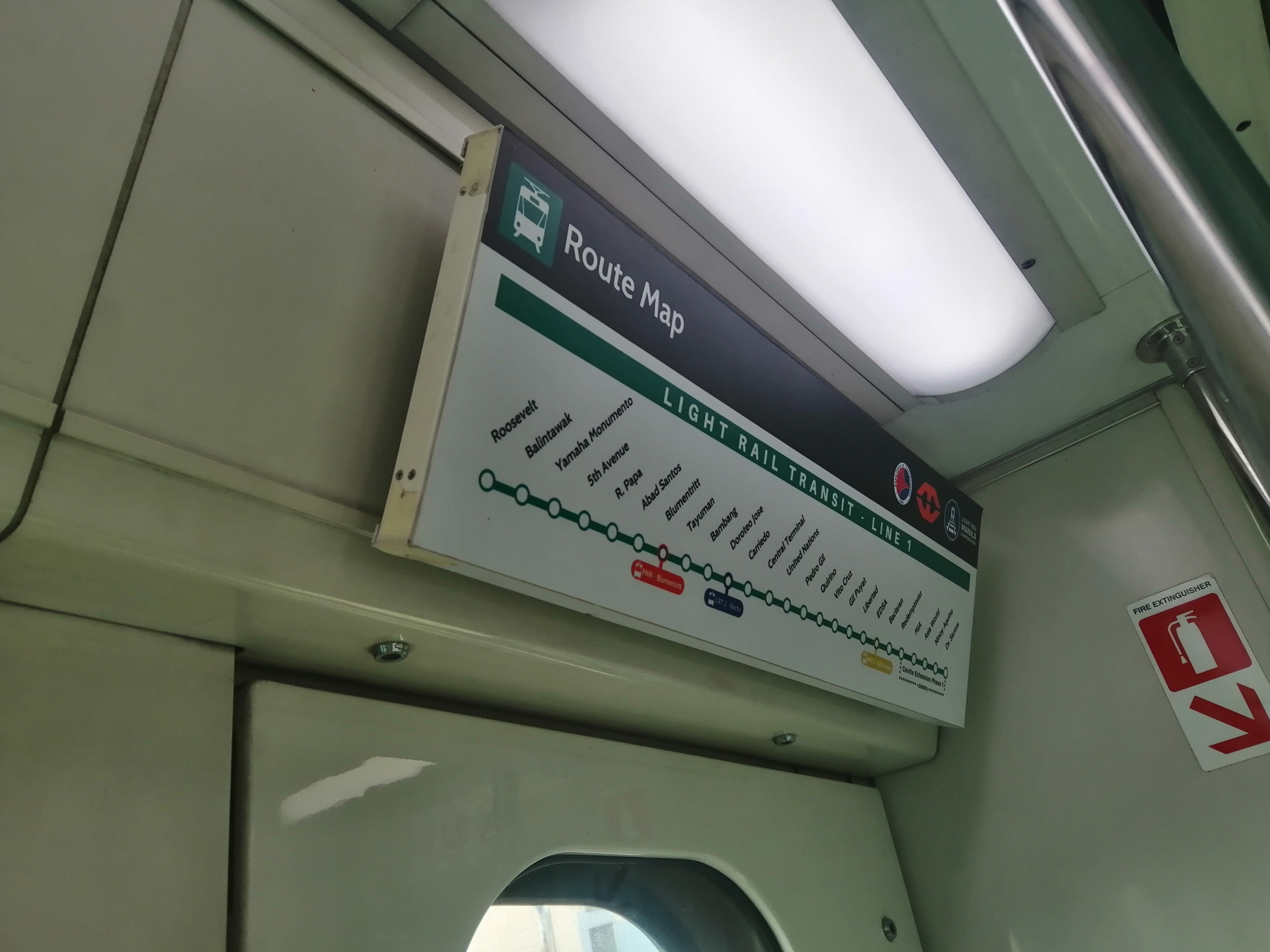
The former TUBE LCD screens, now covered with the route map of Line 1

However, by 2023, all TUBE screens had been switched off and no longer in use, with some screens found in the LRTA 1200 class of LRT Line 1 being covered up with the route map prior to the opening of the Cavite Extension Phase 1 and subsequently removed.

== Technology ==
TUBE uses GPS technology to determine a train's speed, location and other important information, which helps determine a train's arrival and departure time. Information from the train is uploaded to the cloud, which is then transmitted back to the train.

Each TUBE-equipped train has been fitted with at least 40 LCD monitors which not only shows the train's location, but also news, public service announcements, passenger traffic and entertainment. The system is also capable of transmitting real-time information when circumstances require, such as in an emergency.

TUBE also has a mobile component, where real-time train information can be accessed through a mobile application to be developed as part of the project's second phase, as well as a backend which allows the Light Rail Transit Authority to monitor train performance and passenger loads in real time.
