= LRTA 1200 class =

3rd-generation rolling stock operating at LRT-1

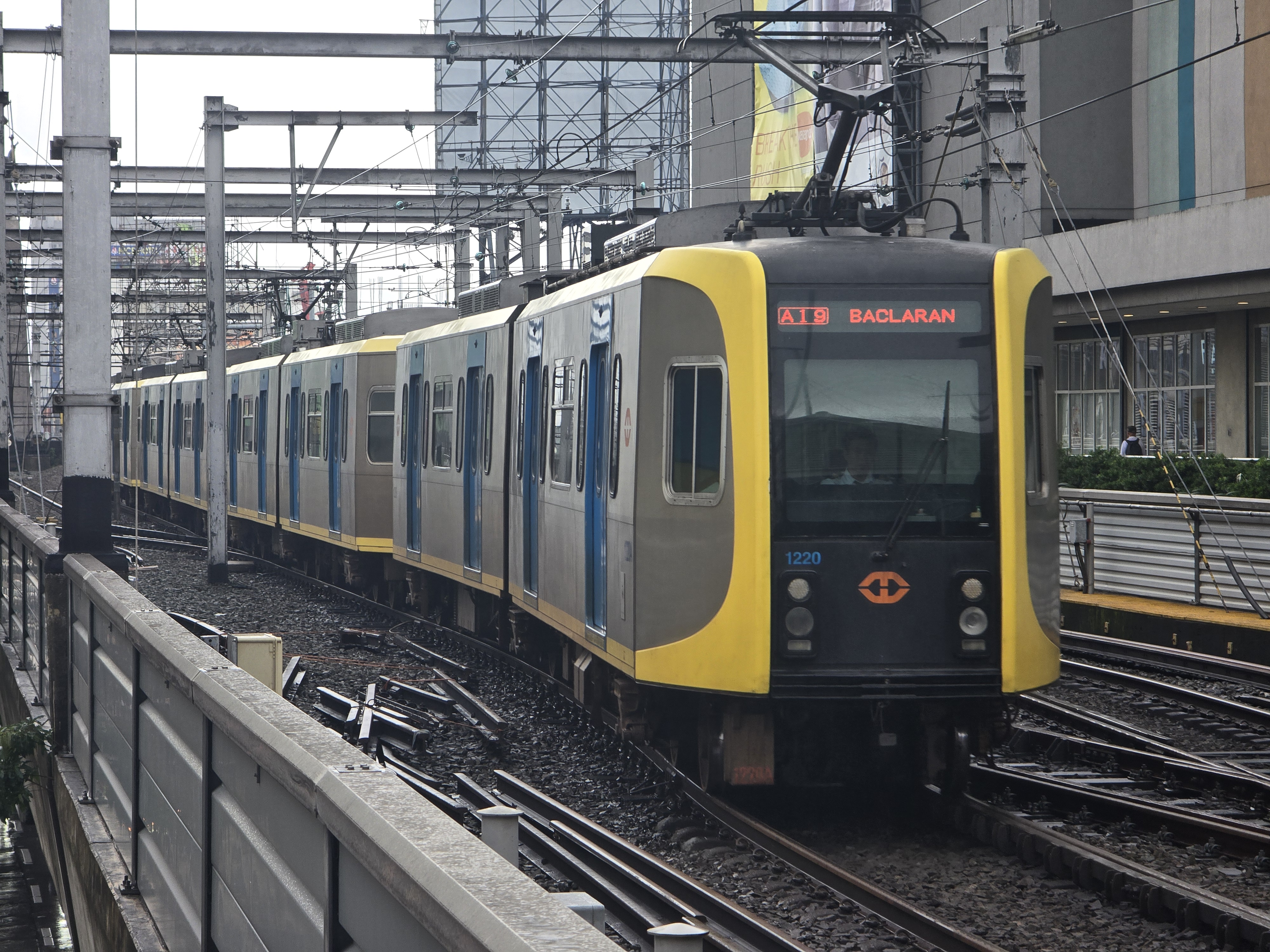
- A 1200 class train near Monumento station in July 2025

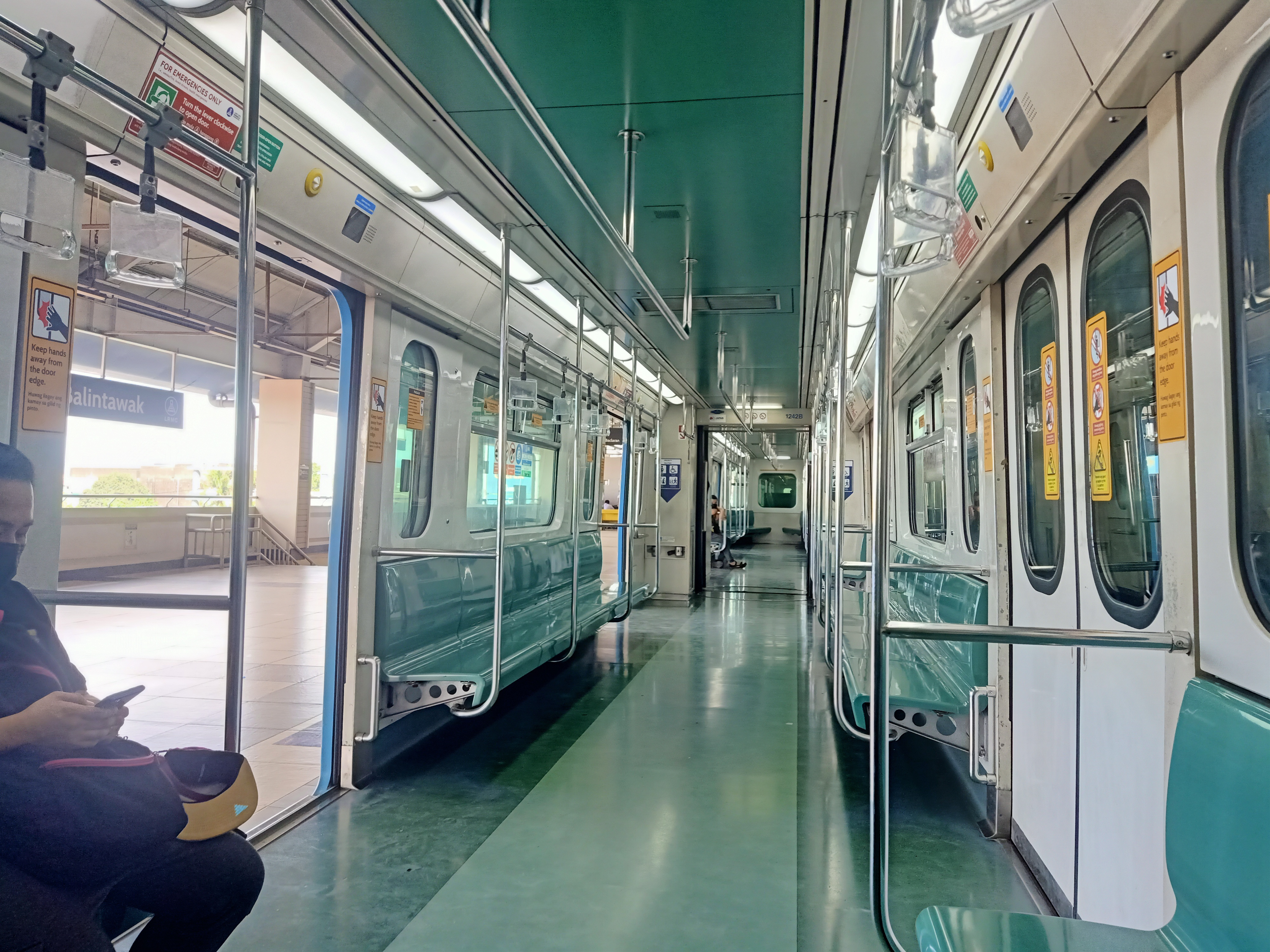
- Train interior in February 2022
- Stock type: Light rail vehicle
- In service: 2006–present
- Manufacturers: Kinki Sharyo and Nippon Sharyo
- Assembly: Osaka (Kinki Sharyo) and Toyokawa, Aichi (Nippon Sharyo), Japan
- Constructed: 2005–2006
- Entered service: December 11, 2006; 19 years ago
- Number built: 48 vehicles (12 sets)
- Number in service: 44 vehicles (11 sets)
- Formation: 4 cars per trainset (Mc–M–M–Mc)
- Fleet numbers: 1201–1248
- Capacity: 1,388 per train (272 seats)
- Operators: LRTA (2007–2015); LRMC (2015–present)
- Depot: Baclaran
- Line served: Line 1

Specifications
- Car body construction: Stainless steel
- Train length: 105.7 m (346 ft 9 27/64 in)
- Car length: 26.35 m (86 ft 5 13/32 in) (Mc); 26.5 m (86 ft 11 5/16 in) (M)
- Width: 2.59 m (8 ft 5 31/32 in)
- Height: 3.91 m (12 ft 9 15/16 in)
- Floor height: 0.92 m (3 ft 7/32 in)
- Platform height: 0.69 m (2 ft 3 11/64 in)
- Doors: Double-leaf pocket-type; 4 per side 1.5 m × 1.9 m (59 in × 75 in)
- Articulated sections: 2
- Wheel diameter: 660–600 mm (26–24 in) (new–worn)
- Wheelbase: 1.9 m (74 13/16 in)
- Maximum speed: 60 km/h (37 mph)
- Weight: 37.4 t (82,000 lb) (Mc); 36.5 t (80,000 lb) (M)
- Axle load: 10.3 t (23,000 lb)
- Steep gradient: 4%
- Traction system: Mitsubishi Electric IGBT–VVVF inverter
- Traction motors: 4 × 105 kW (141 hp) 3-phase AC induction
- Power output: 420 kW (563 hp) per LRV; 1.68 MW (2,253 hp) (4 cars)
- Transmission: Two-stage reduction drive
- Acceleration: 1.1 m/s^{2} (2.46 mph/s)
- Deceleration: 1.3 m/s^{2} (2.91 mph/s)
- Auxiliaries: 440 V AC IGBT static inverter 110 V DC batteries
- HVAC: Roof-mounted duct-type air conditioning
- Electric systems: 750 V DC overhead catenary
- Current collection: Single-arm pantograph
- UIC classification: Bo′+2′+Bo′
- Bogies: Inside-frame type
- Minimum turning radius: 25 m (82 ft 0 in)
- Braking systems: Knorr-Bremse regenerative and electro-pneumatic
- Safety systems: Siemens fixed block ATP/ATS (2007–2022); Alstom Atlas 100 ETCS-1 with subsystem of ATP (2022–present)
- Coupling system: Semi-permanent
- Track gauge: 1,435 mm (4 ft 8 1/2 in) standard gauge

Notes/references
- Sourced from unless otherwise noted.

The LRTA 1200 class is the third-generation class of high-floor light rail vehicles (LRV) of Manila's LRT Line 1, built by Kinki Sharyo and Nippon Sharyo. Purchased as part of the second phase of the capacity expansion of the line, the trains entered service in December 2006.

== History ==
=== Background and purchase ===
With the completion of the initial capacity expansion of the LRT Line 1, its capacity was raised by half with the introduction of seven four-car trains and the upgrading of the existing two-car trains to three cars in 1999. However, its capacity was expected to become insufficient once the railway network in Metro Manila was completed in 2004 with the full opening of the LRT Line 2.

On April 7, 2000, the Japan Bank for International Cooperation (JBIC) extended a ₱8.893 billion loan to finance the second phase of the capacity expansion project. While existing rolling stock were refurbished, twelve more four-car trains were purchased, in conjunction with other upgrades in signaling, telecommunications, and existing railway tracks as well as upgrades at stations and the depot.

Two firms bidded for the project: Kanematsu and Kawasaki Steel Corporation, and the joint venture of Sumitomo Corporation and Itochu. Marubeni was disqualified from the bidding but questioned the technicalities of the bidding procedure. However, delays were encountered in the bidding process, with senator Francisco Tatad claiming on March 21, 2004, that "unconfirmed reports" reaching him disclosed that groups identifying themselves with the President of the Philippines (Gloria Macapagal Arroyo at the time) attempted to extort US$1 million from each bidder supposedly as campaign funds for the May 2004 elections. This, according to Tatad, limited the bidders to the two aforementioned firms. His claims were denied by LRTA administrator Pacifico Fajardo, as well as the Department of Transportation and Communications (DOTC; precursor to the DOTr). Fajardo later claimed that JBIC posed "no objection" to the bidding, and said that it was conducted with transparency.

After a delay of more than three years since 2001, Sumitomo and Itochu won the contract and was given the go-ahead in March 2005. Following this, they signed a construction contract with Kinki Sharyo and Nippon Sharyo to manufacture the light rail vehicles.

=== Production and commissioning ===
In December 2005, officials from the Light Rail Transit Authority and Manila Tren Consortium—the project consultant of the capacity expansion project, inspected the full-scale mock-up model at Kinki Sharyo's factory in Osaka. It was then displayed at the line's depot in Baclaran in March 2006.

After delivery in the third quarter of 2006, the third-generation trains underwent mainline test runs in the late evening, during non-operating hours. Some scheduled tests in late September 2006 were cancelled due to Typhoon Xangsane.

On December 9, 2006, at a ceremony in Baclaran, Japanese Prime Minister Shinzo Abe and President Gloria Macapagal Arroyo inaugurated the third-generation 1200 class trains. These were then deployed for revenue operations two days later. The trains raised the line's capacity from 27,000 passengers per hour per direction to 40,000 passengers per hour per direction.

=== Themed trains ===
On September 6, 2018, a 3G trainset was decorated with a special Gabay Guro decoration to celebrate the National Teachers' Month in the Philippines. The decoration has a library-themed look with images of books. The special themed train was launched on that date and ended a year later.

== Design ==
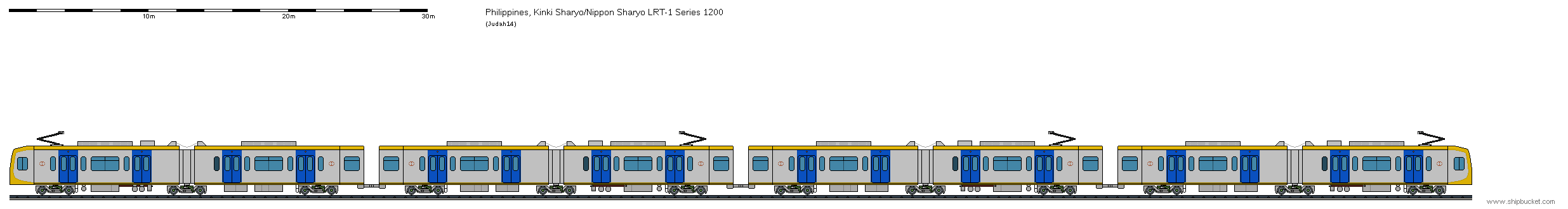
A scale model drawing of the LRTA 1200 class in a 4-car formation

Like the 1100 class, the 1200 class shares the 6-axle rigid body LRV design consisting of two articulated cars.

=== Car body ===
The train car body is made of beadless lightweight stainless steel, with composite materials on the indoor panels and aluminum on the inner bone to reduce weight.

Each light rail vehicle has two roof-mounted air-conditioning units that has a cooling capacity of 41,000 kilocalories (170,000 kilojoules). In total, there are eight air-conditioning units in a four-car train set.

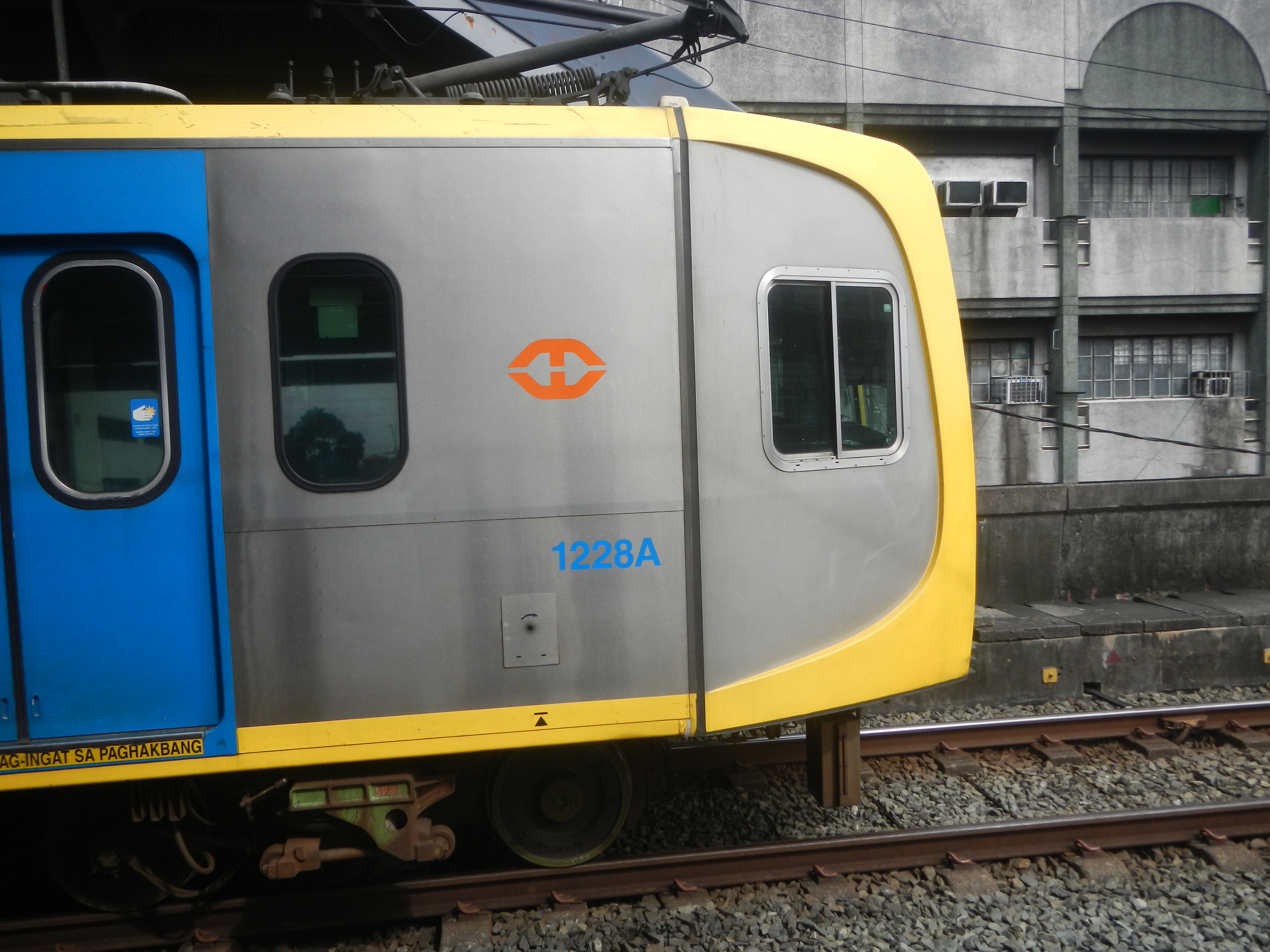
A 1200 class train (front cab) at 5th Avenue station in October 2016.

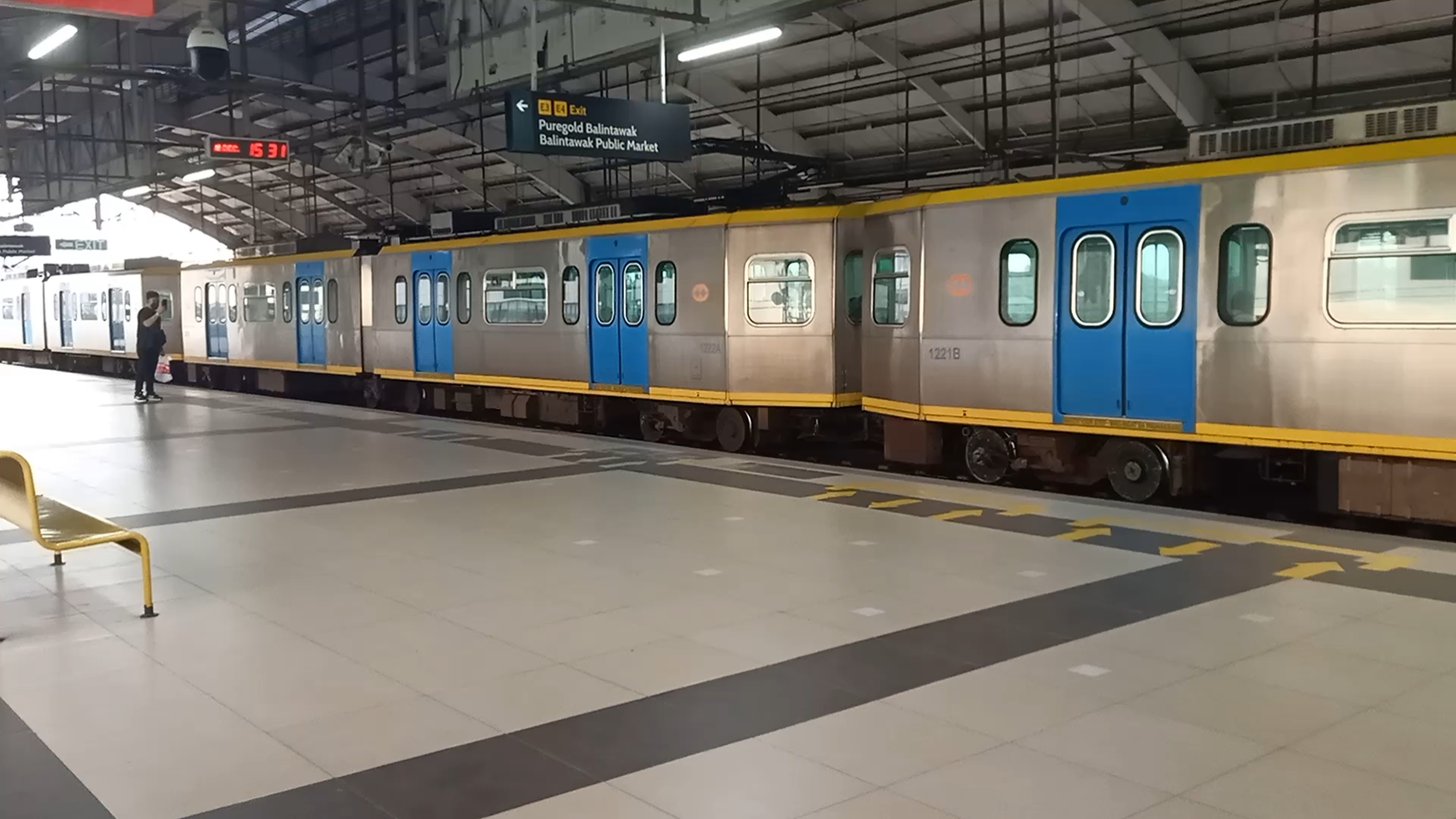
A 1200 class train at Balintawak station in December 2021.

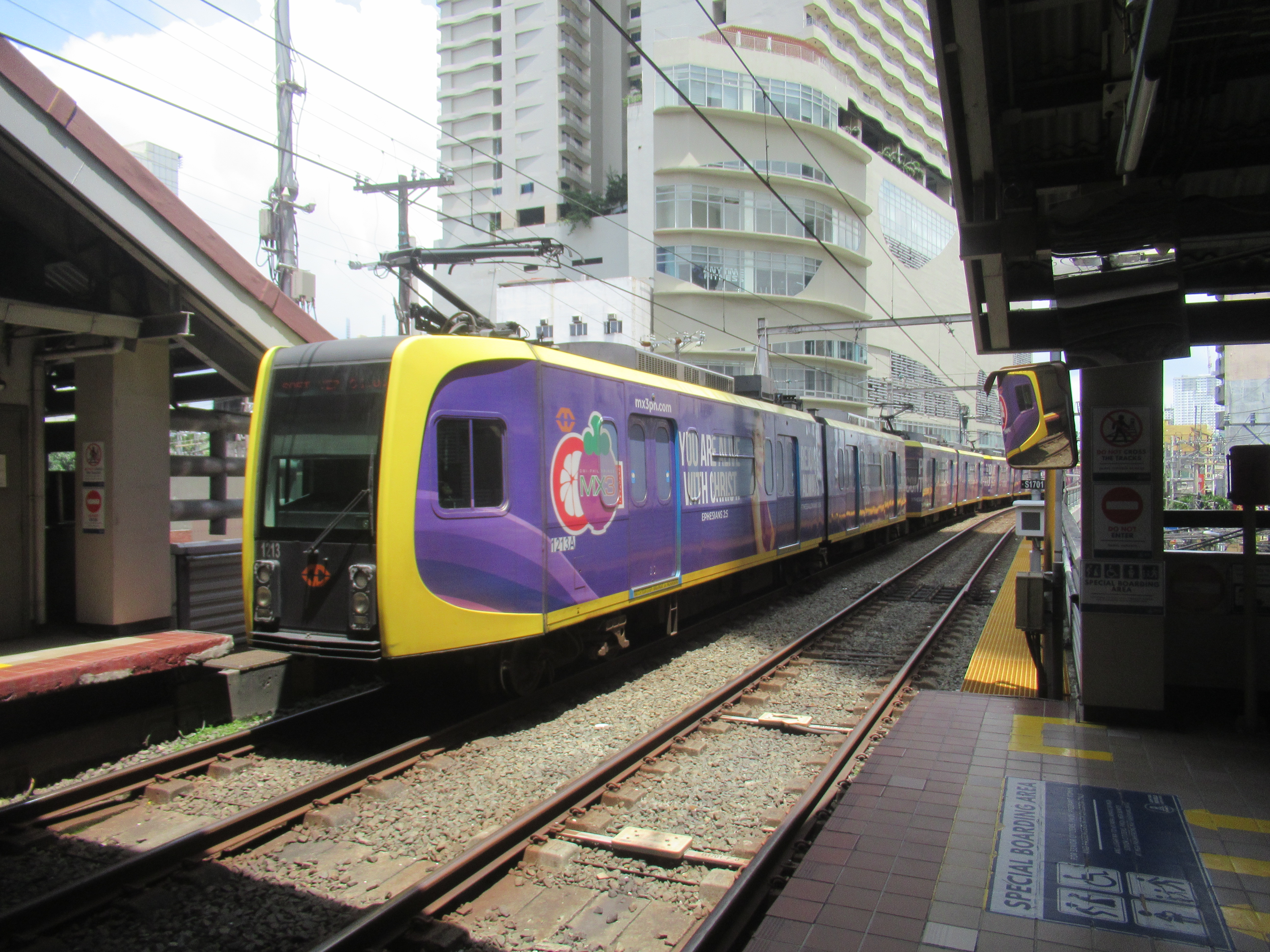
A 1200 class train with wrap advertising at Vito Cruz in August 2023.

=== Interior ===
The interior is color-toned based on light and dark two-color green in the seats to complement the landscape of Manila. Seats are made of fiber reinforced plastic and has an aluminum bracket type cantilever longitudinal seat for reducing weight. Seating and grip sticks are designed to have ergonomic dimensions, aside from equipment arrangement inside the cab. A wheelchair-compatible space is provided beside the gangway of the intermediate car, alongside an equipped fire extinguisher.

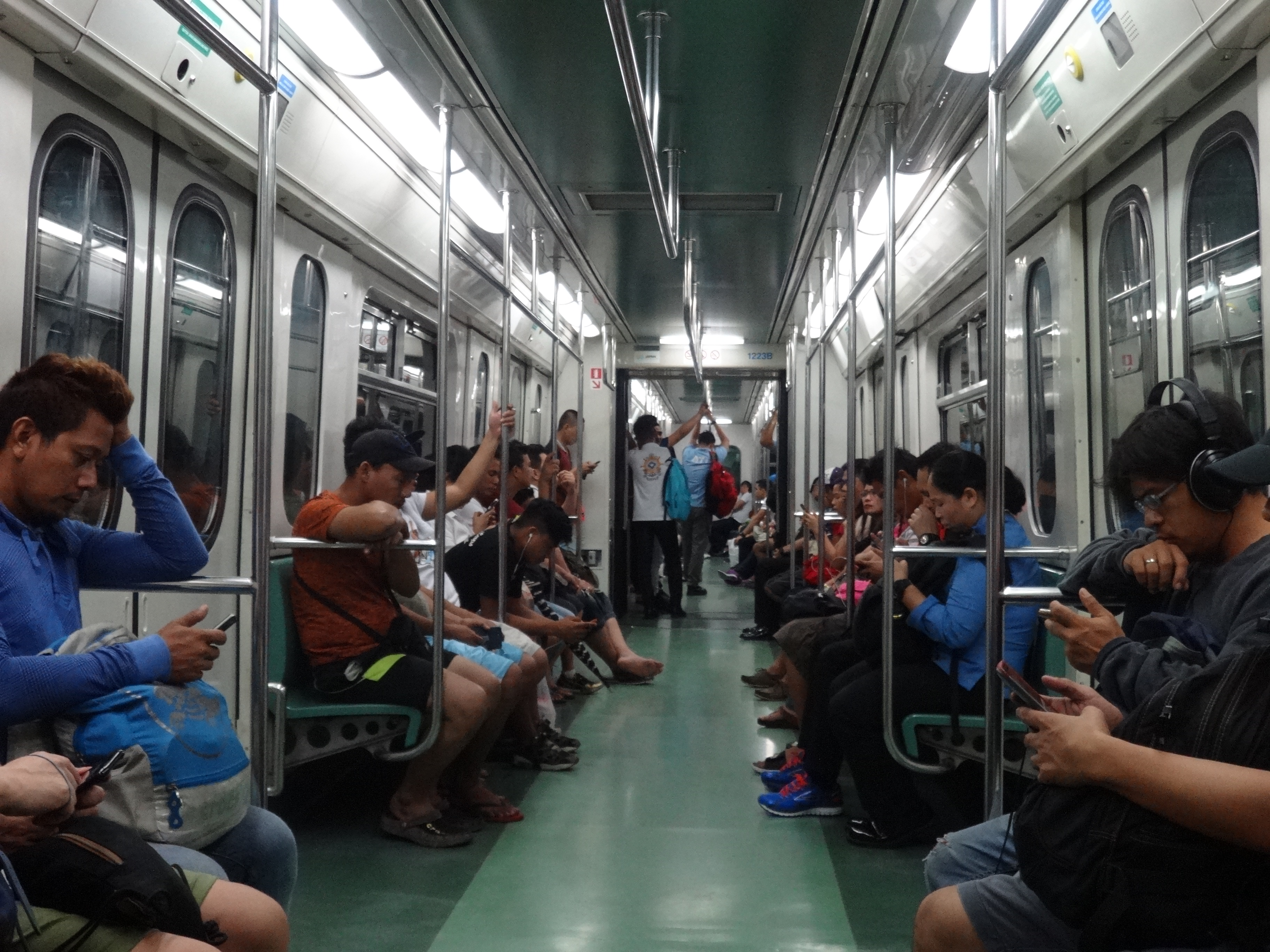
1200 class interior

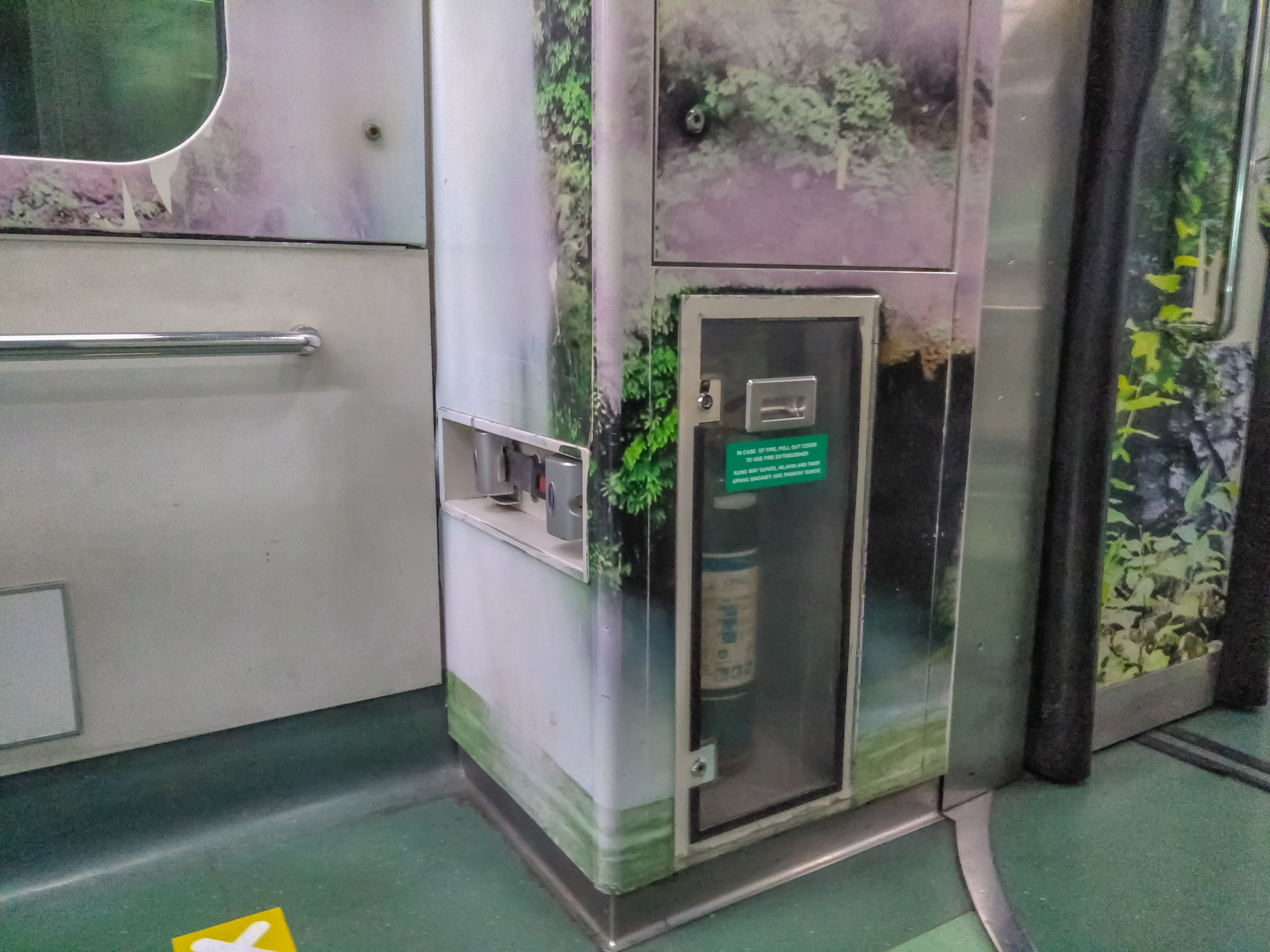
Wheelchair strap and space, and fire extinguisher

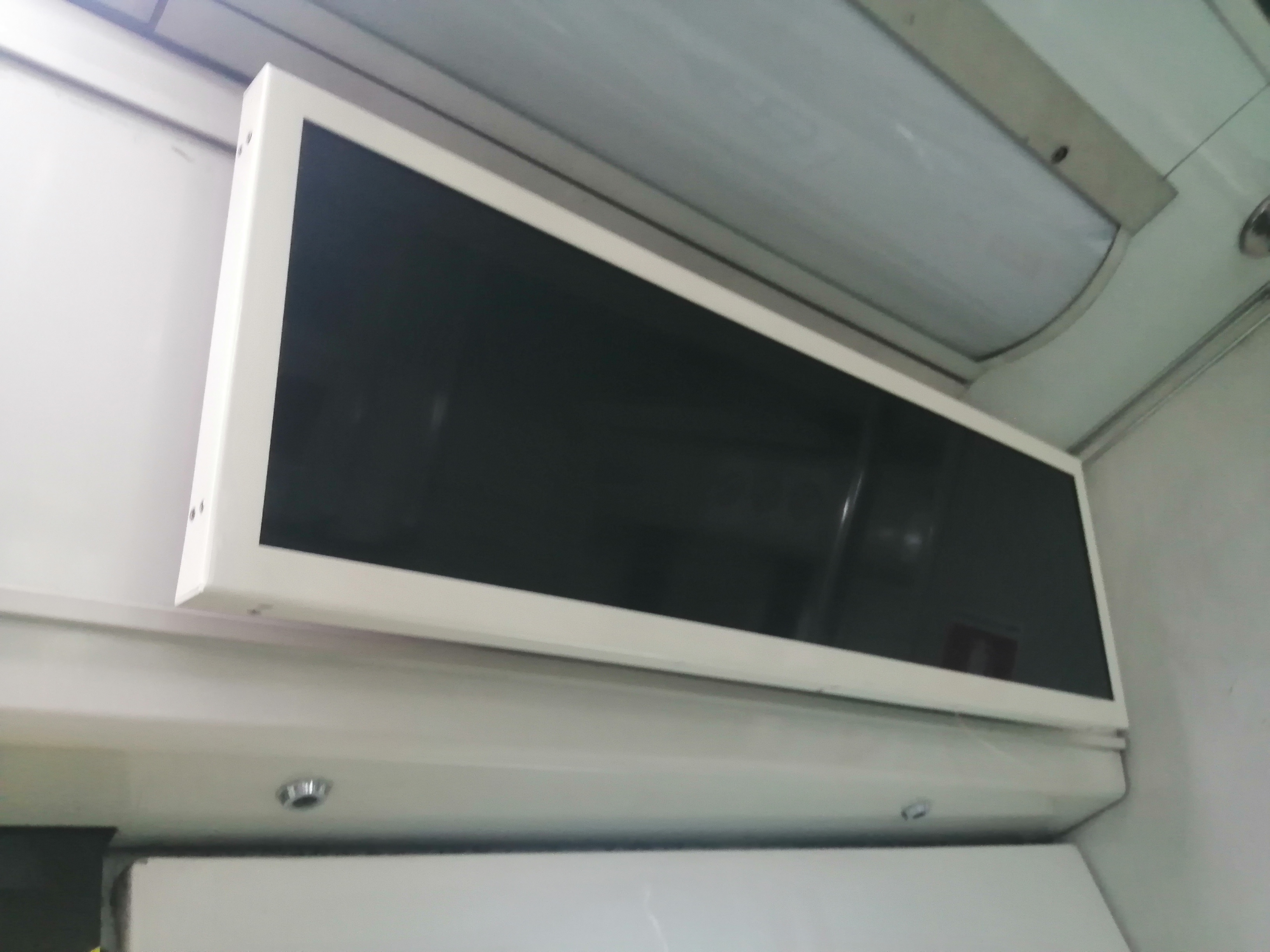
The now-unused Tube information system

=== Electrical ===
Each LRV consists of four totally enclosed, self-ventilated 3-phase AC induction motors, driven by variable-voltage/variable-frequency drive (VVVF) inverters. Auxiliary power is sourced from 440-volt alternating current static inverters and 110-volt direct current batteries.

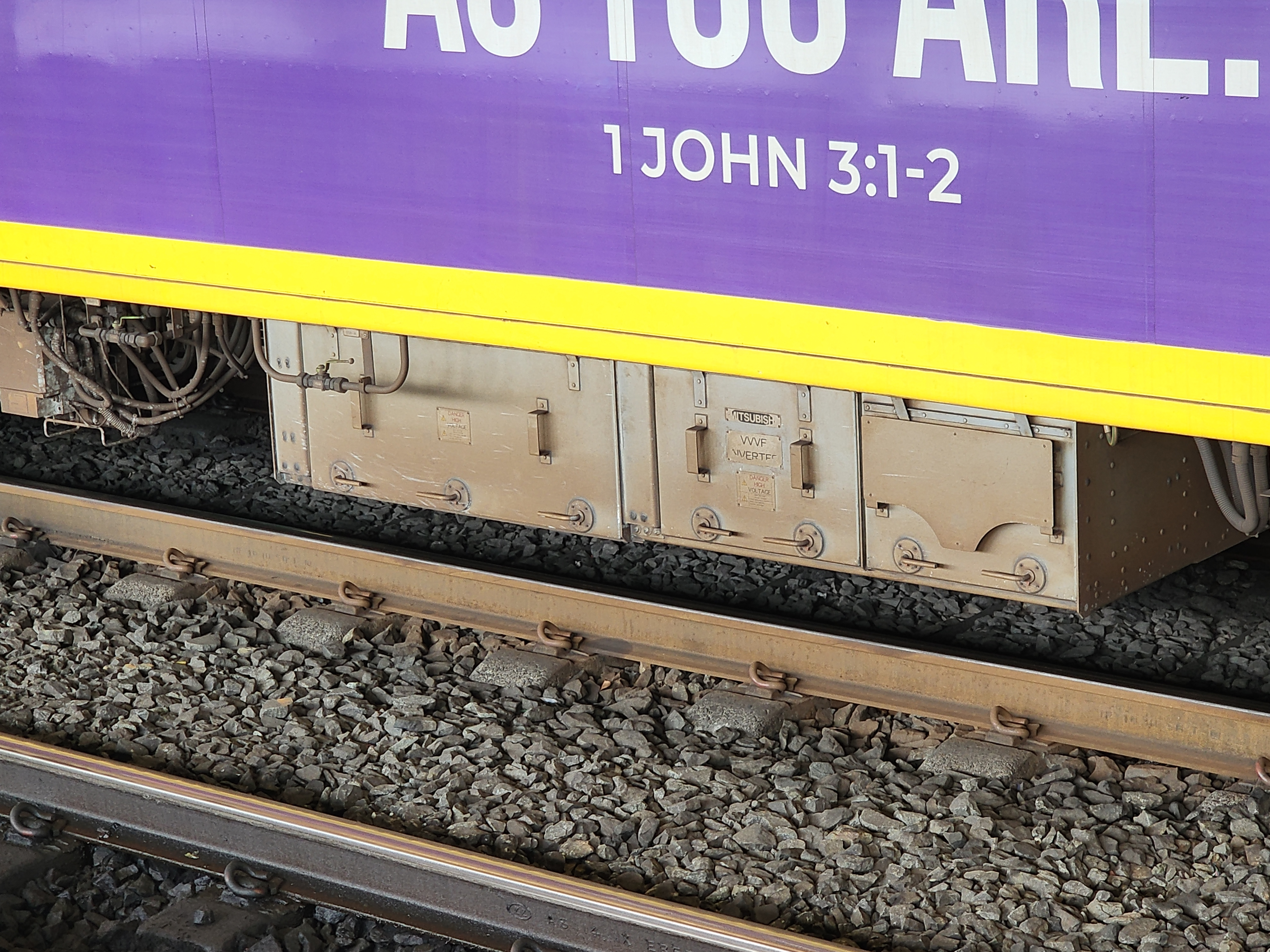
Mitsubishi Electric VVVF inverter of a 1200 class LRV.

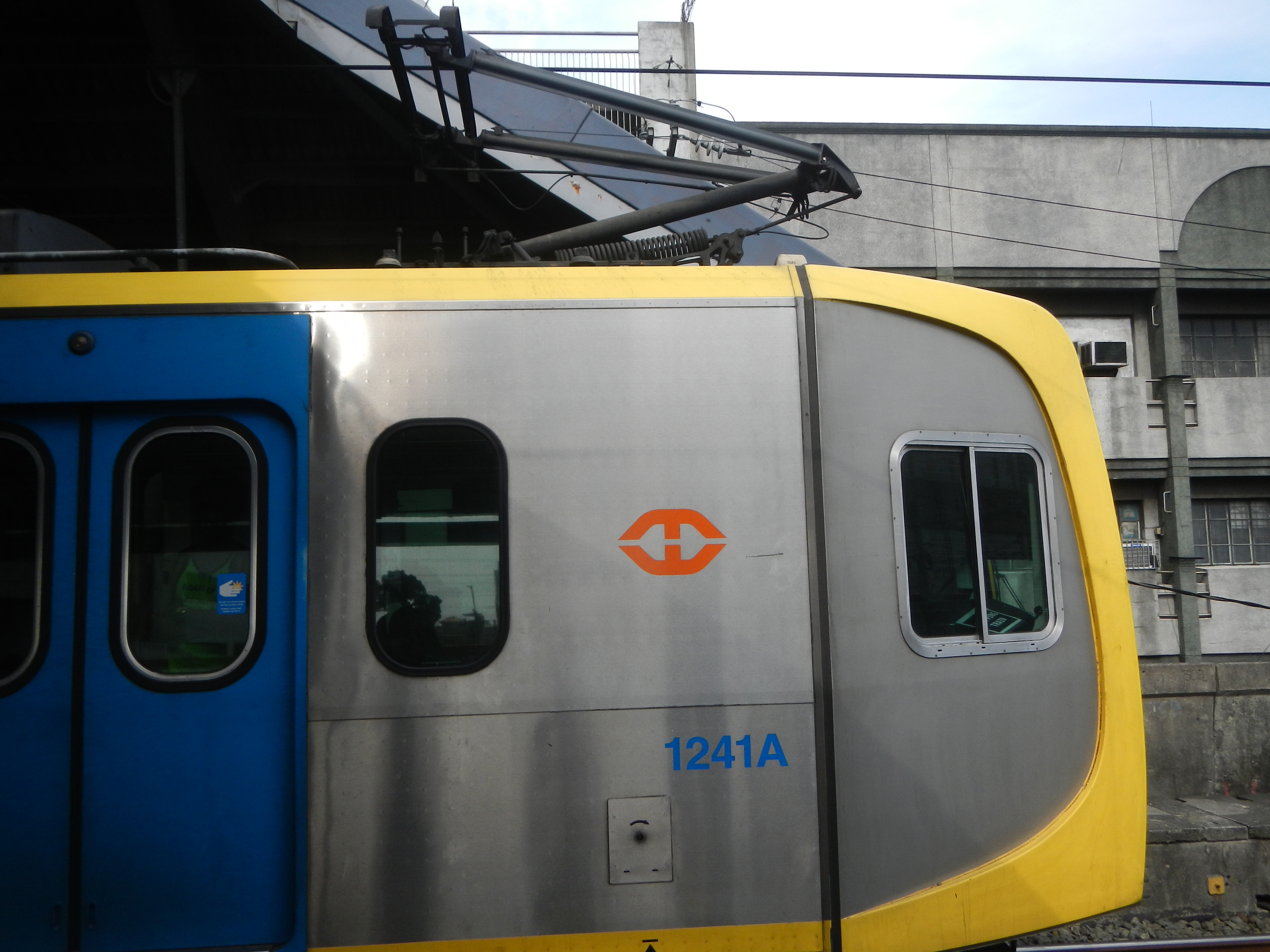
A single-arm pantograph above the driving car of the 1200 class

=== Mechanical and braking ===
Each LRV has three inside-frame bogies, similar to the 1000 class. The bogies consist of two motorized bogies at the ends of the LRV and one shared trailer bogie under the articulation. The primary suspension is a chevron rubber spring, while the secondary suspension is an air suspension, similar to the 1100 class. Semi-permanent couplers are present in the ends of each light rail vehicle except the driving cab section of the MC car.

The 1200 class employs a regenerative and electronically controlled pneumatic braking system manufactured by Knorr-Bremse. The resistors are mounted on the roof for backup regenerative brakes. Each VVVF controller is equipped with an Electronic Command Braking Device (ECBD). Disc brakes are present on the bogies.

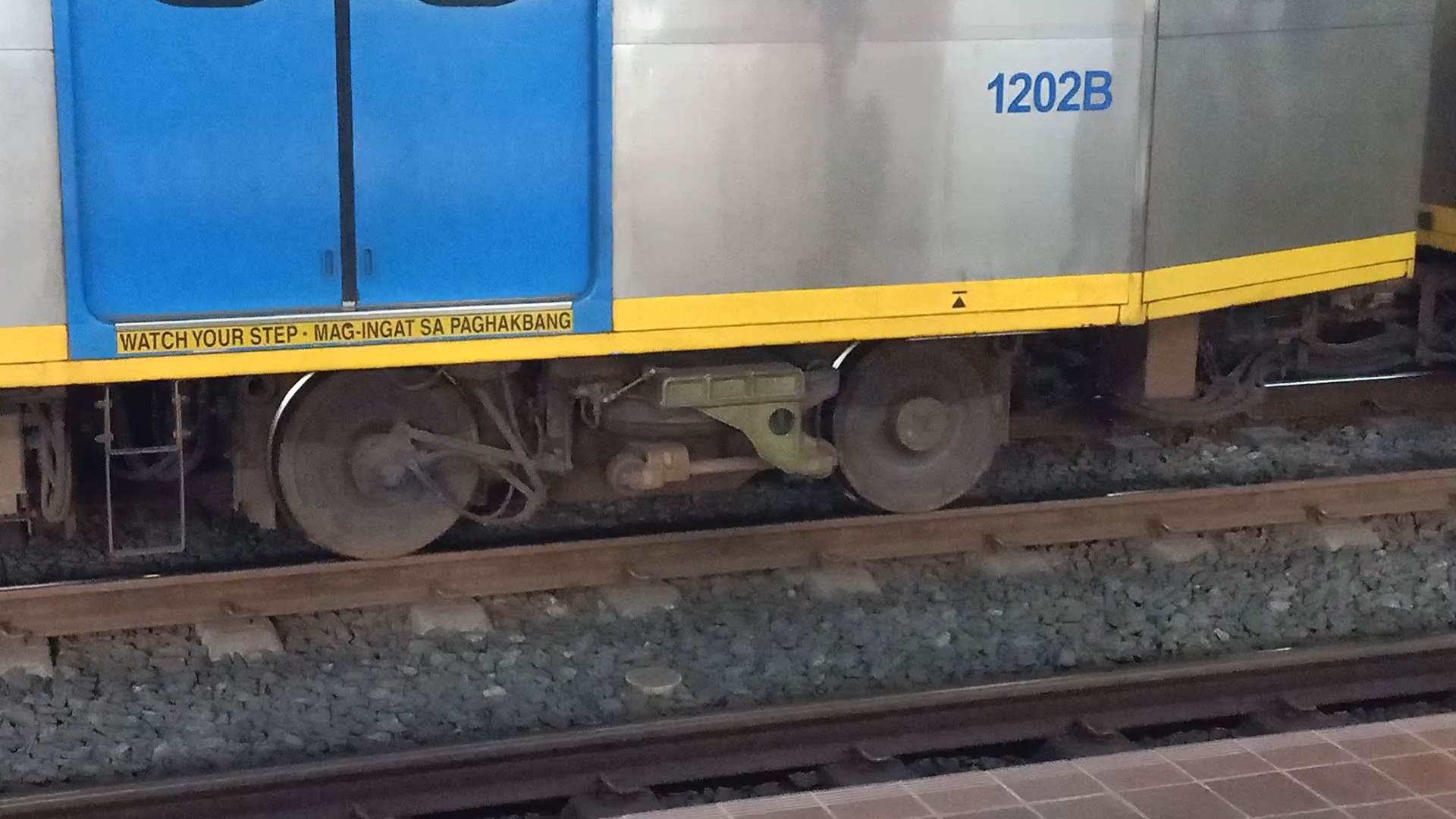
The inside-frame bogie of a 1200 class LRV.

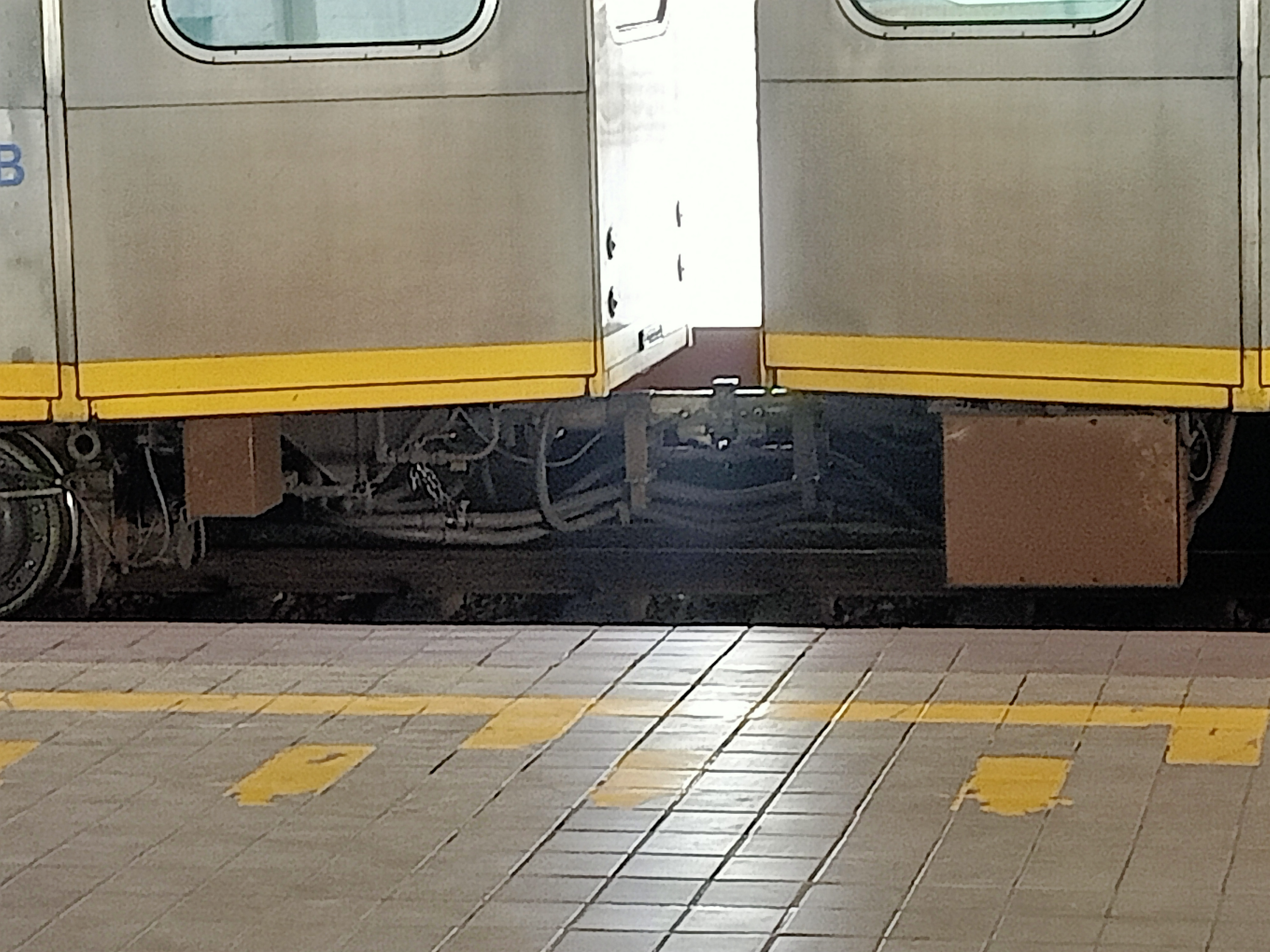
Semi-permanent couplers of the 1200 class

== Train formation ==
The configuration of a four-car trainset is Mc–M–M–Mc. Mc denotes a driving car while M denotes an intermediate car.

Cars of 1200 class
Car type		Mc		M	
Car type		A-car	B-car	A-car	B-car
Quantity		2		2	
Control cab		Yes	No	No	No
VVVF inverter		Yes	Yes	Yes	Yes
Auxiliary inverter		Yes	Yes	Yes	Yes
Pantograph		Yes	No	Yes	No
Car length	m	26.35		26.5	
Car length	ft in	86 ft 5 13/32 in		86 ft 11 5/16 in	
Capacity	Seated	66		70	
Capacity	Standing	272		286	
Capacity	Total	338		356	

== Incidents ==
- On June 24, 2010, two trains (1G and 3G) collided at Balintawak station. As a result, LRVs 1248 and 1247 sustained damage. There were plans to restore it, but the involved cars remain idle as of 2022.
- On February 18, 2011, two trains (1G and 3G) collided near Roosevelt Station in Quezon City at the reversing tracks, around a kilometer away to the east. There were no passengers on board when the incident happened. This caused the Roosevelt and Balintawak stations to remain closed for two months until the stations were reopened on April 11, 2011. An investigation was conducted and was shown that one of the drivers was texting when the incident occurred. This however caused LRV 1236, the 3G unit involved in the incident, to be in idle state and has not yet been restored for service.
- On May 23, 2015, thousands of passengers were stranded after two trains (1G and 3G) collided near the Monumento station. A train driver was hurt after the impact caused his head to slam into the dashboard of the train. The accident, later revealed to be caused by power fluctuation that affected the signalling system, forced passengers to alight from the station until services was restored around 1 pm at the same day.

== Build details (original configurations) ==
All 1200 class trains were designed and built to agreed specifications with no comparable differences.

Set No.	1	2	3	4	Manufacturer	Notes
1	1201	1202	1203	1204	Kinki Sharyo	—N/a
2	1205	1206	1207	1208	Kinki Sharyo	—N/a
3	1209	1210	1211	1212	Nippon Sharyo	—N/a
4	1213	1214	1215	1216	Nippon Sharyo	—N/a
5	1217	1218	1219	1220	Kinki Sharyo	—N/a
6	1221	1222	1223	1224	Kinki Sharyo	—N/a
7	1225	1226	1227	1228	Nippon Sharyo	—N/a
8	1229	1230	1231	1232	Nippon Sharyo	—N/a
9	1233	1234	1235	1236	Kinki Sharyo	1233–1234 re-configured to 1246–1245
10	1237	1238	1239	1240	Kinki Sharyo	—N/a
11	1241	1242	1243	1244	Nippon Sharyo	—N/a
12	1245	1246	1247	1248	Nippon Sharyo	1246–1245 re-configured to 1233–1234

== Sources ==
- Kinki Sharyo (October 2006). New product マニラ1号線向け連接電車 (PDF) (Report) (in Japanese). Archived from the original (PDF) on April 9, 2018.
- Nippon Sharyo (January 2007). フィリピン・マニラ都市圏軽軌道公社殿向けLRT１号線用車両完成 (Report) (in Japanese). Archived from the original on November 16, 2015.
- Knorr-Bremse Group (PDF) (Report). September 22, 2011.
- Japan International Cooperation Agency; Oriental Consultants Co., Ltd.; ALMEC Corporation; Katahira & Engineers International; Tonichi Engineering Consultants, Inc. (July 2013). Study on railway strategy for enhancement of railway network system in Metro Manila of the Republic of the Philippines: Final report, Vol.1-LRT Line 1: Cavite extension project (2013) (PDF) (Report). Archived (PDF) from the original on December 27, 2021.
- Japan International Cooperation Agency; Oriental Consultants Co., Ltd.; ALMEC Corporation; Katahira & Engineers International; Tonichi Engineering Consultants, Inc. (July 2013b). "Appendices" (PDF). Study on railway strategy for enhancement of railway network system in Metro Manila of the Republic of the Philippines: Final report, Vol.1 LRT Line 1: Cavite extension project (2013) (Report). Archived (PDF) from the original on December 27, 2021.
- Department of Transportation and Communications; Light Rail Transit Authority (September 14, 2012). PROJECT NO. 5B Restoration of Two (2) 3rd Generation LRVs (RE-BID) (PDF) (Report). Archived from the original (PDF) on December 28, 2021.
- Otsuki, Tsutomu (2007). "The Commissioning – In Case of a Project in Manila" (PDF). KS World. 14. Kinki Sharyo: 12–13. Archived from the original (PDF) on September 28, 2011.
- Japan International Cooperation Agency (2012). Ex-Post Evaluation of Japanese ODA Loan Project - LRT Line 1 Capacity Expansion Project (II) (PDF) (Report).
