= T4 (Istanbul Tram) =

Tram line in Istanbul

T4 Topkapı - Mescid-i Selam

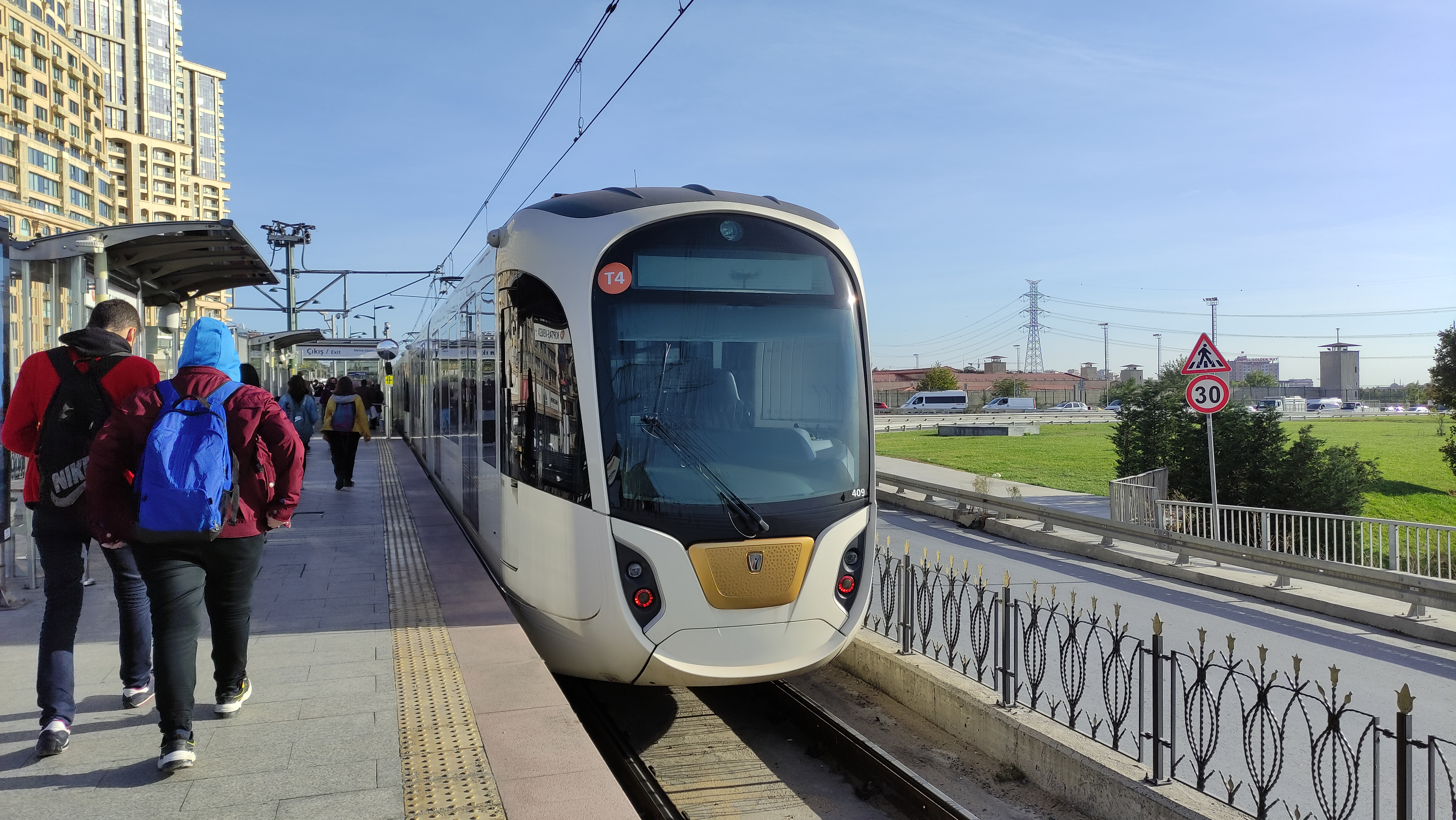
- T4 line go from Kiptaş Venezia station to Topkapı direction

Overview
- Owner: Istanbul Metropolitan Municipality
- Locale: Istanbul, Turkey
- Stations: 22

Service
- Type: Light rail
- System: Istanbul Tram
- Operator: Metro Istanbul
- Rolling stock: 78
- Daily ridership: 95,000

History
- Opened: 12 September 2007

Technical
- Track length: 15.3 km (9.5 mi)
- Track gauge: 1,435 mm (4 ft 8 1/2 in) standard gauge

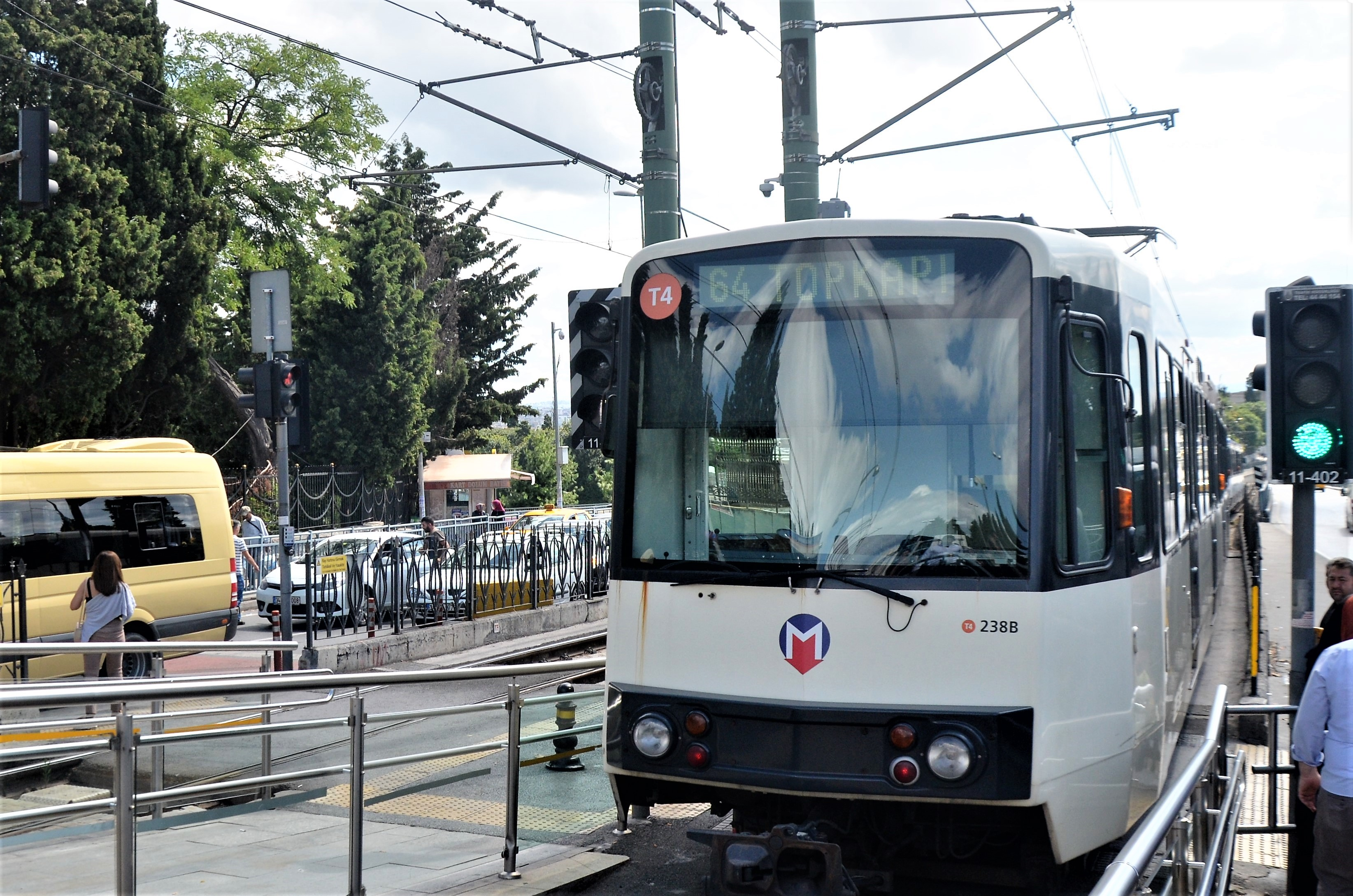
Topkapı-bound Istanbul Tram line T4 train at Şehitlik station

T4 Topkapı - Mescid-i Selam tram line (Turkish: T4 Topkapı - Mescid-i Selam tramvay hattı) is a light rail line in Istanbul, Turkey, operated by Istanbul Ulaşım AŞ. It runs from Topkapı north to Mescid-i Selam, a total of 15.3 km (9.5 mi). The T4 line operates its own right-of-way in a street median for most of its route, though with a few at-grade crossings, thus technically making it light rail though the operator Metro Istanbul categorizes it as a tramline.

The first section of the T4 line opened between Edirnekapı and Mescid-i Selam on 12 September 2007. An extension southwest of Edirnekapı to Topkapı was opened on 18 March 2009.

Connections to the M1 line are available at Vatan station, while connections to the T1 tram line and the Istanbul Metrobus are available at Topkapı station.

== Stations ==
Station	Type	Transfer	District	Notes
Topkapı	Level	・ İETT Bus: 31, 31E, 33B, 41AT, 50B, 71T, 72T, 73, 73F, 76D, 79Ş, 82, 85C, 85T, 89, 89B, 89K, 92, 92T, 97, 97A, 97B, 97BT, 97T, 500L, MR11	Zeytinburnu	Southern terminus
Fetihkapı	Level	İETT Bus: 31E, 33E, 33Y, 36Y, 41AT, 50B, 50K, 76T, 79E, 85C, 89C, 92K, 93M, 145M, 145T, 336Y, 500A, 500L, E-56	Zeytinburnu	
Vatan	Viaduct	(Vatan station); İETT Bus: 28, 31E, 35D, 38, 38B, 38E, 38Z, 41AT, 41ST, 50B, 50K, 87, 88A, 93M, 500A, 500L	Eyüpsultan	Park and Ride facility
Edirnekapı	Underground	İETT Bus: 28, 31E, 35D, 36KE, 36V, 38, 38B, 38E, 38Z, 41AT, 41ST, 50A, 50B, 50K, 50P, 50V, 50Y, 86V, 87, 88A, 93M, 336E, 500L	Eyüpsultan	Original southern terminus
Şehitlik	Level	İETT Bus: 36KE, 36V, 38, 38B, 38E, 38Z, 50A, 50B, 50K, 50P, 50V, 50Y, 86V, 88A, 336E	Eyüpsultan	
Demirkapı	Level	İETT Bus: 36, 36KE, 36V, 38, 38B, 38E, 38Z, 50A, 50B, 50K, 50P, 50V, 50Y, 86V, 88A, 336E	Eyüpsultan	
Topçular	Underground	İETT Bus: 36, 36KE, 36V, 38, 38B, 38E, 38Z, 50A, 50P, 88A, 336E	Eyüpsultan	
Rami	Underground	İETT Bus: 36, 36KE, 36V, 38, 38B, 38E, 38Z, 50A, 50P, 55Y, 336E	Eyüpsultan	
Uluyol-Bereç	Underground	İETT Bus: 36, 36KE, 36V, 38, 38B, 38E, 38Z, 336E	Gaziosmanpaşa	
Sağmalcılar	Level	İETT Bus: 36, 36KE, 36V, 38, 38B, 38E, 38Z, 336E	Gaziosmanpaşa	
Bosna-Çukurçeşme	Level	İETT Bus: 36, 36KE, 36V, 336E	Gaziosmanpaşa	
Ali Fuat Başgil	Underground	İETT Bus: 36, 36KE, 36V, 336E	Gaziosmanpaşa	
Taşköprü	Underground	İETT Bus: 36, 36KE, 36V, 336E	Gaziosmanpaşa	
Karadeniz	Underground	İETT Bus: 36, 36KE, 36V, 336E, HT5	Gaziosmanpaşa	
KİPTAŞ Venezia	Level	(Karadeniz Mahallesi station); İETT Bus: 36V, 336E	Gaziosmanpaşa	Formerly known as Metris
Cumhuriyet	Level	İETT Bus: 36V, 79GE, 79KM, 79KT, 336, 336E, 336G, 336M, 336Y	Sultangazi	
50. Yıl-Baştabya	Level	İETT Bus: 36V, 79GE, 79KM, 79KT, 336, 336E, 336G, 336M, 336Y	Sultangazi	
Hacı Şükrü	Level	İETT Bus: 36V, 336E, 336Y	Sultangazi	
Yeni Mahalle	Level	İETT Bus: 36V, 336E, 336Y	Sultangazi	
Sultançiftliği	Level	İETT Bus: 36B, 36CB, 36CE, 36F, 36HT, 36L, 36V, 78C, 336E, 336MC, 336Y	Sultangazi	
Cebeci	Level	İETT Bus: 36B, 36CB, 36F, 36HT, 36L, 36V, 78C, 79C, 336E, 336MC, TM18	Sultangazi	
Mescid-i Selam	Level	İETT Bus: 36B, 36CB, 36F, 36HT, 36L, 36V, 36Y, 38H, 48G, 50AB, 79C, 79F, 79KM, 79KT, 336, 336A, 336K, 336M, 336MC, H-6, TM18	Sultangazi	
↓↓ 2029 Construct Planing ↓↓
Eski Habibler	????	İETT Bus: 36B, 36CB, 36F, 36HT, 36S, 36V, 36Y, 38H, 48G, 79C, 79F, 79KM, 79KT, 336, 366A, 336K, 336M, 336MC, H-6	Sultangazi	
Habibler	????	İETT Bus: 36B, 36CB, 36F, 36HT, 36S, 36V, 36Y, 48G, 79C, 79F, 79KM, 79KT, 336, 366A, 336K, 336M, 336MC, H-6	Sultangazi	
Pirinççi	????	İETT Bus: 36B, 36CB, 36F, 36HT, 36S, 36V, 36Y, 79C, 79F, 79KM, 79KT, 336, 366A, 336K, 336M, 336MC, H-6	Eyüpsultan	

== Rolling stock ==
=== ABB ===
For a brief period of time, bulky high-floor ABB LRVs (similar to ones used in M1) were used. After additional rolling stock was added however these trains were moved to operate on the M1 line.

=== Duewag ===
These are old B80S and B100S sets that were used on Cologne Stadtbahn and purchased in 2007. They were used on both T1 and T4 lines (including the ex-T2 that merged into T1) and with the arrival of Alstom Citadis trams on the T1 line they began to operate on the T4 line only.

=== Hyundai Rotem LRV34 ===
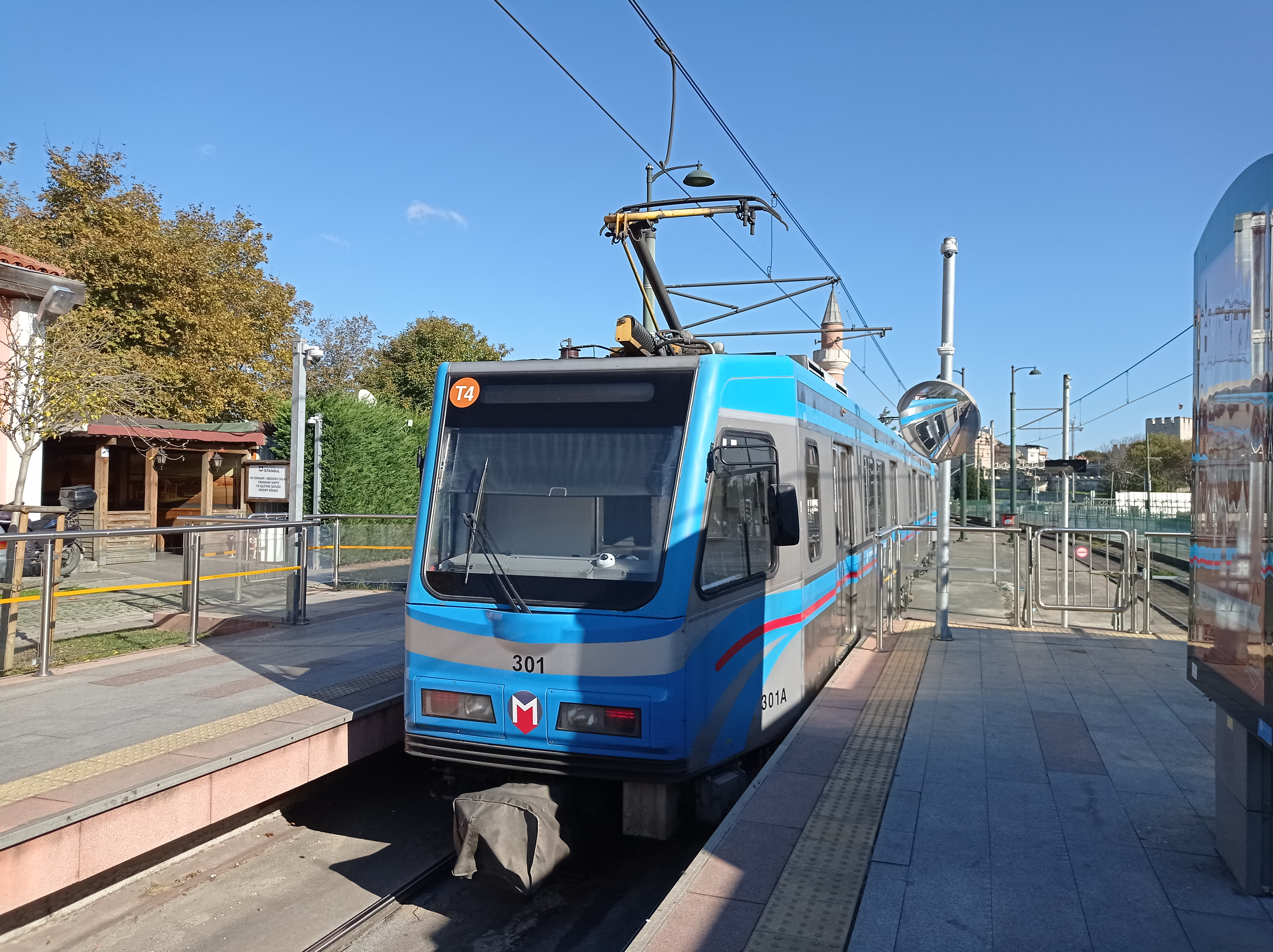
Hyundai Rotem LRV34

From 2008, 63 units. Same vehicles used in on the Adana Metro and very similar to the LRTA 1100 class in Manila, Philippines. Unlike the other models, these only have a cab at one end.

=== RTE ===
More recently (from 2014) new high-floor trams that were constructed by Metro Istanbul (the operator) itself are also used. During its development, there were intermediate models (RTE 2000 and RTE 2009) that operated on the line.

== See also ==
- Istanbul Tram
- Istanbul Metro
- Istanbul nostalgic tramways
- Public transport in Istanbul
