= Adana Metro =

Rapid transit network serving Adana, Turkey

Coordinates: 37°03′11″N 35°15′26″E

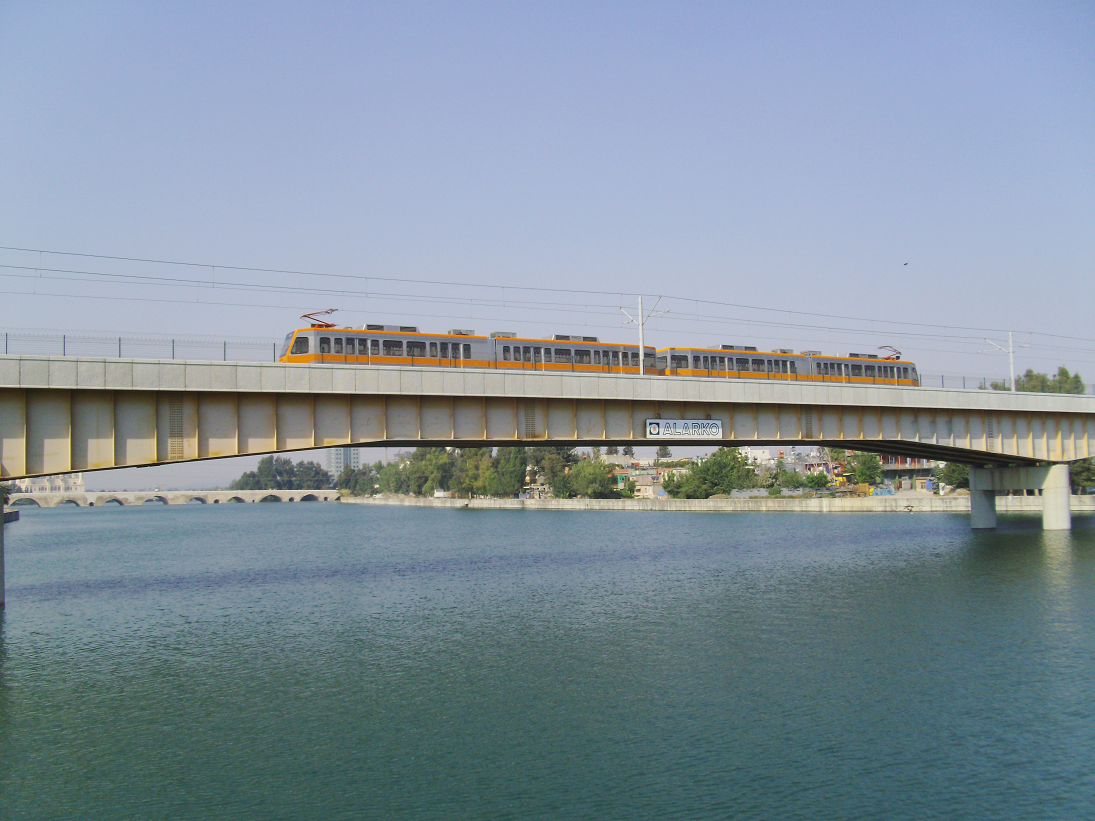

Overview
- Native name: Adana metrosu
- Locale: Adana, Adana Province, Turkey
- Transit type: Rapid transit/Light metro
- Number of lines: 1
- Number of stations: 13 (7 more planned)

Operation
- Began operation: 18 March 2009; 17 years ago (trial service); 14 May 2010; 16 years ago (revenue service)
- Operator: Adana Metropolitan Municipality
- Number of vehicles: 12
- Headway: 10–15 minutes

Technical
- System length: 13.5 km (8.4 mi); 9.3 km (5.8 mi) (under construction)
- Track gauge: 1,435 mm (4 ft 8 1/2 in) standard gauge
- Electrification: 750 V DC Overhead line
- Top speed: 80 km/h (50 mph)
System map
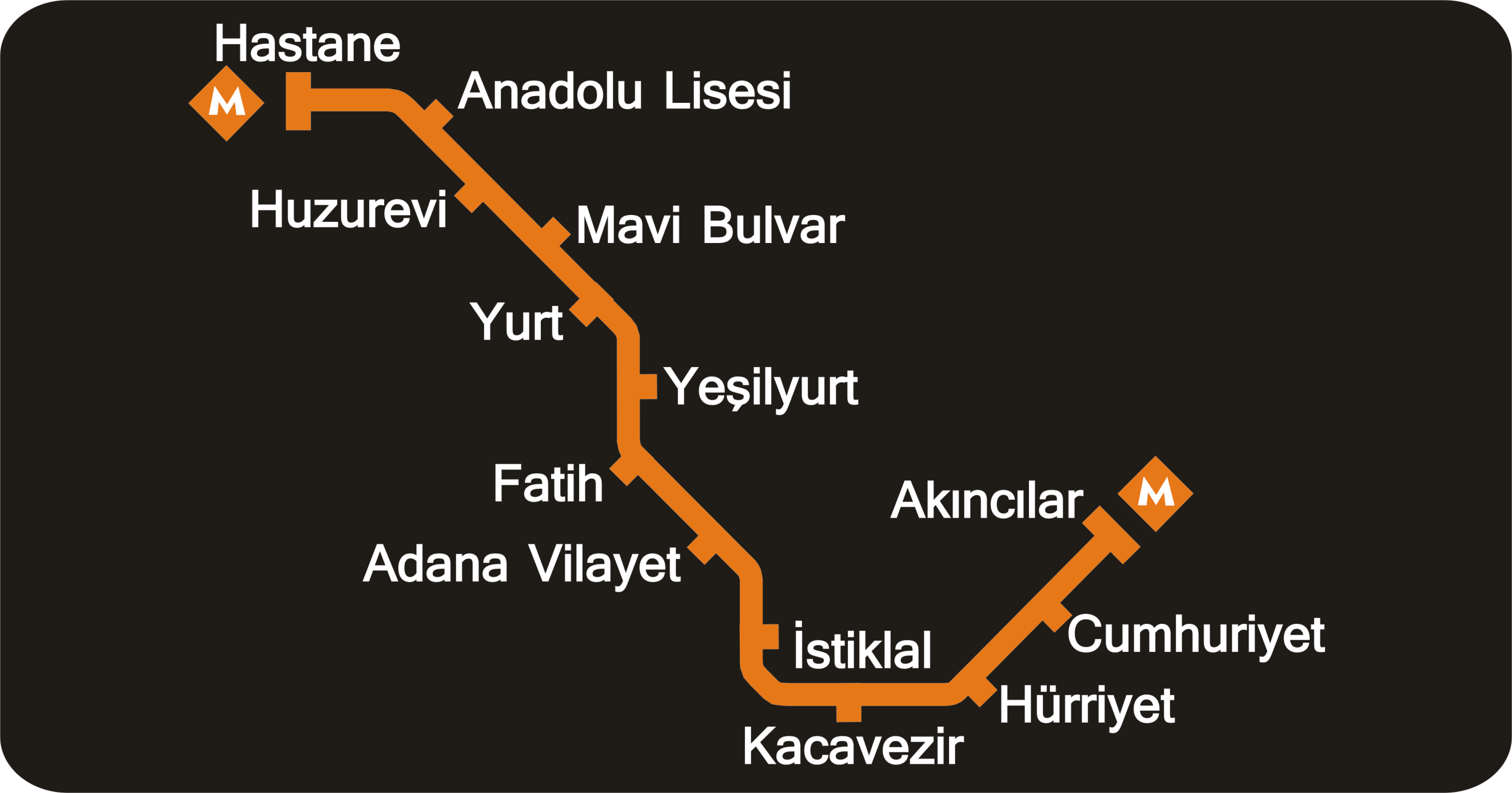

The Adana Metro (Turkish: Adana metrosu) is a rapid transit system extending 13.5 kilometers (8.39 mi) along a north–south corridor through Adana, Turkey, with 13 stations. It can transport 21,600 passengers per hour per direction. The total travel time on the metro, end to end, takes 21 minutes, including all stops.

== History ==
The rapid transit system for Adana was initiated in 1988 after requests from the mayor Aytaç Durak and the Çukurova University rector Mithat Özsan to the Ministry of Transportation. A feasibility report was completed on 30 May 1990 by the consortium of PMBI A.Ş. and Brinckerkoff Int.Inc. The report was approved by the State Planning Agency and the construction of the rapid transit system was included in the 1993 investment program. In 1996, the project was contracted to Adtranz-Alarko-ABB Electric Consortium for $US 340 million.

To accommodate the new residential developments along the project route and to better integrate northern and southern Adana, the Adana Metropolitan Municipality decided to make an amendment to the project plan by extending the line to southern Adana. The southernmost point of the initial project had been the D-400 state road. Amendments were approved by State Planning Agency in 1999 and the construction of the metro started on 28 January 1999.

Unexpected costs increases during the construction of the Metro led to the need for extra funding for the project. Metropolitan Municipality made a request to State Planning Agency for new funding, but the request was declined. As a result, construction of the Metro stopped in 2002. After 6 years, the Municipality was able to get approval for new funding of $US 194.2 million and construction resumed in 2008.

On 18 March 2009, the Metro was partially opened for the 8 km (4.97 mi) long section between Hastane and Vilayet stations, with a 36-car fleet purchased from Hyundai Rotem. After 3 months of free service, this section of the Metro was closed to service for completing the 5 km (3.11 mi) underground section between Vilayet and Akıncılar.

All sections of the Adana Metro opened for full public service on 14 May 2010.

The cut-and-cover tunnels with a diameter of 5 m (16 ft 5 in), a depth between 15–16 m (49 ft 3 in – 52 ft 6 in) and 1.13 km (0.70 mi) length, were constructed as the part of metro construction. The tunnels constructed a few meters deeper than the underground water level (12 m (39 ft 4 in)).

== Operations ==
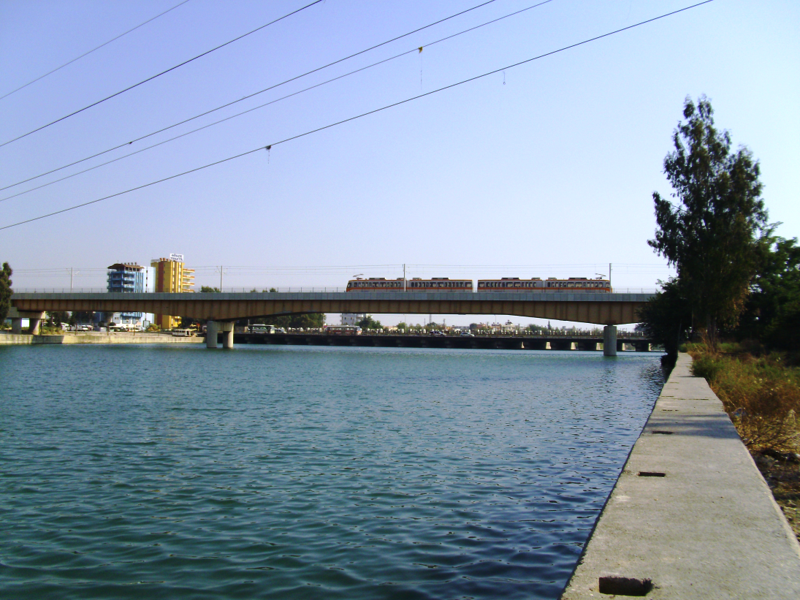
Metro train crossing the river

Adana Metro is a 13.9-kilometer (8.6 mi) long double track rail line, of which 3.5 kilometers (2.2 mi) is underground (in cut and cover tunnels), 2.5 kilometers (1.6 mi) is in trench, 5.3 kilometers (3.3 mi) is elevated, and 2.55 kilometers (1.58 mi) is at-grade.

=== Service ===
The Metro runs from 6:00 am to 23:30 pm every day, running every 10 minutes during weekday peak hours and every 15 minutes at other times such as weekends. The total travel time on the metro, end to end, takes 21 minutes, including all stops. Its passenger capacity is 21,600 passengers per hour per direction (PPHPD). The metro is part of the Metropolitan Municipality Bus Department (ABBO) network where an adult fare costs 1 TL for Kentkart holders which allows a passenger to have up to one hour for a one-way trip. Several bus and dolmuş lines are connected to the stations.

=== Route ===
The line starts from the metro-car depot west of the Hospital for Mental Health. Following Turgut Özal Boulevard, the line reaches Anadolu Lycee, then turns south and follows Alparslan Türkeş Boulevard, crosses TCDD rail tracks near the City Hall and enters Southern Adana passing the D-400 state road. It then heads to the west of the Kocavezir Commercial Center and the Hürriyet Police Station until it reaches the Seyhan River. Crossing the river just north of the Regülatör Bridge, the line heads north, again crossing the D-400 state road and ends next to Yüreğir Bus Terminal.

=== Stations ===
The Metro has total of 13 stations on one line, of which 4 are underground, 5 are elevated, and 4 are on the surface. All the stations are equipped with escalators and elevators for the disabled.

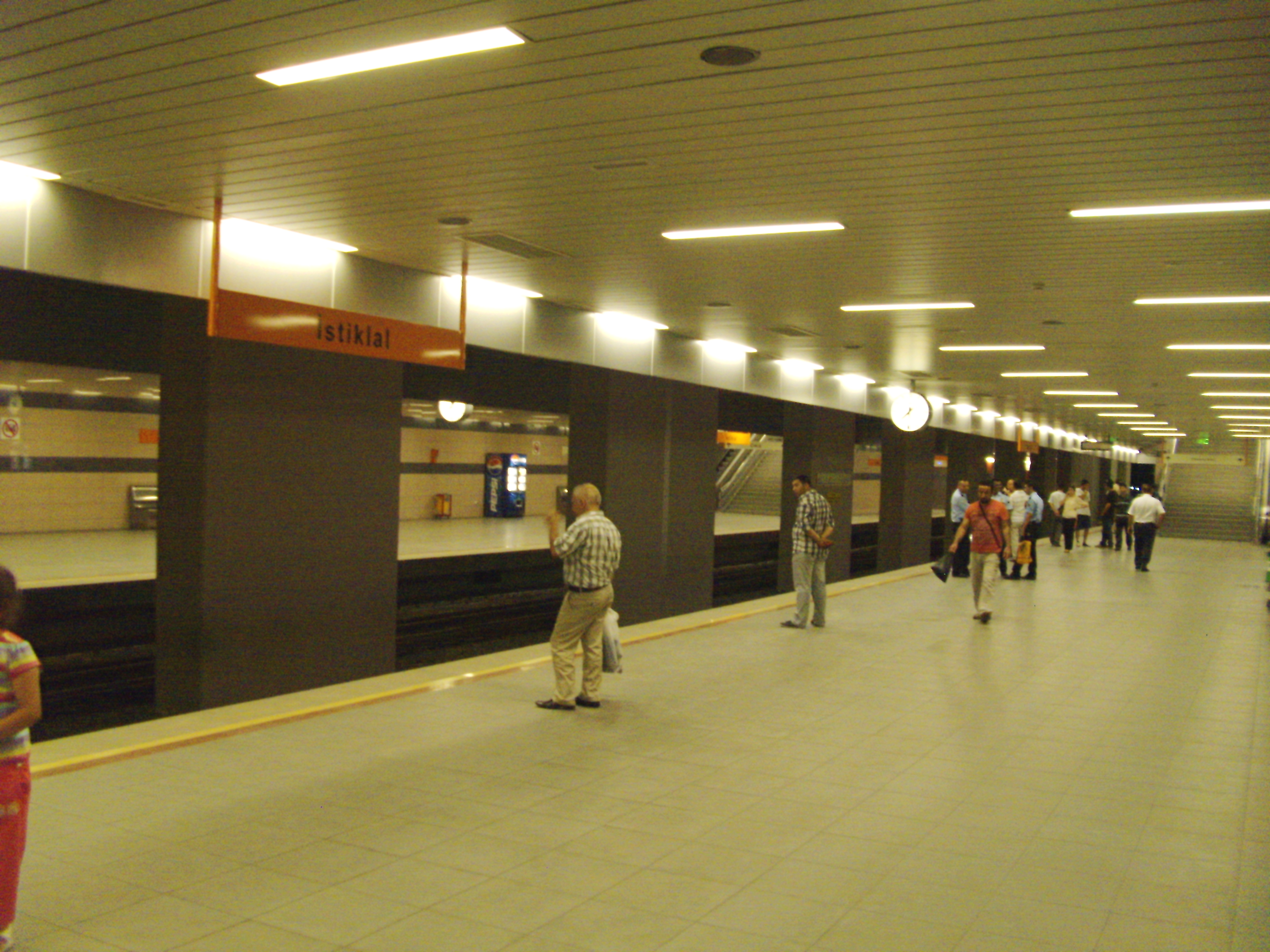
İstiklal Station

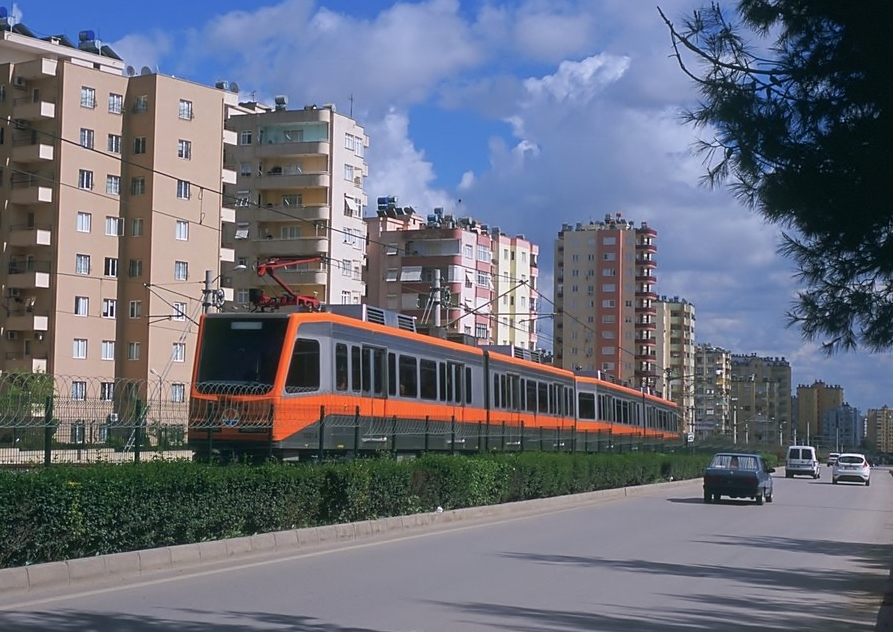
Near Huzurevi station

Station	Level	Connection	Feeding Bus Route
Hastane	Underground	Turgut Özal Boulevard	Bahçeşehir - Carrefour - Adana Koop
Anadolu Lisesi	Underground	Turgut Özal Boulevard	Seyhan Hospital - Kurttepe - Demirel Boulevard
Huzurevi	Ground		
Mavi Bulvar	Ground	O-50 Motorway	
Yurt	Ground		Barış Manço Blv., PTT Cad., HayalPark, Mavi Blv., Çetinkaya
Yeşilyurt	Ground		
Fatih	Elevated	Karaisalı Minibuses	Kıyıboyu Cad., Cemalpaşa, Hastaneler
Vilayet	Underground	Adana Railway Station	Valilik, İstasyon Cad., Tren Garı, Atatürk Cad., Atatürk Park
İstiklal	Underground	D-400 state road	
Kocavezir	Elevated		Bakım Yurdu Cad., Kuruköprü, Küçüksaat, Saydam Cad., Obalar Cad.
Hürriyet	Elevated	Seyhan River, Akkapı Minibuses	
Cumhuriyet	Elevated	Karataş Buses, Minibuses, Seyhan River	
Akıncılar	Elevated	D-400 & Yüreğir Bus Terminal	Kozan Yolu Buses:110, 113, 114, 116, 118 and 126

=== Rolling stock ===
Despite being named a metro, the fleet consists of 36 Hyundai Rotem light rail-style cars (Also used on tram line 4 in Istanbul), with each having the capacity for 311 passengers. Each train runs in 3-car sets with the capacity to carry up to 933 passengers. The vehicles can travel at up to 80 km/h (50 mph) in between the stations, and the trip time between Hastane and Akıncılar stations is 21 minutes including all the stops. The metro is fully secure and monitored by SCADA remote controlling system. The fleet is almost identical to the LRTA 1100 class of the Manila Light Rail Transit Line 1.

== Future service ==
The Metro will be extended from Akıncılar to the Çukurova University main campus ("second stage" project). The extension will be 9.3 kilometers (5.8 mi) long, and will have 7 stations. The project was contracted out in January 2010 and the construction was expected to start after an agreement was made with the Çukurova University. As the extension will not be a new line, it will be built consistent with the current system and it is expected to cost $US 210 million. Once the extension is completed, the Adana Metro will be 23.3 kilometers (14.5 mi) in length and serve 20 stations, and will be able to transport 660,000 daily.

There are also plans to run a suburban rail line on an existing railway with connections to the Metro.
