= LRTA 1100 class =

2nd-generation rolling stock operating at LRT-1

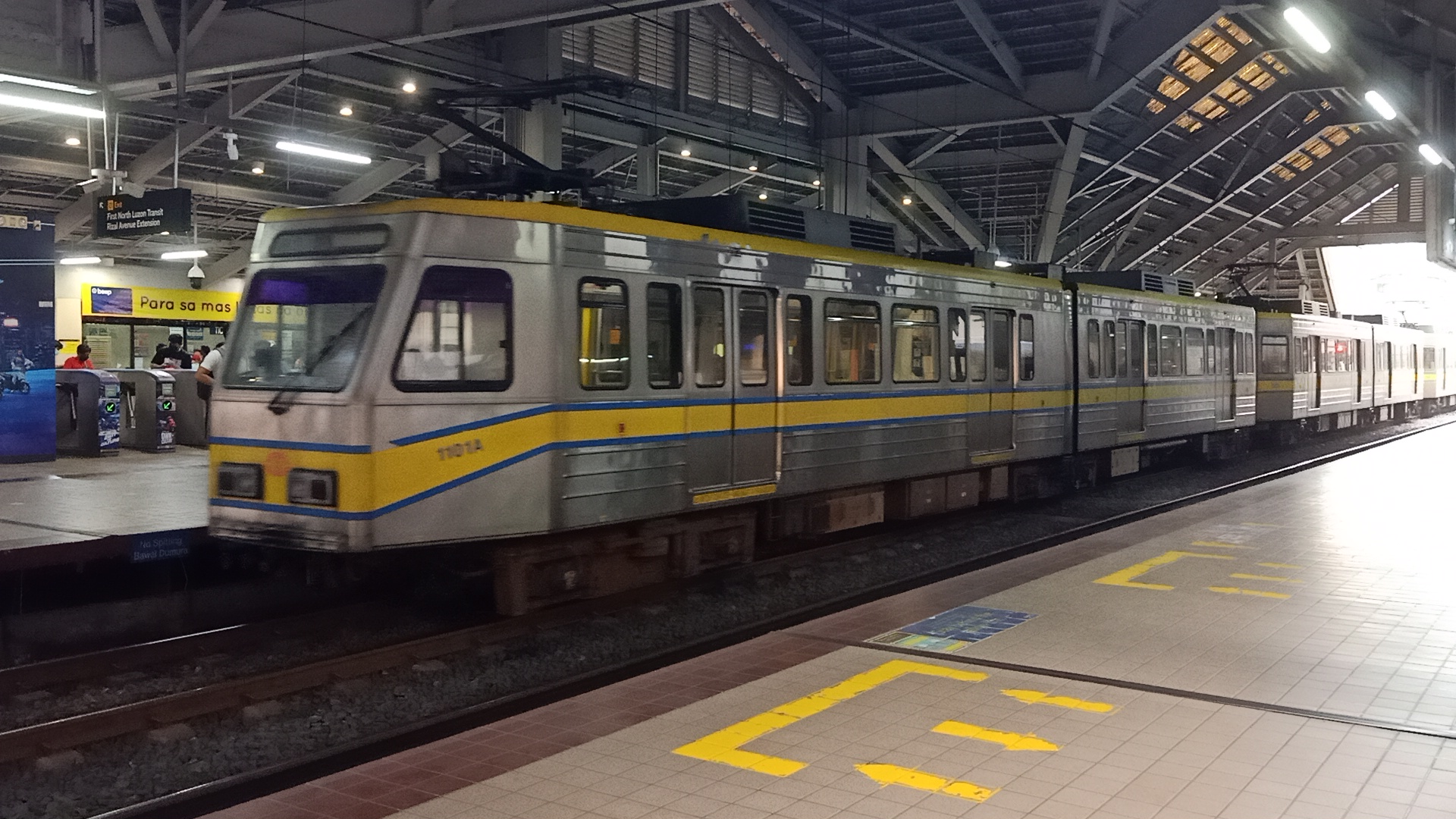
- A 1100 class train at Monumento, December 2021
- Stock type: Light rail vehicle
- In service: 1999–2024
- Manufacturers: Hyundai Precision & Industries; Adtranz (later Bombardier Transportation, Alstom)
- Assembly: Changwon, South Korea
- Constructed: 1997–1998
- Refurbished: 2019–2020
- Number built: 28 vehicles (7 sets)
- Number in service: None
- Number retired: 4 vehicles
- Formation: 4 cars per trainset (Mc–M–M–Mc)
- Fleet numbers: 1101–1128
- Capacity: 1,358 per train (320 seats)
- Operators: LRTA (1999–2015); LRMC (2015–present)
- Depot: Baclaran
- Line served: Line 1

Specifications
- Car body construction: Stainless steel
- Train length: 105.7 m (346 ft 9 27/64 in)
- Car length: 26.35 m (86 ft 5 13/32 in) (Mc); 26.5 m (86 ft 11 5/16 in) (M)
- Width: 2.59 m (8 ft 5 31/32 in)
- Height: 3.95 m (12 ft 11 33/64 in)
- Floor height: 0.92 m (3 ft 7/32 in)
- Platform height: 0.69 m (2 ft 3 11/64 in)
- Doors: Double-leaf pocket-type; 4 per side 1.5 m × 1.9 m (59 in × 75 in)
- Articulated sections: 2
- Wheel diameter: 660–600 mm (26–24 in) (new–worn)
- Wheelbase: 2.31 m (7 ft 6 15/16 in)
- Maximum speed: 60 km/h (37 mph)
- Weight: 37.4 t (82,000 lb) (Mc); 36.5 t (80,000 lb) (M)
- Axle load: 10.7 t (24,000 lb)
- Traction system: Adtranz IGBT–VVVF (as built); Voith IGBT–VVVF (refurbished)
- Traction motors: 4 × 3-phase AC induction: As built: 125 kW (168 hp); Refurbished: 170 kW (230 hp)
- Power output: As built: 500 kW (670 hp) per LRV; 2 MW (2,700 hp) (4 cars); Refurbished: 680 kW (910 hp) per LRV; 2.72 MW (3,650 hp) (4 cars)
- Acceleration: 1.1 m/s^{2} (3.61 ft/s^{2})
- Deceleration: 1.3 m/s^{2} (4.27 ft/s^{2}) (service); 2.08 m/s^{2} (6.82 ft/s^{2}) (emergency)
- Auxiliaries: 2 × Static inverter
- HVAC: Roof-mounted duct-type air conditioning
- Electric systems: 750 V DC overhead catenary
- Current collection: Single-arm pantograph
- UIC classification: Bo′+2′+Bo′
- Bogies: FLEXX Metro 1000
- Minimum turning radius: 25 m (82 ft 0 in)
- Braking systems: Knorr-Bremse regenerative and electro-pneumatic
- Safety systems: ACEC fixed block relay-type ATS (1999–2007); Siemens fixed block ATP/ATS (2007–2022); Alstom Atlas 100 ETCS-1 with subsystem of ATP (2022–present)
- Coupling system: Semi-permanent
- Track gauge: 1,435 mm (4 ft 8 1/2 in) standard gauge

Notes/references
- Sourced from unless otherwise noted.

The LRTA 1100 class is the second-generation class of high-floor light rail vehicles of Manila's LRT Line 1. The trains were purchased in 1996 as part of a capacity expansion project funded by official development assistance (ODA) loans from Japan.

Entering service in 1999, many vehicles were taken out of service due to lack of spare parts. The trains subsequently underwent re-engineering and refurbishment by Voith from 2019 to 2020. By 2024, all LRTA 1100 class trains were eventually supplanted by the succeeding LRTA 1200 and LRTA 13000 class trainsets.

== History ==
=== Background and purchase ===
By 1990, the LRT Line 1 in Metro Manila reached its capacity, necessitating the need for capacity expansion. The project, launched in 1994 and undertaken at a cost of ₱4.1 billion, was one of the flagship projects of the administration of President Fidel V. Ramos. Initially, 32 cars with identical specifications to the 1000 class trains were planned to be ordered for the 32 two-car trains operating at the time so that each train would consist of three cars. However, with the increasing transport demand, four-car trains were considered instead.

In February 1996, four bidders were submitted to build the new trainsets. These are a consortium of Marubeni Corporation, Adtranz, and ABB; GEC Alsthom (now Alstom); a consortium of Mitsui and Siemens; and a consortium of Mitsubishi Corporation and Construcciones y Auxiliar de Ferrocarriles. Mitsubishi and CAF would go on to build the fourth-generation train sets as part of the Cavite Extension Project. In August of that year, the Marubeni-Adtranz-ABB consortium was awarded the contract and was signed the following September. On October 18, Hyundai Precision signed a contract to produce 28 cars (7 sets) for the LRT Line 1. These cars were produced between 1997 and 1998 as its first manufactured light rail vehicle.

=== Commissioning and later decline ===
The handover ceremony and test-run of the 1100 series LRV was done with former President Joseph Estrada and former Vice-President Gloria Macapagal Arroyo in 1999. These trains raised the line's capacity by half from a carrying capacity of 18,000 passengers per hour per direction to 27,000 passengers per hour per direction.

After 2001, many vehicles left the service owing to problems in operations and maintenance. Although spare parts had been substantially given in 2004, 14 cars remained out-of-service due to the lack thereof as of 2013, including two cars involved in a collision. Most of the spare parts for the trains, including brake parts, were only procurable from Adtranz. There were attempts to procure spare parts, but these attempts failed. This was affected by the acquisition of Adtranz by Bombardier Transportation in 2001 (later acquired by Alstom in 2021). Furthermore, parts in the 1200 class and the 1100 class only share 20% commonality.

In addition, these trainsets were, until 2020, used as "skip trains" or trains meant to target a particular station due to extremely high volume of passengers, especially during rush hours.

A 1100 class trainset was used for the first test run of the LRT Line 1 Cavite Extension Phase 1 on December 19, 2023. According to the Light Rail Manila Corporation (LRMC), the 1100 class is the widest in terms of car body, making it the most strategic option to check for initial compatibility of station platforms, walkways, cableways, and others.

=== Refurbishment ===
Refurbishment of the second-generation trains was initiated by LRMC in February 2018, which aimed to restore the inactive fleet into serviceable conditions and increase the capacity of Line 1. LRMC and Voith signed an agreement to refurbish the said fleet which includes the control devices, traction systems, and automatic diagnostic displays of main circuits. The refurbishment was carried out between 2019 and 2020 and six out of seven sets returned to operation with an extended vehicle life. The remaining unrepaired set is in the Santolan Depot of LRT-2, due to the ongoing expansion of the Line 1 depot.

== Design ==
The 1100 class are the first 6-axle (3-bogie) light rail vehicles with two articulated cars in the entire rolling stock of the LRT Line 1, as its predecessor, the 1000 class, was built to the 8-axle (4-bogie) design with three sections.

=== Car body ===
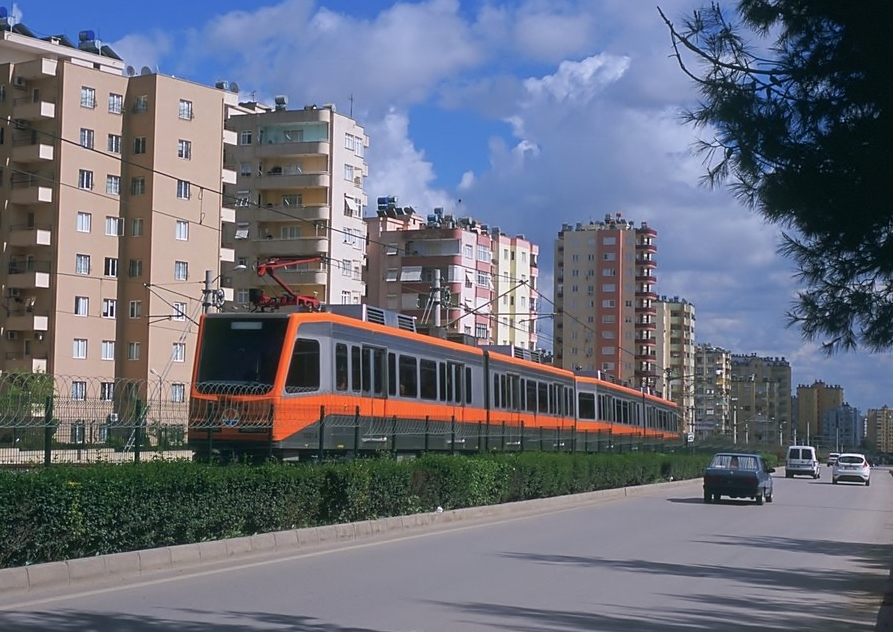
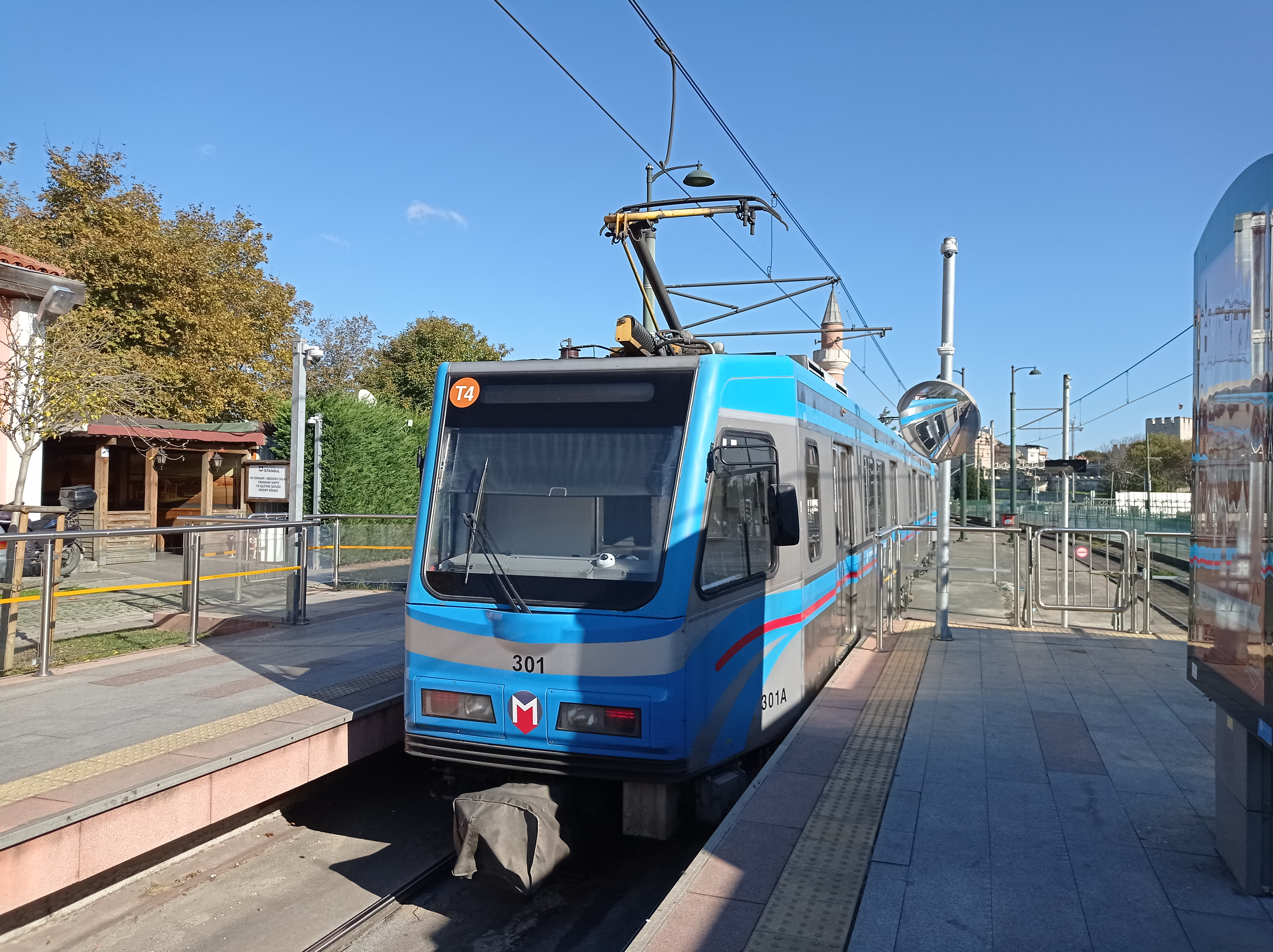
The 1100 class trains resemble those of Adana Metro (top) and the LRV34 trains of Istanbul Tram Line T4 (above). Both trains were manufactured by Hyundai Precision's successor, Hyundai Rotem.

The train car body is made of stainless steel, sporting a silver body with yellow and blue cheatlines. Each LRV has four sliding pocket-type doors per side. The 1100 class trains are 90 millimeters (3.5 inches) wider than the 1000 class.

Similar to the 1000 class, the 1100 class have cheatlines of blue and yellow that run through its sides. The trains also served as a prototype for future LRVs made by Hyundai Precision, which bears resemblance to the trains used in the Adana Metro and the Hyundai Rotem LRV34 trains of the Line T4 of the Istanbul Tram.

Each light rail vehicle has two roof-mounted air-conditioning units. In total, there are eight air-conditioning units in a four-car train set.

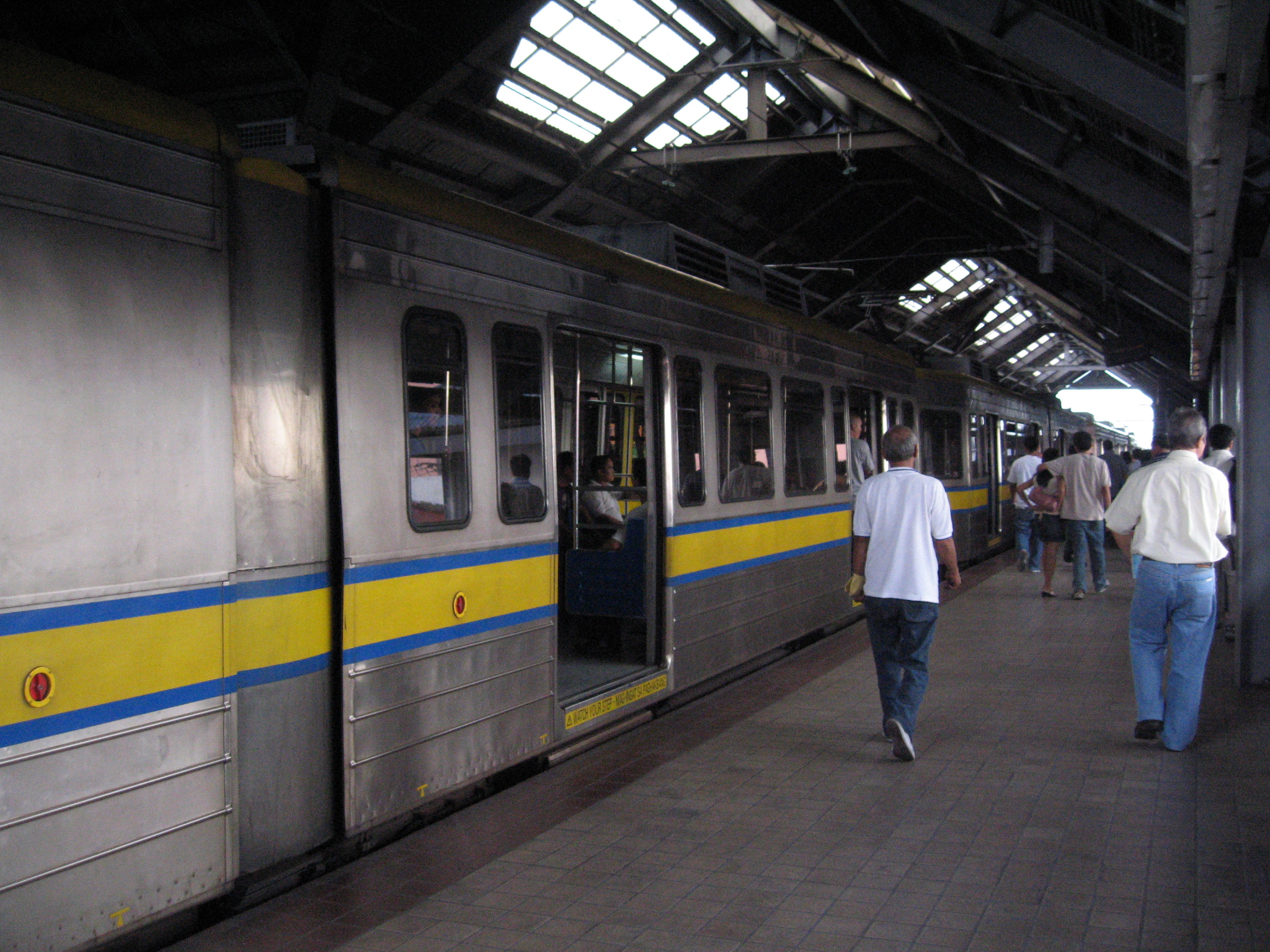
1100 class train at Gil Puyat station in November 2006

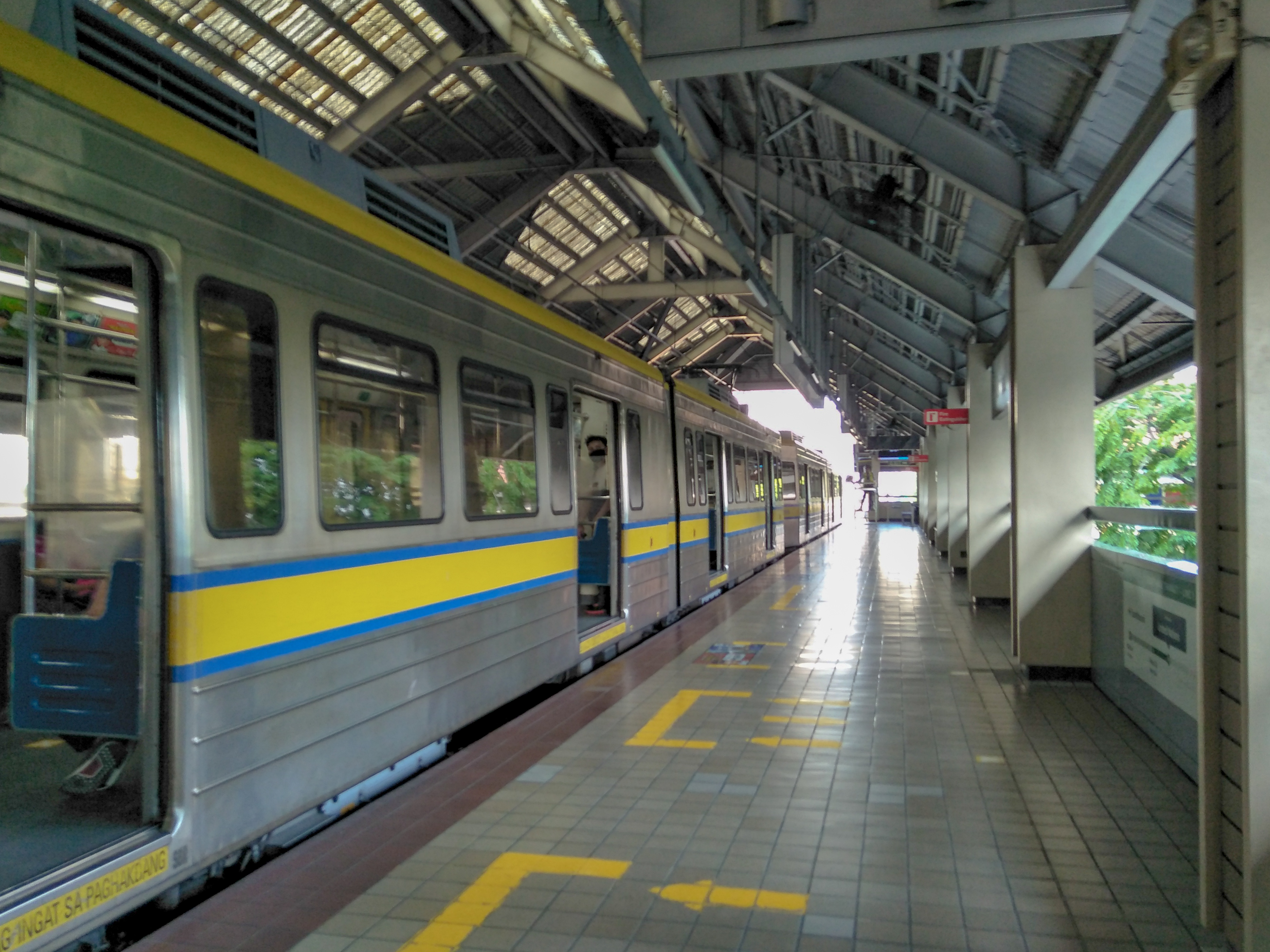
1100 class train at United Nations station in June 2020

=== Interior ===
The trains have longitudinal seating. A wheelchair provision is present near the articulated portion of the intermediate cars.

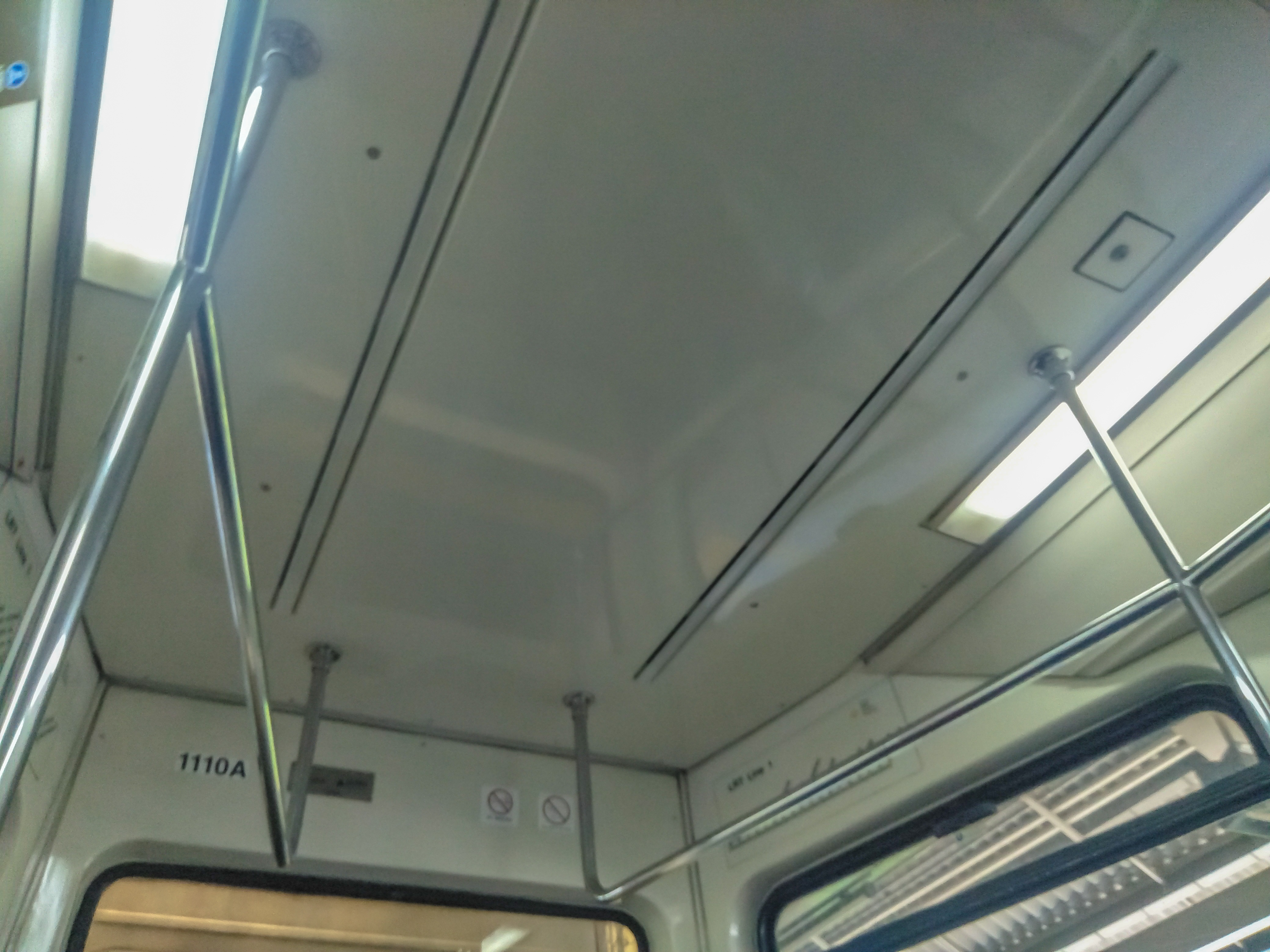
Image shows stanchions, ACU vents, and briefly, the builders' plate

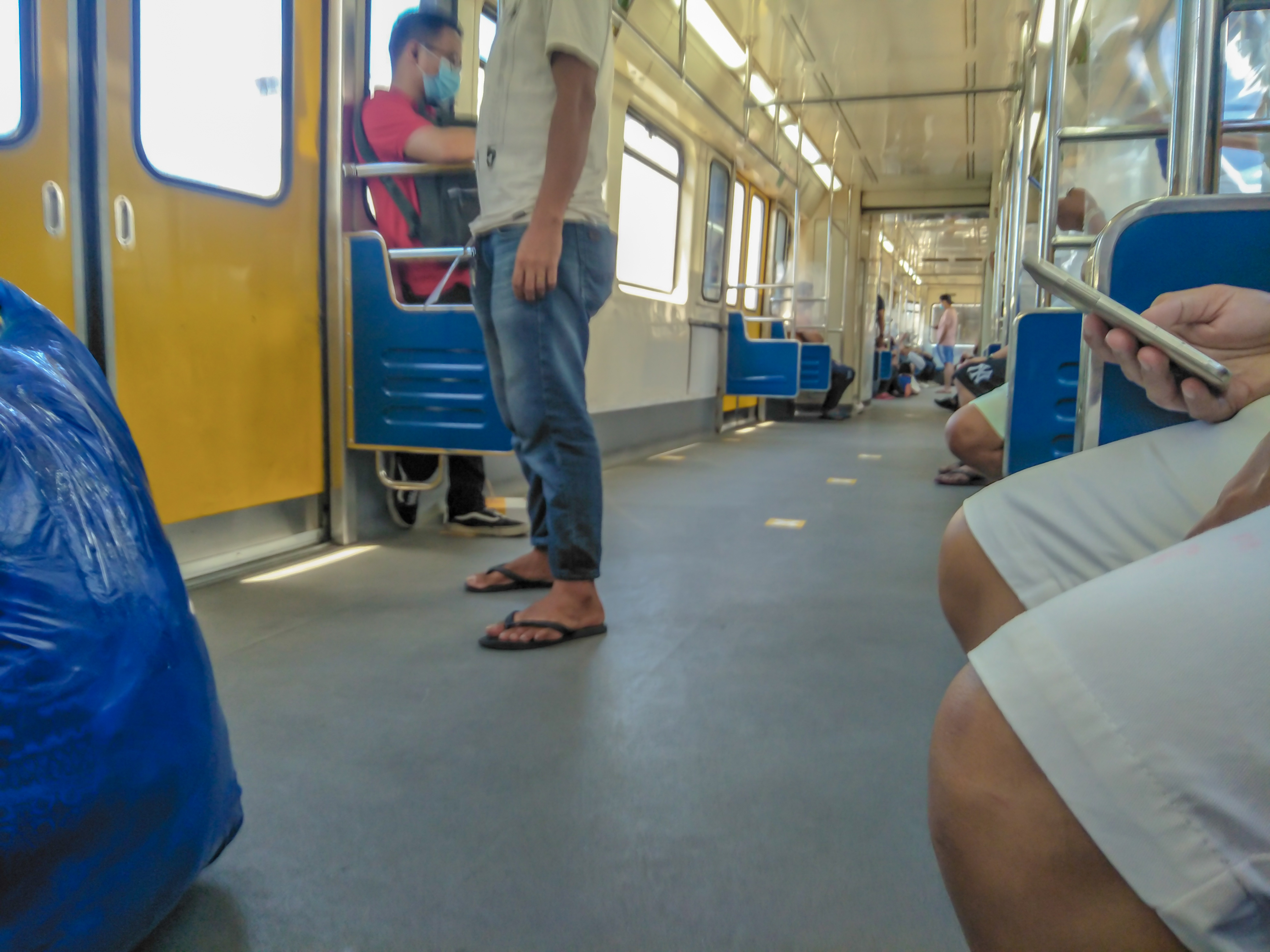
1100 class train with seats removed, showing wheelchair space

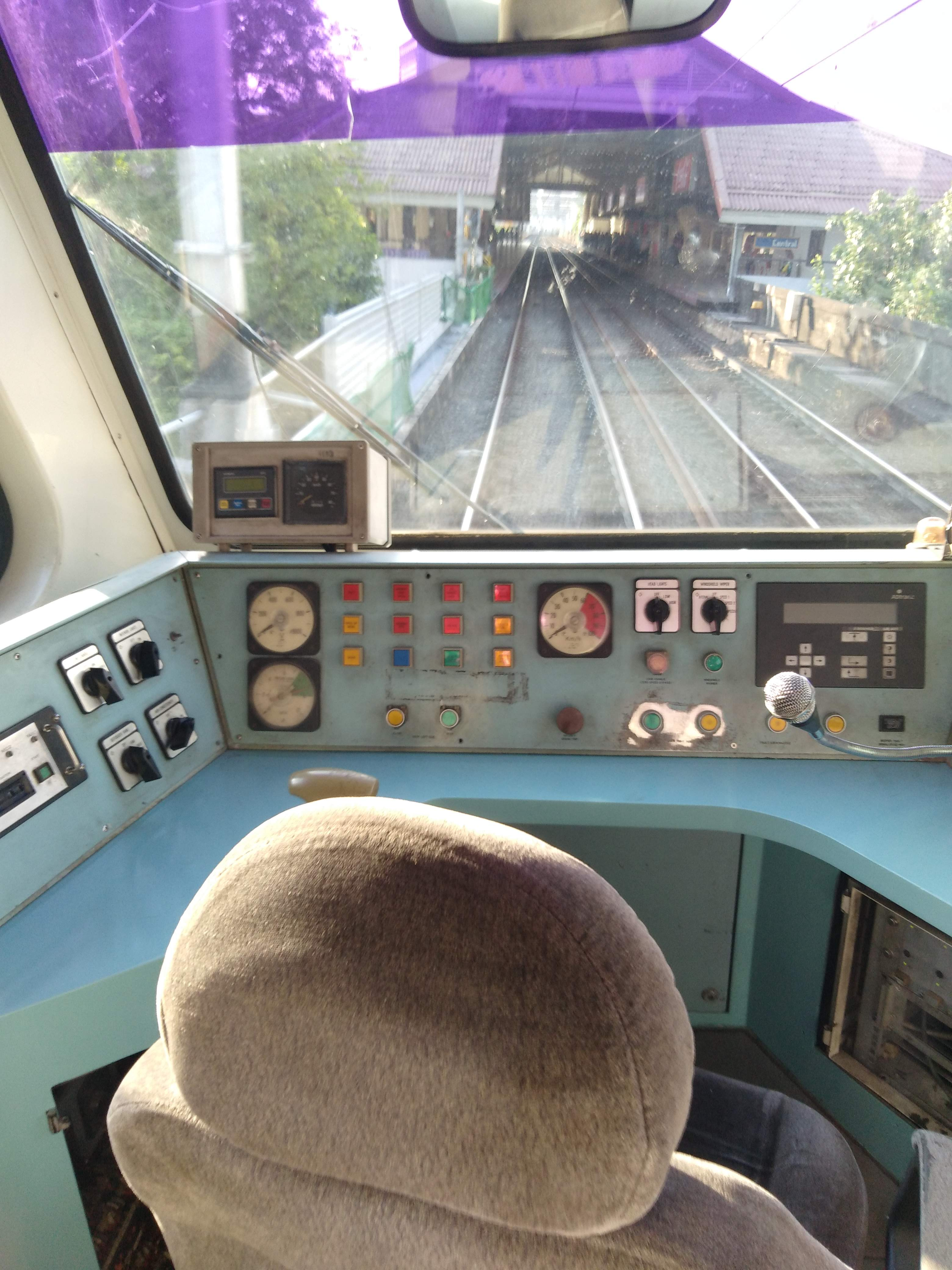
View of driving cab before refurbishment

=== Electrical ===
The 1100 class trains are the first Line 1 trains to have a propulsion system controlled by variable-voltage/variable frequency drive (VVVF) inverters with insulated-gate bipolar transistors (IGBT). The two inverters drive the four 3-phase alternating current, enclosed-type induction motors. Adtranz supplied the original electrical components, while Voith installed the new components. The traction equipment in a refurbished train consists of two Voith EmCon I1000-9AU traction inverters with 350 kilovolt-amperes continuous power in each, two auxiliary static inverters, and a VPort IO control unit.

Prior to refurbishment, the trains produced a distinct high-pitched acceleration sound unique to the Adtranz VVVF controller used, a trait present in the train's derivative models. After refurbishment, the traction acceleration sound is now identical to the one used in the MRTC 3100 class trains, as its traction controller is manufactured by Voith as well.

=== Mechanical ===
Each LRV has three outside-frame bogies consisting of two motorized bogies at the ends of the LRV and one trailer bogie under the articulation. Unlike other trains, which have a bogie wheelbase of 1.9 meters (6 ft 3 in), the long, 2.31-meter (7 ft 7 in) wheelbases of the 1100 class trains has caused restricted access to some tracks at the Baclaran Depot. The primary suspension is a chevron rubber spring, while the secondary suspension is an air suspension, similar to the 1200 class. Semi-permanent couplers are present in the ends of each light rail vehicle except the driving cab section of the MC car.

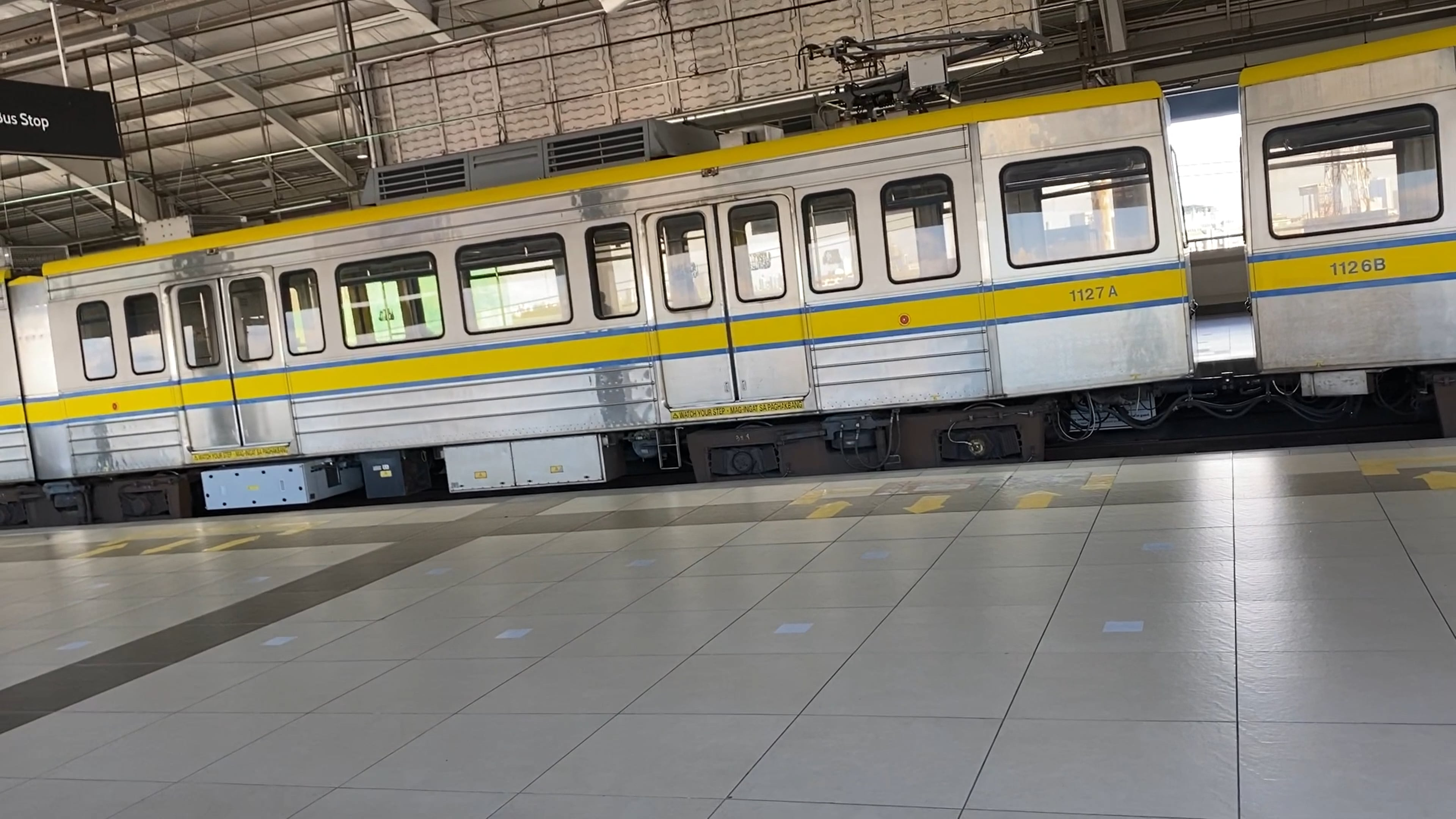
New underfloor traction equipment (Voith), outside-frame bogie and pantograph of a refurbished 1100 class. Semi-permanent couplers can also be seen on the right.

== Train formation ==
The configuration of a four-car trainset is Mc–M–M–Mc. Mc denotes a driving car while M denotes an intermediate car.

Cars of 1100 class
Car type		Mc		M	
Car type		A-car	B-car	A-car	B-car
Quantity		2		2	
Control cab		Yes	No	No	No
VVVF inverter		Yes	Yes	Yes	Yes
Auxiliary inverter		Yes	Yes	Yes	Yes
Pantograph		Yes	No	Yes	No
Car length	m	26.35		26.5	
Car length	ft in	86 ft 5 13/32 in		86 ft 11 5/16 in	
Capacity	Seated	78		82	
Capacity	Standing	252		267	
Capacity	Total	330		349	

== Incidents ==
- On August 30, 2012, 5:50 AM. A 1100 class train with the unit 1113A was involved after a woman committed suicide on EDSA station
- Two 1100 class trains, LRVs 1107 and 1120, collided at Baclaran Depot. LRV 1120, however, was subsequently repaired and refurbished in 2019.
- On November 27, 2017, a 1100 class train door malfunctioned after a passenger forcibly opened it at Vito Cruz station, causing the sensor to malfunction. The train continued its journey with the door left open, and a passenger recorded this incident on camera.
- On April 19, 2023, a 1100 class train stopped between Roosevelt and Balintawak Station. The 1100 class was coupled to a 1000 class train to be brought back to Baclaran Depot.
- On August 24, 2023, a 1100 class train derailed near Baclaran Station. Efforts took the entire day to remove the train, necessitating track repairs. As a result, provisional services were implemented between Fernando Poe Jr. and Gil Puyat stations, scheduled for the upcoming weekend until August 27. Fortunately, the repairs were completed ahead of schedule and certified on August 26, enabling the line to resume regular operations.

== See also ==
- Adana Metro
- T4 (Istanbul Tram)
- LRTA 1000 class
- LRTA 1200 class
- LRTA 13000 class

== Sources ==
- Department of Transportation and Communications; Light Rail Transit Authority (June 4, 2012). MANILA LRT1 EXTENSION, OPERATIONS AND MAINTENANCE PROJECT (PDF) (Report).
- Japan International Cooperation Agency; Oriental Consultants Co., Ltd.; ALMEC Corporation; Katahira & Engineers International; Tonichi Engineering Consultants, Inc. (July 2013). Study on railway strategy for enhancement of railway network system in Metro Manila of the Republic of the Philippines: Final report, Vol.1-LRT Line 1: Cavite extension project (2013) (PDF) (Report). Archived (PDF) from the original on December 27, 2021.
- Japan International Cooperation Agency; Oriental Consultants Co., Ltd.; ALMEC Corporation; Katahira & Engineers International; Tonichi Engineering Consultants, Inc. (July 2013b). Study on railway strategy for enhancement of railway network system in Metro Manila of the Republic of the Philippines: Final report, Vol.1 LRT Line 1: Cavite extension project (2013) (PDF) (Report). Archived (PDF) from the original on December 27, 2021.
- Japan International Cooperation Agency (2004). Metro Manila LRT Line 1 Capacity Expansion Project (PDF) (Report).
- Korea Railroad 100 Years Compilation Committee (1999). 1.11.2 경전철 차량 (LeRV : LIGHT ELECTRIC RAIL VEHICLE). hangug cheoldochalyang 100nyeonsa 한국철도차량100년사 [Korea Railroad 100–Year History] (PDF) (in Korean). Railway Vehicle Technology Review Team, Korea. pp. 1209–1218. Archived (PDF) from the original on December 5, 2021.
- Japan International Cooperation Agency (October 2010). Ex-Post Monitoring Report of Japanese ODA Loan Projects 2009 (Philippines) (PDF) (Report). Archived from the original (PDF) on January 24, 2013.
- Light Rail Transit Authority (2006). "PROCUREMENT PLAN 2006 LRV ROLLING STOCK MECHANICAL/ELECTRICAL SPARE PARTS IMPORTED ITEMS" (PDF). Archived from the original (PDF) on April 30, 2006.
- Light Rail Transit Authority (2006). "PROCUREMENT PLAN 2007 LRV ROLLING STOCK MECHANICAL/ELECTRICAL SPARE PARTS IMPORTED ITEMS" (PDF). Archived from the original (PDF) on August 28, 2008.
- Bombardier Transportation (2020). "FLEXX Metro Bogies - The pulse of cities" (PDF). Archived from the original (PDF) on February 19, 2020.
