= Las Piñas station =

Proposed rail station in Manila, Philippines

Las Piñas

General information
- Other names: Diego Cera
- Location: Pulang Lupa Uno, Las Piñas
- System: Manila Light Rail Transit System
- Owner: Light Rail Transit Authority
- Line: Line 1

History
- Opening: 2031

Services
Preceding station	Manila LRT	Following station
Dr. Santos towards Fernando Poe Jr.	LRT Line 1	Zapote towards Niog

Las Piñas station is a proposed Light Rail Transit (LRT) station located on the LRT Line 1 (LRT-1) system in Las Piñas. It is part of the LRT-1 South Extension Project. It is one of two proposed LRT-1 stations in Las Piñas, the other being Manuyo Uno.

== History ==
Las Piñas station was first planned as part of the Line 1 South Extension plan, which calls for a mostly elevated extension of approximately 11.7 kilometers (7.3 mi). The extension will have 8 passenger stations with an option for 2 future stations (Manuyo Uno and Talaba). The project was first approved on August 25, 2000, and the implementing agreement for the project was approved on January 22, 2002. However, construction for the extension was repeatedly delayed until the project was shelved years later.

The plans for the southern extension project were restarted as early as 2012 during the Aquino administration and was expected to begin construction in 2014, but was delayed due to right of way issues. The issues were resolved in 2016 and the project broke ground on May 4, 2017. Meanwhile, construction works on the south extension began on May 7, 2019, after the right of way acquisitions were cleared.

On November 15, 2024, Phase 1 of the LRT Line 1 Extension, which runs between Redemptorist and Dr. Santos, was inaugurated; the LRMC management announced the start of its commercial operations to be on the following day. Meanwhile, Phases 2 and 3 will begin operations by 2031 as challenges hindered their completion with the delays in the acquisition of right of way.

In mid-2026, acting Transportation Secretary Giovanni Lopez proposed to bypass the Las Piñas station amid right-of-way disputes with the Villar Group of Companies. Las Piñas Representative Mark Anthony Santos argued that dismantling the nearby C-5–Quirino Flyover built during Mark Villar's tenure as Secretary of Public Works and Highways is the most practical solution to clear the blocked track alignment and strongly opposed the bypass, urging the Department of Transportation to complete the original design. On August 7, 2026, the Villar Group of Companies reportedly donated parcels of land for the station's construction.

== See also ==
- List of Manila LRT and MRT stations
- Manila Light Rail Transit System
