= LRMC =

LRMC can refer to:

- Long-run marginal cost
- Landstuhl Regional Medical Center, a U.S. Army post and hospital in southwest Germany
- Light Rail Manila Corporation, the private operator of Manila Light Rail Transit System Line 1 or LRT-1
