= Zapote station =

Proposed train station in Bacoor, Philippines

Zapote
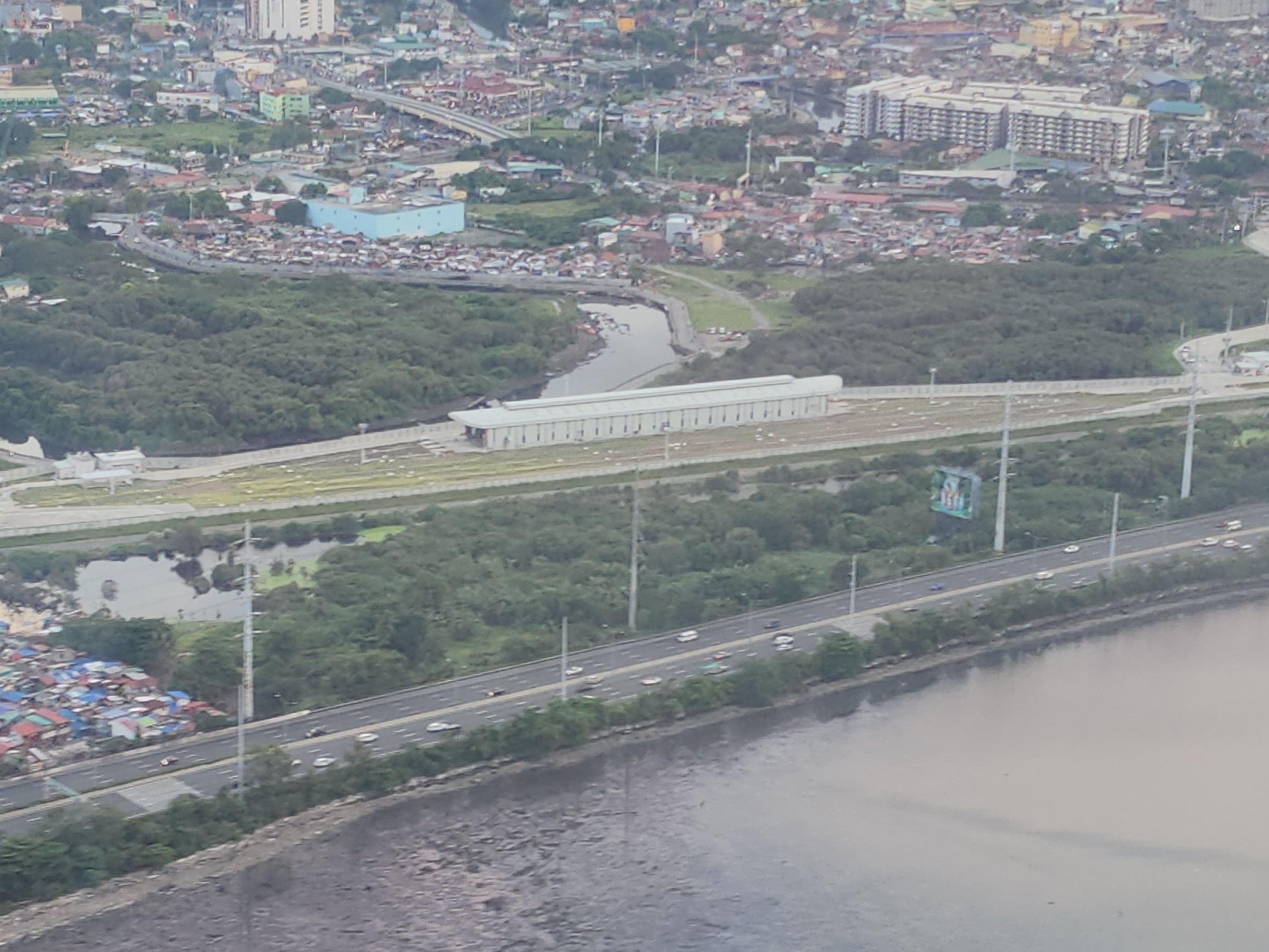
- Aerial view of the site of the Zapote station and satellite depot in 2024

General information
- Location: Barangay Zapote V, Bacoor, Cavite
- Coordinates: 14°28′19″N 120°58′03″E
- System: Manila Light Rail Transit System
- Owner: Light Rail Transit Authority
- Line: Line 1

Construction
- Structure type: At-grade

History
- Opening: 2031

Services
Preceding station	Manila LRT	Following station
Las Piñas towards Fernando Poe Jr.	LRT Line 1	Talaba towards Niog
Location

Zapote station is a proposed Light Rail Transit (LRT) station on Line 1 of the LRT in Bacoor, Cavite. The station will be located at the line’s Zapote Satellite Depot. Unlike other stations on Line 1, Zapote station will be constructed at grade. It is part of the LRT-1 South Extension Project and is expected to be the first LRT-1 station located outside Metro Manila.

== History ==
Zapote station was first planned as part of the Line 1 South Extension plan, which calls for a mostly elevated extension of approximately 11.7 kilometers (7.3 mi). The extension will have eight passenger stations, with an option for two future stations (Manuyo Uno and Talaba). The project was first approved on August 25, 2000, and the implementing agreement was approved on January 22, 2002. However, construction of the extension was repeatedly delayed, and the project was eventually shelved.

Plans for the southern extension were revived as early as 2012 during the Benigno Aquino III administration and were expected to begin construction in 2014, but were delayed due to right of way issues. These issues were resolved in 2016, and the project broke ground on May 4, 2017. Construction work on the South Extension began on May 7, 2019, after right-of-way acquisitions were cleared.

On November 15, 2024, Phase 1 of the LRT Line 1 Extension, which runs between Redemptorist and Dr. Santos, was inaugurated; LRMC management announced that commercial operations would begin the following day. Phases 2 and 3 are expected to begin operations by 2031, as challenges—particularly delays in right-of-way acquisition—have hindered their completion.

== See also ==
- List of Manila LRT and MRT stations
- Manila Light Rail Transit System
