= Vito Cruz station (LRT) =

Train station in Manila, Philippines

Coordinates: 14°33′48.51″N 120°59′40.85″E

| Vito Cruz | GL17 |
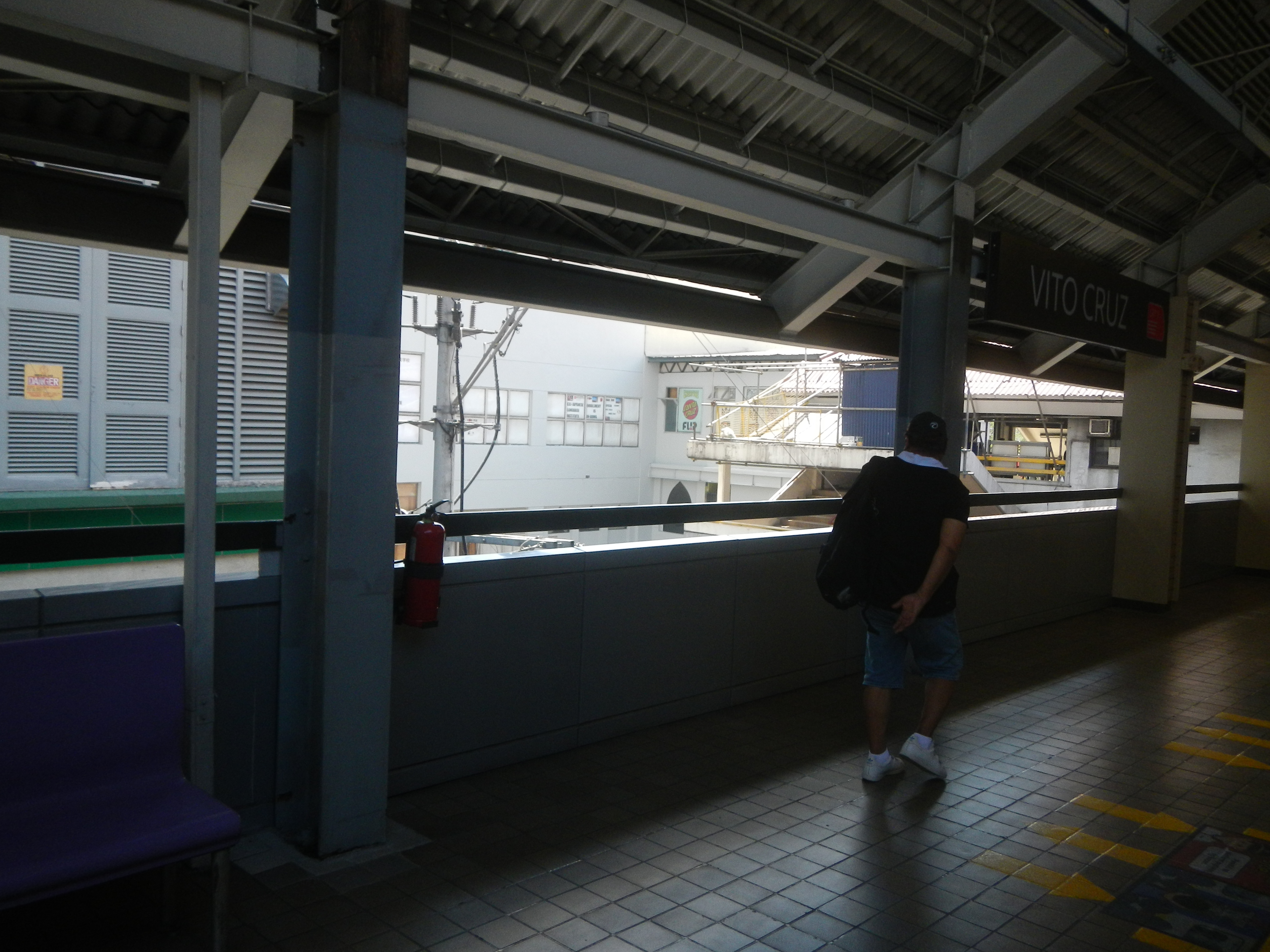

General information
- Location: Taft Avenue, Malate; Manila, Metro Manila, Philippines
- Owner: Department of Transportation – Light Rail Transit Authority
- Operator: Light Rail Manila Corporation
- Line: LRT Line 1
- Platforms: 2 (2 side)
- Tracks: 2

Construction
- Structure type: Elevated
- Parking: Yes (University Mall & Vista Taft)

History
- Opened: December 1, 1984; 41 years ago

Services
| Preceding station | Manila LRT | Following station |
|---|---|---|
| Quirino towards Fernando Poe Jr. | LRT Line 1 | Gil Puyat towards Dr. Santos |
Track layout
Location
- Location within Manila Location within Metro Manila Location within Luzon Location within Philippines

Vito Cruz station is an elevated Light Rail Transit (LRT) station located on the LRT Line 1 (LRT-1) system in Malate, Manila. It is the first station going north and the last station going south to lie within Manila city bounds. It is also the tenth station for trains headed to Fernando Poe Jr. and the sixteenth station for trains headed to Dr. Santos. The station takes its name from the old name of the nearby Pablo Ocampo Street, which was named after Hermogenes Vito Cruz, a former alcalde mayor of Pineda (present-day Pasay) c. 1871.

== History ==
The station was opened to the public on December 1, 1984, as part of LRT's inaugural southern section, known as the Taft Line.

== Nearby landmarks ==
The station is near some major landmarks, such as the Bangko Sentral ng Pilipinas complex, the University Mall shopping center, and the Rizal Memorial Sports Complex. The Cultural Center of the Philippines Complex is near this station as well, although commute is also an option due to its distance. Located in this complex are the CCP Main Building, the Philippine International Convention Center, Folk Arts Theater, Manila Film Center, MBC Building, Star City, Aliw Theater and the Harbour Square.

The station is also close to some educational institutions, such as the main campus of Arellano University School of Law, De La Salle University, De La Salle–College of Saint Benilde, and St. Scholastica's College. The southbound concourse of the station is connected to the adjacent University Mall, but is currently blocked off as the entrance has since been converted into tenant space. The station was also near Harrison Plaza, which was demolished for a redevelopment by SM Prime.

== Transportation links ==
Buses serving the Taft Avenue route, taxis, jeepneys, UV Express, and pedicabs stop near the station. Some destinations, such as St. Scholastica's College, are within walking distance from the station. There is also a Philippine National Railways station of the same name, although the station is far from the station, requiring a commute from the station.

== Incidents ==
Vito Cruz station is notorious for its unusually high number of suicide attempts. As a result, the LRTA has imposed a "speed limit" on trains entering stations to deter the number of successful suicides.
