= Malvar station =

Proposed train station in Caloocan, Philippines

Coordinates: 14°39′25.93″N 120°59′35.32″E

Malvar

General information
- Other names: Gen. Malvar
- Location: 317 Epifanio de los Santos Avenue corner General Malvar Street, Brgy. 136 Zone 12, Bagong Barrio West, Caloocan
- Line: LRT Line 1
- Tracks: 2
- Connections: Bus, Taxi

Construction
- Structure type: Elevated
Location

Malvar LRT station, also known as Gen. Malvar station, is a proposed but shelved station on the Manila LRT Line 1 under the North Extension Project. The station will be located on the intersection of Epifanio de los Santos Avenue and General Malvar Street in Bagong Barrio, Caloocan. Once built, it will between the Monumento and Balintawak stations.

It is the first planned infill station of Line 1.

== History ==
The station, as Gen. Malvar, was initially planned as an intermediate station of EDSA North Transit (ENT) Link Stage 1. The line is a separate project that would have linked the MRT Line 3's terminus at North Avenue station with the LRT Line 1 and PNR North Main Line in Caloocan. During that time, no rail lines operated along the northern section of EDSA.

In September 2008, Caloocan Mayor Enrico Echiverri urged a petition for an additional station to be constructed at the corner of EDSA and Malvar Street in Bagong Barrio. Studies by Caloocan's City Planning and Development Department showed that the Monumento station would be congested once the line extension project is completed. The studies estimated that around 500,000 commuters from the CAMANAVA (Caloocan-Malabon-Navotas-Valenzuela) area will benefit from the additional station. The study also added that the station would create economic opportunities for the Bagong Barrio area, as it is a priority development area.

On November 3, 2008, residents of Caloocan blocked a section of EDSA as they staged a rally in order to urge the national government to push through with the Bagong Barrio station proposal. The Light Rail Transit Authority announced afterwards that an additional station in Bagong Barrio is not viable. A previous study performed by the LRTA revealed that should the station be built, it will lose 200 million pesos a year. In addition, it would also involve a time-consuming and costly redesign of the project. The Caloocan city government later declared that it would not release the necessary permits for construction in the Caloocan area should the Bagong Barrio Station proposal be rejected. In January 2009, the National Government approved the proposal of the Caloocan government for the additional station.

== Current status ==
In a project update, the LRTA has designated the Bagong Barrio station as Malvar station. The feasibility study for the station was concluded on 22 December 2010. However, bidding for the station is yet to be scheduled.

There are currently no updates pertaining to this proposed station, reportedly shelved by the Benigno Aquino III administration. It was later revived by the Bongbong Marcos administration, along with the pending completion of Cavite extension phases 2 and 3.

== See also ==
- List of rail transit stations in Metro Manila
- Manila Light Rail Transit System
