= LRT Line 6 =

Proposed Manila metro line

Overview
- Status: Proposed
- Owner: Light Rail Transit Authority
- Locale: Cavite
- Termini: Niog; Pala-Pala
- Stations: 8 (Note: Up to 48 proposed stations, with only 8 in the main line.)

Service
- Type: Rapid transit
- System: Manila Light Rail Transit System
- Services: 5
- Rolling stock: Electric multiple units
- Daily ridership: 200,000 (2015 estimate)

History
- Planned opening: 2027 (partial)

Technical
- Line length: 23.5 km (14.6 mi) (Note: System length is at 86 km (53 mi).)
- Number of tracks: Double-track
- Character: Elevated
- Track gauge: 1,435 mm (4 ft 8 1/2 in) standard gauge
- Minimum radius: 50 m (160 ft)
- Electrification: 750 V DC overhead lines
- Operating speed: 70 km/h (43 mph)

LRT Line 6, officially the Light Rail Transit Line 6, is a proposed rapid transit system in Cavite, Philippines. There have been two proposals for the line; the initial proposal was shelved in 2018. A separate proposal emerged in 2017 and was submitted for review by the National Economic and Development Authority (NEDA).

== Background and history ==
Cavite is a "bedroom community" for many people who work in Metro Manila. LRT Line 6 is intended to provide rail transport access to areas where 45 percent of Cavite's population is concentrated, including the cities of Bacoor, Imus, and Dasmariñas.

=== Early trains in Cavite ===
Trains operated by the Manila Railroad Company previously ran on the Naic line from Paco station in Manila to Naic station in Naic, Cavite. The commuter rail line was opened in 1909 under the Insular Government Act No. 1905. It had 19 stations over 44 km (27 mi) of track. There was also a branch line to Cavite City, which branched off at Noveleta. Some trains passed through the towns of Parañaque and Las Piñas in Manila, as well as Bacoor in Cavite. The line ceased operations by 1936, and much of it was built over in later decades, including during the expansion of Nichols Field. Some of the historical right-of-way is now shared between the Colonel Jesus Villamor Air Base and Ninoy Aquino International Airport.

=== 1990s proposal ===
In 1993, under the Updated Traffic and Transport Management Plan, a network of five LRT lines was proposed, including a sixth line that would run 8 kilometers (5.0 mi) from Baclaran to Zapote in Las Piñas. The project was jointly proposed by the Public Estates Authority (PEA, now the Philippine Reclamation Authority), while Australia-based TGM completed the pre-feasibility study in 1997.

The project was also identified in the Metro Manila Urban Transportation Integration Study by the Japan International Cooperation Agency in 1999.

=== LRT Line 1 Cavite extension ===
In 2004, Canadian firm SNC-Lavalin proposed an extension of the existing Line 1 to Cavite. However, the Arroyo administration rejected the study in 2005. In 2012, the LRT Line 1 south extension project was approved as a public-private partnership project. The project was intended to extend the line to Bacoor, Cavite, with construction targeted to begin in 2014 and operations planned for mid-2015. However, the bidding process failed, and the government repeatedly postponed the project starting in 2013. Construction of the LRT Line 1 Cavite extension began in 2019. Phase 1 of the extension opened on November 16, 2024, and the full extension is targeted to become operational by 2031.

=== First Line 6 proposal ===
A separate LRT Line 6 in Cavite was approved by then-president Benigno Aquino III after a National Economic and Development Authority board meeting on September 6, 2015. The project was estimated to cost PHP64 billion or US$1.42 billion. In December 2015, the Department of Transportation and Communications, later the Department of Transportation, began the bidding process by inviting interested firms to bid on the project. However, the bidding process was repeatedly delayed in 2016 after deadlines were extended several times.

Sixteen firms expressed interest in the LRT Line 6 project by sending representatives to a pre-qualification conference in February 2016: Aboitiz Equity Ventures, Inc.; Ayala Corporation; Bombardier; CFP Transaction Advisors; Daelim Industrial Company Ltd (now DL E&C); DMCI; Egis; First Metro Investments Corporation; Metro Builders Corporation; Metro Pacific Investments; Mott MacDonald; Ove Arup & Partners; Prime Asset Ventures, Inc.; Robinsons Land; San Miguel Corporation; and SYSTRA.

The first proposal was described as a 19 km (12 mi) commuter rail line along the Aguinaldo Highway. It would have started from Niog station, separate from the Line 1 station, and the two lines would not have shared tracks. The next stations would have been Tirona, Imus, and Daang Hari in Imus, followed by Salitran, Congressional Avenue, and Governor's Drive in Dasmariñas. Rolling stock was expected to consist of electric multiple units using overhead catenary traction power. The project was shelved indefinitely in 2018 because of issues including right-of-way acquisition and congestion along the highway.

=== Modified Line 6A and 6B+C proposal ===
In 2018, Villar-led Prime Asset Ventures Inc. submitted an alternative proposal for LRT Line 6. The proposal, known as LRT Line-6A and Line-6B+C, was an unsolicited public-private partnership proposal submitted to the Philippine government through the Department of Transportation on January 13, 2017. Line 6A would be an approximately 23.5 km (14.6 mi) elevated railway from Niog station in Bacoor to Governors station in Dasmariñas, with eight stations. Its alignment would traverse parts of Molino Boulevard, privately controlled properties, and Molino–Paliparan Road.

The proposal also includes Line 6B, from the NAIA Terminal 1/Terminal 2 station to San Nicolas station in Bacoor; Line 6C, from Sucat station to Lakefront station; and an Alabang–Zapote LRT line from Marcos Alvarez station in Las Piñas to Star Mall station in Muntinlupa. The Department of Environment and Natural Resources, through the Environmental Management Bureau, issued an Environmental Compliance Certificate for the project in February 2020. As of December 2020, the modified LRT-6 proposal was being evaluated by the National Economic and Development Authority (NEDA).

== Proposed stations ==
The modified Line 6 proposal is a 23.5 km (14.6 mi) line with nine proposed stations. The main line is known as the Modified Line 6, formerly called Line 6A. It would start at Niog station, connecting with the LRT Line 1 Cavite extension, and end at Governor's Drive station. Due to alignment changes, the proposed Governor's Drive station in Dasmariñas was relocated to Barangay Paliparan, 4.4 kilometers (2.7 miles) east of the original station in the Pala-Pala area in Barangay Sampaloc I. An extension of the line to Tagaytay has also been proposed, although only the main section has been presented to the government.

Three stations have been named after locations outside the line's actual right-of-way: San Pedro, Alabang, and GMA. San Pedro is named after the city of San Pedro, Laguna; Alabang after the eponymous barangay in Muntinlupa; and GMA station after the town of General Mariano Alvarez, Cavite. According to the unsolicited proposal, Alabang station would be located in Barangay Molino IV in Bacoor, while San Pedro would be located in Salawag and GMA in Paliparan IV; both are barangays of Dasmariñas.

List of stations
Name	Structure type	Connections	Location
Niog	Elevated	Proposed interchange with Manila LRT	Bacoor, Cavite
Bacoor City Hall	Elevated	none	Bacoor, Cavite
San Nicolas	Embankment	Bus routes: 32 SAMC	Bacoor, Cavite
Daang Hari	Embankment	Bus routes: 32 SM City Molino	Bacoor, Cavite
San Pedro	Elevated	none	Bacoor, Cavite
Alabang	Embankment	none	Dasmariñas, Cavite
La Salle	Elevated	none	Dasmariñas, Cavite
GMA	Elevated	none	Dasmariñas, Cavite
Governor's Drive	Elevated	Bus routes: 32 Carissa Homes	Dasmariñas, Cavite

== Expansion ==
The Filipino proponents and Japanese consultants also included proposed extensions in their documents. These include Line 6B, an airport rail link extension of Line 6 to Ninoy Aquino International Airport; Line 6C, a spur line near the Parañaque–Muntinlupa border; Line 6D, another spur line to Alabang, near Alabang station of the Philippine National Railways; and an extension of Line 6 to Tagaytay. Line 6D is also being developed by the Japanese firm as a separate line. Altogether, the combined line length is at approximately 86 km (53 mi) with a combined track length of around 169 km (105 mi). According to the 2020 Japanese study, the expansion was proposed to be completed by 2040.

=== Line 6B ===
Line 6B would run between Ninoy Aquino International Airport in Pasay and San Nicolas station on Line 6A in Bacoor, Cavite. The line would be 16 kilometers (9.9 miles) long with 10 stations and will have a single-track section between NAIA and Sucat Road.

List of stations
Name	Structure type	Connections	Location
NAIA Terminal 1	Elevated	Manila MRT: MMS NAIA Terminal 1 and 2; Bus routes: 44 NAIA Terminal 1	Pasay
Sucat	Elevated	Proposed interchange with Manila LRT: 6C; Bus routes: 44 SM City Sucat	Parañaque
Canaynay	Elevated	Proposed interchange with Manila LRT: 6C	Parañaque
Naga	Elevated	none	Las Piñas
Daang Hari	Elevated	none	Las Piñas
Alabang–Zapote	Elevated	none	Las Piñas
Marcos–Alvarez	Elevated	none	Las Piñas
Apollo	Elevated	none	Las Piñas
Queen's Row	Elevated	none	Las Piñas
San Nicolas	Embankment	Proposed interchange with Manila LRT: 6	Bacoor, Cavite

=== Line 6C ===
Line 6C would run along the right-of-way of Dr Santos Avenue in Parañaque. A 7.7 km (4.8 mi), six-station spur of Line 6B, it would diverge from Line 6B between Canaynay and El Grande stations. Although most of the alignment would not present right-of-way issues for an elevated railway, a two-way ramp leading to the Sucat exit of the Metro Manila Skyway would require the section leading to Lake Front station to be built as a underpass.

List of stations
Name	Structure type	Connections	Location
Sucat (NAIA)	Elevated	Proposed interchange with Manila LRT: 6B; Bus routes: 44 SM City Sucat	Parañaque
Canaynay	Elevated	Proposed interchange with Manila LRT: 6B	Parañaque
El Grande	Elevated	Bus routes: 44 WalterMart Sucat	Parañaque
San Antonio	Elevated	none	Parañaque
President	Elevated	none	Parañaque
St. James	Elevated	Bus routes: 44 SM City BF	
Lake Front	Depressed	PNR: NSCR Sucat; Bus routes: 10 15A 24 36 40 44 50 PNR-2 Sucat	Muntinlupa

=== Line 6D ===
Line 6D would connect to Line 6B at Marcos–Alvarez station in Las Piñas. It would be 5 km (3.1 mi) long, with four stations along Alabang–Zapote Road in Las Piñas and Muntinlupa. The line has a targeted opening date of 2030.

This branch is also the subject of a Japanese feasibility study published by METI in 2020. Line 6D's Star Mall station would be located on a vacant lot beside the Alabang exit of the South Luzon Expressway. The study also proposed a footbridge connection to the future Alabang station of the North–South Commuter Railway. The branch is proposed to be converted into a separate line in the future, named the Alabang–Zapote Line. If approved, the Alabang–Zapote Line would reach the Cavite Economic Zone in Rosario, Cavite. Its total length would be 23 kilometers (14 miles). The expansion is targeted for completion by 2040.

List of stations
Name	Structure type	Connections	Location
Marcos–Alvarez	Elevated	Proposed interchange with Manila LRT: 6B; Bus routes: 23 SM Southmall	Las Piñas
Madrigal	Elevated	Bus routes: 23 Alabang Town Center	Muntinlupa
Filinvest	Elevated	none	Muntinlupa
South Superhighway	Elevated	PNR: NSCR Alabang; Bus routes: 10 15A 23 24 36 40 44 50 60 PNR-2 Alabang	Muntinlupa

== Technical ==
=== Rolling stock ===
The line would use electric multiple units powered through overhead lines, although the rolling stock type remains unspecified. In the 2015 study, Line 6 trains were proposed to use 750 V DC electrification, similar to LRT Line 1 and some light rail and light rapid transit systems used overseas. The trainsets would be arranged in four-car formations, similar to newer-generation light rail vehicles (LRVs) used on Line 1. The use of the term "commuter rail" for the rolling stock made it unclear whether the line would use LRVs or high-capacity trainsets.

The 2019 proposal also left unspecified whether the line would use LRVs or rapid transit trainsets. It described a single-articulated, six-axle, standard-floor car type with eight passenger doorways, four on each side. Vehicles would be capable of multiple-unit operations of up to four cars with a total length of 100 m (330 ft), while each end of the car would be equipped with an operator's position. Each car would have a passenger capacity of 347 and an operating speed ranging from 35 to 70 km/h (22 to 43 mph).

An automated guideway transit system was also given as an option for Line 6D in the 2020 Japanese study presented by METI. The study also recommended the use of four-car trainsets, as in the 2015 proposal, and allowed for coupling two trains into eight-car sets. The maximum passenger capacity of the trainsets would be 300 per car, or 1,200 people per set. In comparison, the LRTA 13000 class has a maximum capacity of 1,388 passengers. The use of AGT, light rail vehicles, or heavy rail trainsets is under assessment by NEDA.

=== Station design ===
The 2020 study recommends that the line use island platforms because of their compact size and lower construction cost. The design of the elevated stations would be based on the Yurikamome automated guideway transit system in Tokyo. All elevated stations would feature eki-naka (ja) commercial development.

Three stations would be grade-separated by embankment instead of being fully elevated stations on a viaduct. These are San Nicolas, Daang Hari, and Alabang stations. These stations would be built over private property. Lake Front station on Line 6C would also be built partially underground due to conflicts with the pillars of the Metro Manila Skyway Sucat exit ramp. Except for these four stations, the line would be built on a viaduct.

=== Line 6 system length ===
Line	Stations	Line length	Track length
Line 6A	9	23.5 km (14.6 mi)	47 km (29 mi)
Line 6A Extension	4	18.5 km (11.5 mi)	37 km (23 mi)
Line 6B	10	16 km (9.9 mi)	29 km (18 mi) (Note: An approximated 3 km (1.9 mi) section of the line will be built as single-track.)
Line 6C	6	7.7 km (4.8 mi) (Note: 2.7 km (1.7 mi) will be shared with line 6B.)	15.4 km (9.6 mi)
Alabang–Zapote Line (6D)	4	5 km (3.1 mi)	10 km (6.2 mi)
Alabang–Zapote–CEZ Line (6D Extension)	15	18 km (11 mi)	36 km (22 mi)
Total	48	86 km (53 mi)	169 km (105 mi)
