= Niog station =

Railway station in Bacoor, Philippines

Niog

General information
- Location: Bacoor, Cavite
- System: Manila Light Rail Transit System
- Owner: Light Rail Transit Authority
- Lines: LRT Line 1 Line 6

Construction
- Structure type: Elevated

History
- Opening: 2031 (Line 1); TBA (Line 6)

Services
Preceding station	Manila LRT	Following station
Talaba towards Fernando Poe Jr.	LRT Line 1	Terminus
Terminus	Line 6	Bacoor City Hall towards Governor's Drive

Niog station is a proposed Light Rail Transit (LRT) station which will serve as the termini of the LRT Line 1 (LRT-1) and the proposed LRT Line 6 (LRT-6). The station will be situated on the intersection of Aguinaldo Highway and Niog Road in Bacoor, Cavite. It is part of the LRT-1 South Extension Project, being the final station on the planned extension, while it shall be an intermodal terminal with the LRT-6 towards Pala-Pala station.

The LRT-6 would link the station to the city of Dasmariñas further along the Aguinaldo Highway, creating seven more stations. When built, the station will also serve as the new line's northern terminus.

== History ==
Niog station was first planned as part of the Line 1 South Extension, which calls for a mostly elevated extension of approximately 11.7 kilometers (7.3 mi). The extension will have 8 passenger stations with an option for 2 future stations (Manuyo Uno and Talaba). The project was first approved on August 25, 2000 and the implementing agreement for the project was approved on January 22, 2002. However, construction for the extension was repeatedly delayed until the project was shelved years later.

The plans for the southern extension project were restarted as early as 2012 during the Benigno Aquino III administration and was expected to begin construction in 2014, but was delayed due to right of way issues. The issues were resolved in 2016 and the project broke ground on May 4, 2017. Meanwhile, construction works on the south extension began on May 7, 2019 after the right of way acquisitions were cleared.

On November 15, 2024, Phase 1 of the LRT Line 1 Extension, which runs between Redemptorist and Dr. Santos, was inaugurated; the LRMC management announced the start of its commercial operations to be on the following day. Meanwhile, Phases 2 and 3 will begin operations by 2031 as challenges hindered their completion with the delays in the acquisition of right of way.

== Nearby landmarks ==
The closest immediate landmarks to the station are Hotel Sogo and St. Dominic College of Asia only within the intersection of Aguinaldo Highway and Bacoor Boulevard.

== See also ==
- List of Manila LRT and MRT stations
- Manila Light Rail Transit System
