= Carriedo station =

Train station in Manila, Philippines

Coordinates: 14°35′56.40″N 120°58′52.89″E

Carriedo
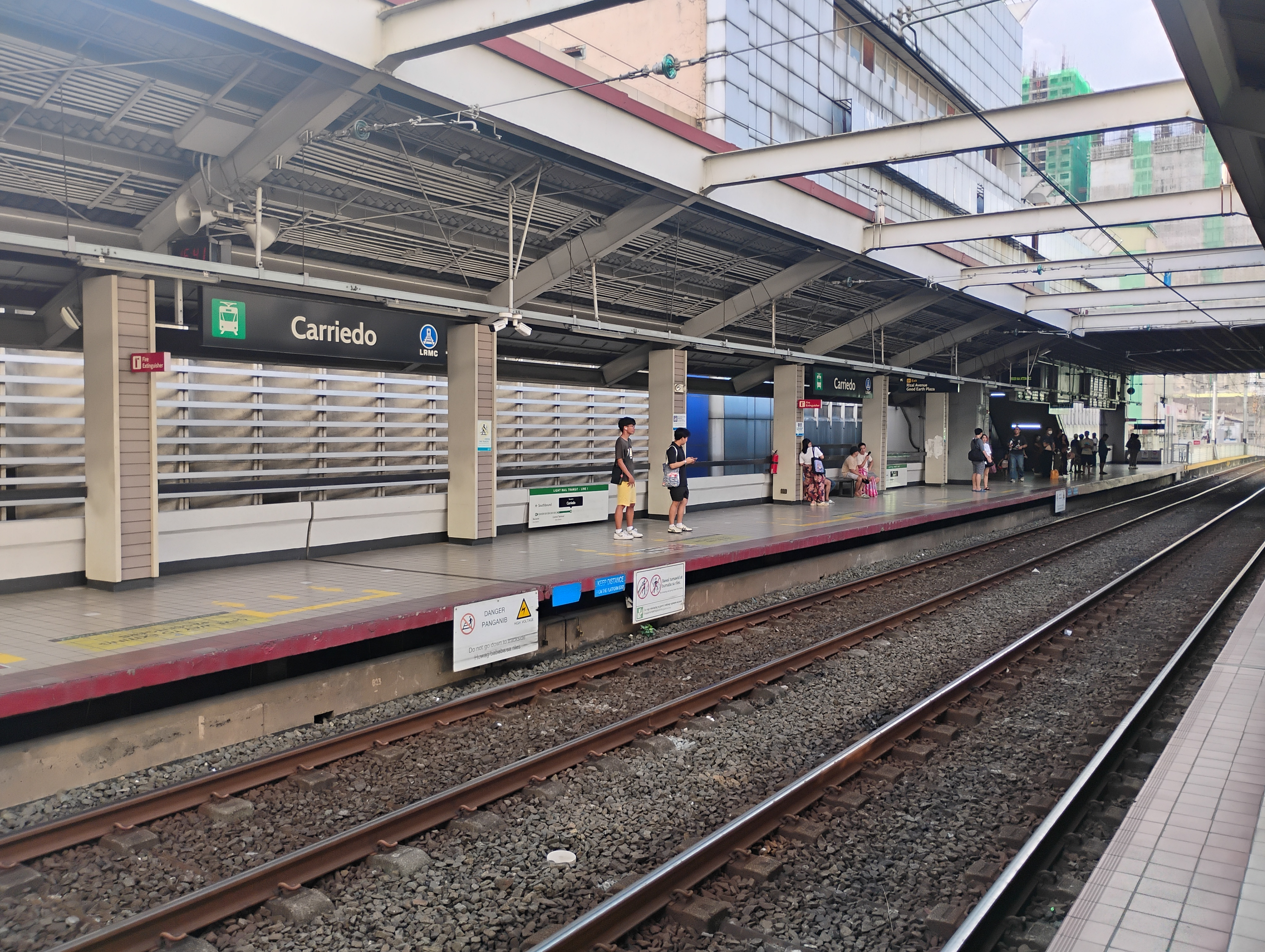

General information
- Location: Rizal Avenue, Quiapo and Santa Cruz; Manila, Metro Manila, Philippines
- Owner: Department of Transportation – Light Rail Transit Authority
- Operator: Light Rail Manila Corporation
- Line: LRT Line 1
- Platforms: 2 (2 side)
- Tracks: 2
- Connections: Escolta Ferry Station

Construction
- Structure type: Elevated
- Parking: Yes (Carriedo Street & Rizal Avenue side parking)

Other information
- Station code: GL11

History
- Opened: April 14, 1985; 41 years ago

Services
Preceding station	Manila LRT	Following station
Doroteo Jose towards Fernando Poe Jr.	LRT Line 1	Central towards Dr. Santos
Track layout
Location
- Location within Manila Location within Metro Manila Location within Luzon Location within Philippines

Carriedo station is an elevated Light Rail Transit (LRT) station located on the LRT Line 1 (LRT-1) system along the district boundary of Santa Cruz and Quiapo in Manila.

Carriedo is the first station north of the Pasig River. It is the fifteenth station for trains headed to Fernando Poe Jr. and the eleventh station for trains headed to Dr. Santos. It is named after Carriedo Street, which crosses beneath it and is itself named after Spanish philanthropist Francisco Carriedo y Pedero.

It is one of the ten stations on the line to have its concourse area below the platform, the other nine being Dr. Santos, Ninoy Aquino Avenue, PITX, MIA Road, Redemptorist-Aseana, Baclaran, Central Terminal, Balintawak, and Fernando Poe Jr.

== History ==
Carriedo station was opened on April 14, 1985, when LRT's passenger service was extended from its previous route between Arroceros (now Central Terminal) and Baclaran. It became the line's northern terminus, succeeding Arroceros, until Rizal Line was opened on May 12, 1985, to extend the line further north to Monumento.

== Station layout ==
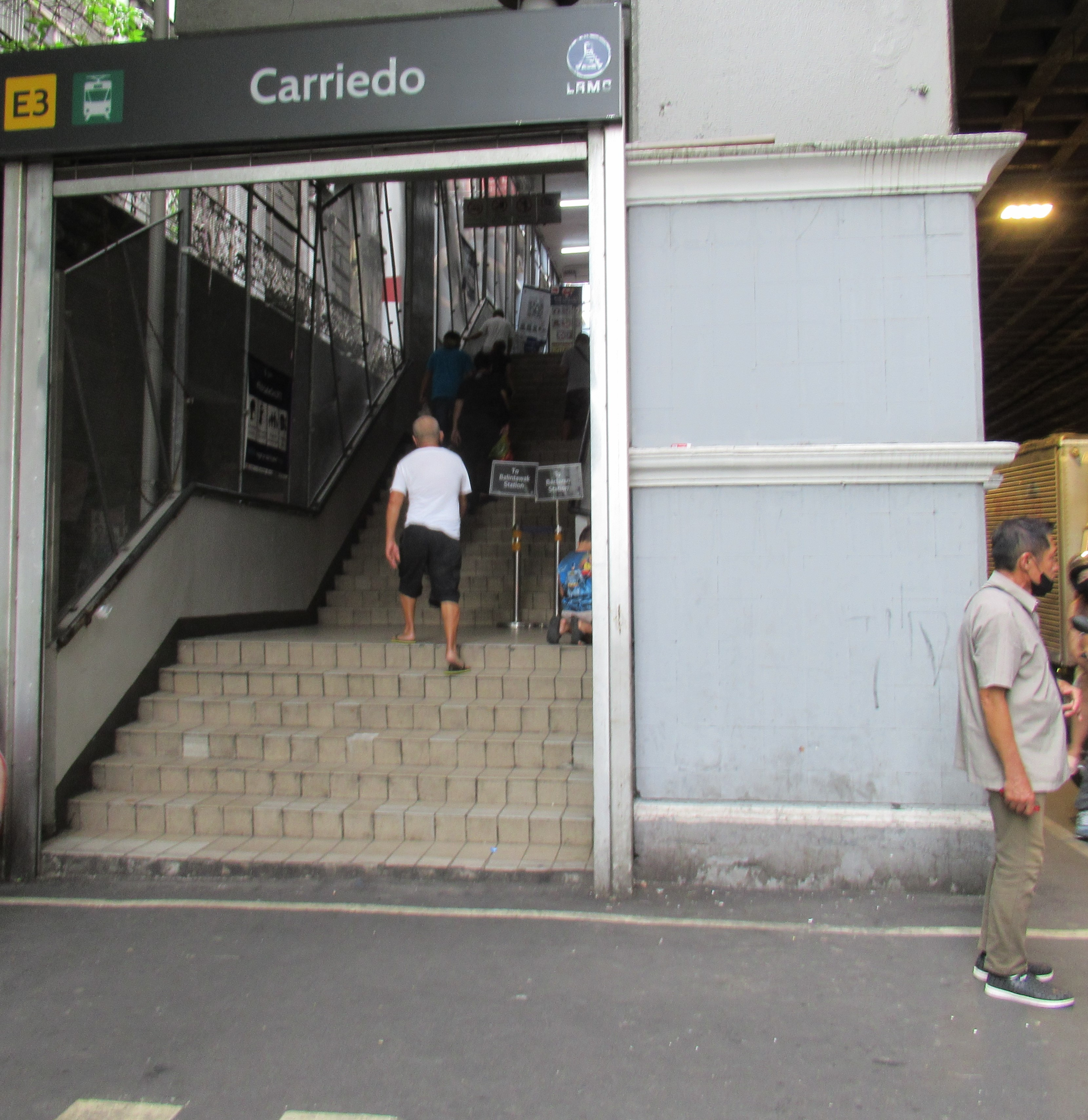
East entrance

Carriedo station is a three-level structure with two separate concourse areas, both on the second level: the south concourse, which connects to Isetann Carriedo and provides access via the south entrance on Carriedo Street, and the north concourse, which connects to Good Earth Plaza and provides access via the east and west entrances on Rizal Avenue. The ground (street) level houses entrances and retail shops, while carts and ATM are also found on the second level. The third level is dedicated to the side platforms.

It is also the only station on the entire line with a canopy roof with the others being fully-roofed. Like Balintawak, Central Terminal, Fernando Poe Jr., Doroteo Jose, and PITX stations, commuters do not have to go down to street level to cross from one platform to another. Unlike at Doroteo Jose, commuters do not pay another fare as well, as they transfer between platforms through the concourse.

== Nearby landmarks ==
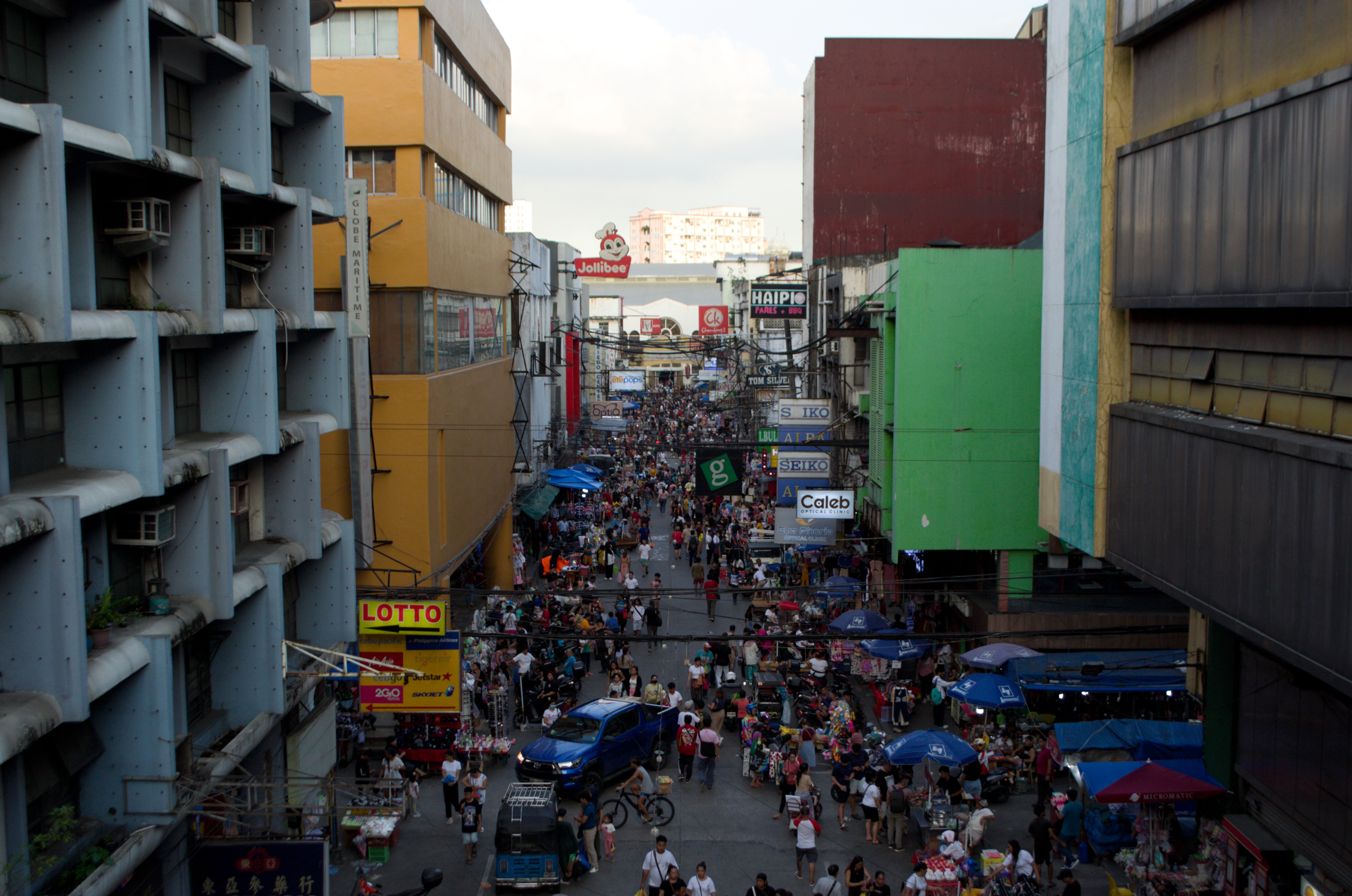
Carriedo Street as seen from the east platform of the station

Near the station are historic landmarks such as Santa Cruz Church, Quiapo Church, and the historic Escolta Street. It is also the most accessible stop to the oldest Chinatown in the world, Binondo. The station is directly connected to Good Earth Plaza and Isetann Carriedo shopping centers via walkway. It is located near various retailers including SM Quiapo and Plaza Fair, as well as institutions such as FEATI University and Universidad de Manila Henry Sy Sr. Campus.

== Transportation links ==
Due to Carriedo station's location being near three districts, namely, Santa Cruz, Binondo, and Quiapo, the station is served by many forms of public transport. Buses serving the Taft Avenue and Rizal Avenue routes and nearby routes, jeepneys, taxis, tricycles, pedicabs, and kalesas stop at and around the station. Kalesas and tricycles are particularly used in Binondo, due to the district's narrow streets.

== See also ==
- List of rail transit stations in Metro Manila
- Manila Light Rail Transit System
