= Ninoy Aquino (disambiguation) =

Benigno "Ninoy" Aquino Jr. (1932–1983) was a Filipino politician.

Ninoy Aquino may also refer to any of the following, all of which were named for the senator:

- Ninoy Aquino International Airport near Manila
- Ninoy Aquino Stadium in Manila
- Ninoy Aquino Parks & Wildlife Center in Quezon City
- Ninoy Aquino Library and Learning Resources Center at the Polytechnic University of the Philippines, Manila
- Ninoy Aquino Day, a national holiday in the Philippines
- Senator Ninoy Aquino, Sultan Kudarat, a municipality in Sultan Kudarat province
- Ninoy Aquino Avenue, a major road in Metro Manila
- Ninoy Aquino Avenue station, an LRT station in Parañaque
