= Asia World (disambiguation) =

Asia World is a Burmese conglomerate.

Asia World may also refer to:

- Asia World station, Manila
- AsiaWorld–Expo station, Hong Kong
