= Parañaque Integrated Terminal Exchange =

Public transport terminal in Parañaque, Philippines

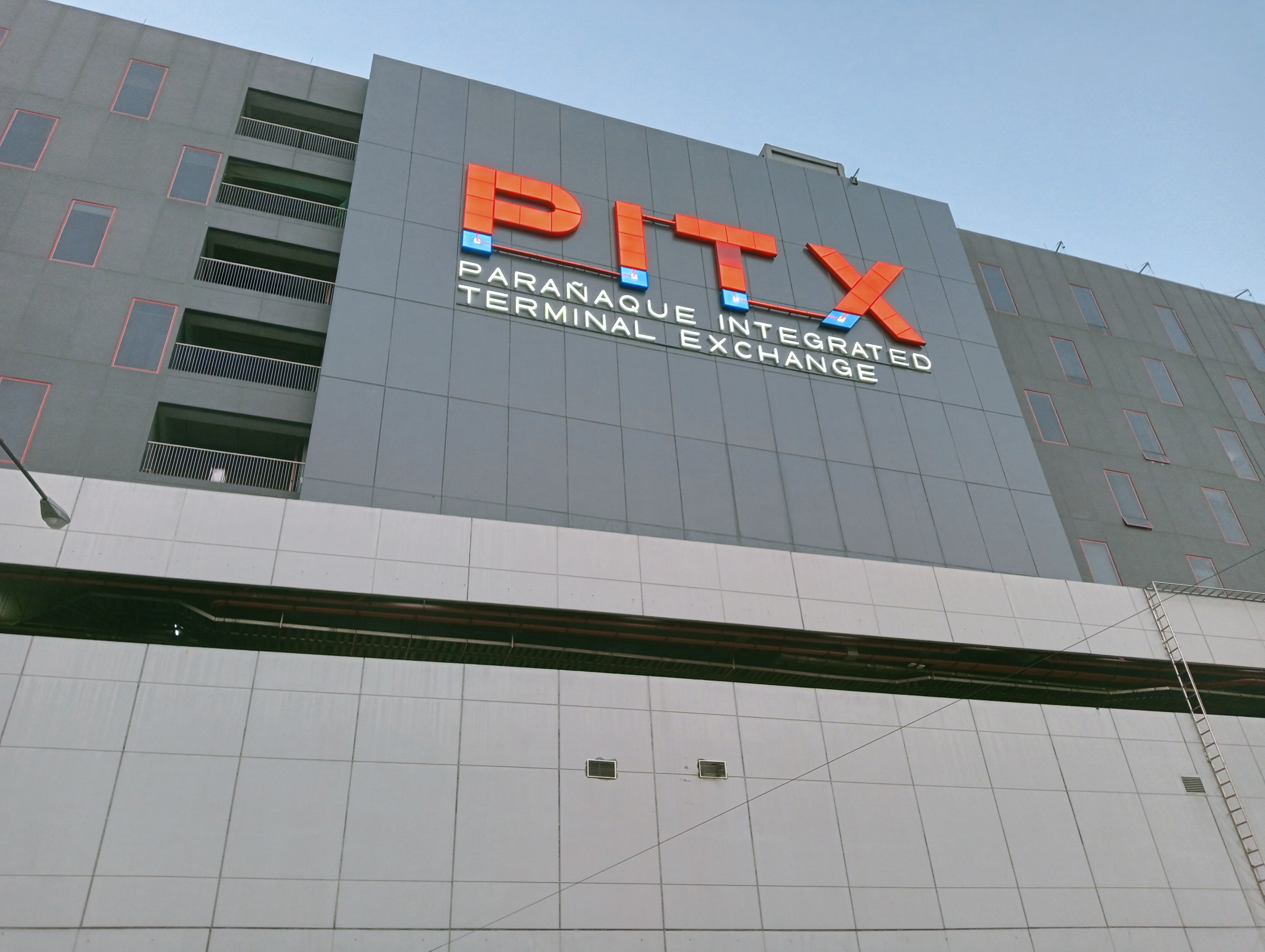

General information
- Location: 1 Kennedy Road, Asiaworld, Bay City, Parañaque, Metro Manila, Philippines
- Coordinates: 14°30′36.432″N 120°59′28.68″E
- System: Intermodal
- Owner: MWM Terminals
- Operator: MWM Terminals
- Bus routes: E 4 5 6 7 14 18 22 23 26 27 28 29 30 31 32 34 43 47 52 55 66
- Bus stands: 10 gates and 60 bays
- Connections: Transfers to Intercity and Provincial buses, jeepneys, and UV Express; PITX

Construction
- Parking: 852 slots
- Cycle facilities: Yes
- Accessible: yes

Other information
- Website: www.pitx.ph

History
- Opened: November 5, 2018; 7 years ago
- Former names: Southwest Integrated Terminal Exchange

Passengers
- 100,000 (daily average); 170,000 (holidays); 200,000 (designed capacity)
Location

The Parañaque Integrated Terminal Exchange (PITX, Tagalog pronunciation: [ˈpitɛks]) is a public transport terminal in Parañaque, Metro Manila, Philippines. PITX is built and operated by Megawide Construction Corporation and the Department of Transportation (DOTr) under the Philippine government's Public-Private Partnership program.

It replaced the older Southwest Integrated Transport Terminal (SITT) initially located at the derelict Uniwide Coastal Mall, also in Parañaque, which was transferred to HK Sun Plaza in Pasay as the Southwest Interim Provincial Terminal (SWIPT). It is located on a reclaimed sea area of Manila Bay between Manila–Cavite Expressway (CAVITEX) and Macapagal Boulevard, thus on a reclaimed highway lot.

Opened on November 5, 2018, PITX serves as a hub for buses, jeepneys, and other public utility vehicles headed for areas north of Metro Manila and areas south of Metro Manila (including Southern Luzon, the Visayas and Mindanao), and vice versa. It is projected to accommodate around 200,000 passengers. The terminal is also connected to its namesake station of LRT Line 1.

== History ==
Initial logo of PITX

On February 21, 2011, President Benigno Aquino III signed Executive Order No. 67, which sought for the establishment of integrated transport terminals in the north and south of Metro Manila. This led to the inception of the present-day Parañaque Integrated Terminal Exchange, which was initially known as the Southwest Integrated Terminal Exchange (SWITEX) during the Aquino administration. It was a public–private partnership (PPP) project that was bid out in 2014, ending up with 15 local bidders. In 2015, the Philippine government signed a 35-year build–operate–transfer (BOT) contract with MWM Terminals Inc., a consortium of Megawide Construction Corporation and WM Properties Inc. Originally scheduled to open in June 2018, its launch was delayed for unknown reasons, finally inaugurating on November 5, 2018, with a ceremony led by President Rodrigo Duterte.

== Location ==
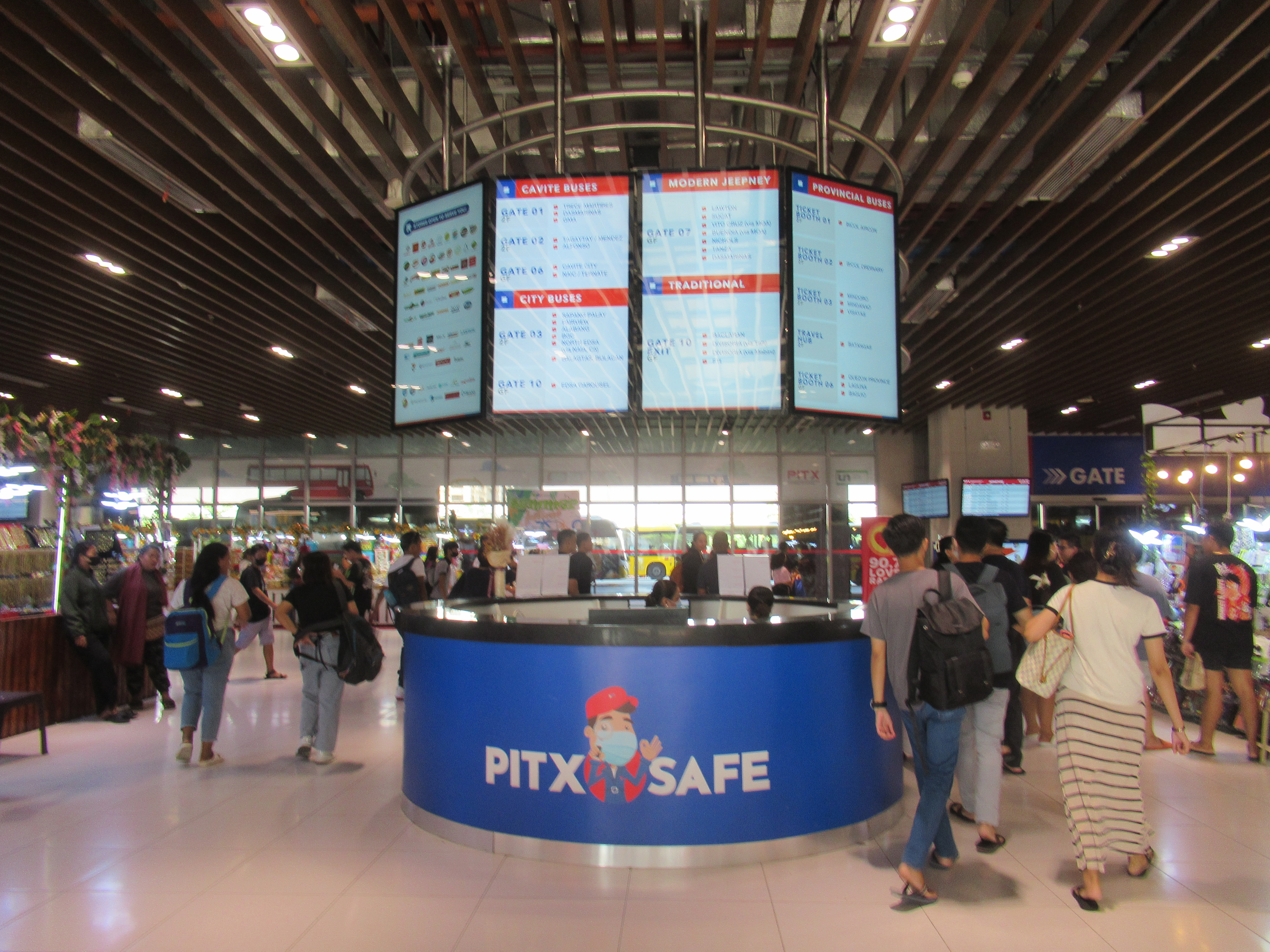
Reception area inside PITX

The Parañaque Integrated Terminal Exchange is located on a 4.5-hectare (11-acre) site in AsiaWorld, a subdistrict of Bay City in Parañaque, where 2.7-hectare (6.7-acre) is currently used for transport services, commercial spaces, and four office towers, while the remaining 1.8-hectare (4.4-acre) will serve as part of a ₱5 billion expansion project of the terminal and will be allocated for additional bus services. It is situated near the north end of the Manila–Cavite Expressway (CAVITEX) just off Macapagal Boulevard and a couple of blocks south of NAIA Road adjacent to the former Uniwide Sales Coastal Mall. Nearby landmarks include the Marina Bay Town and the integrated resorts of Entertainment City, including Okada Manila, City of Dreams Manila and Solaire Resort & Casino.

== Platforms ==
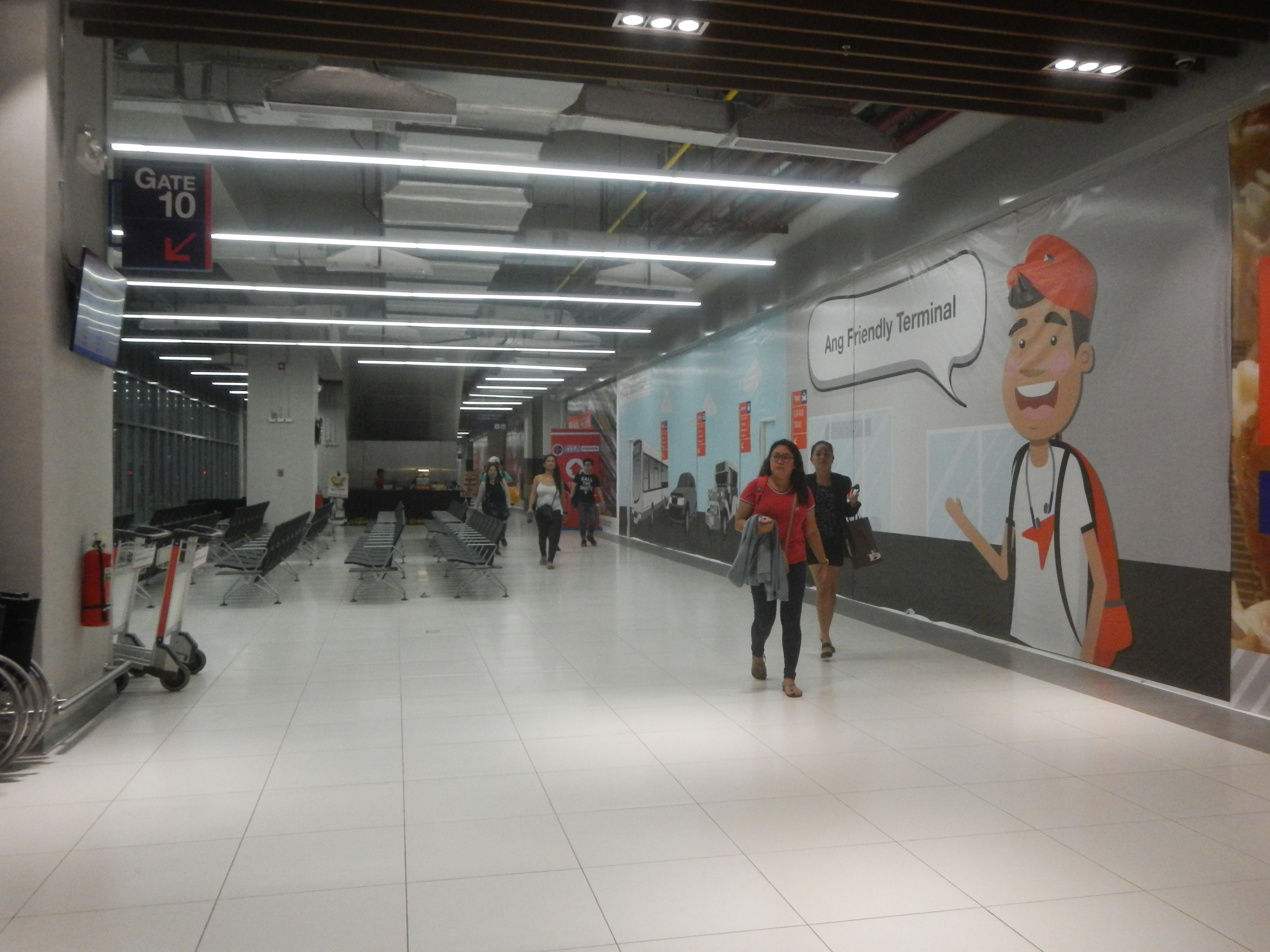
Ground floor of PITX

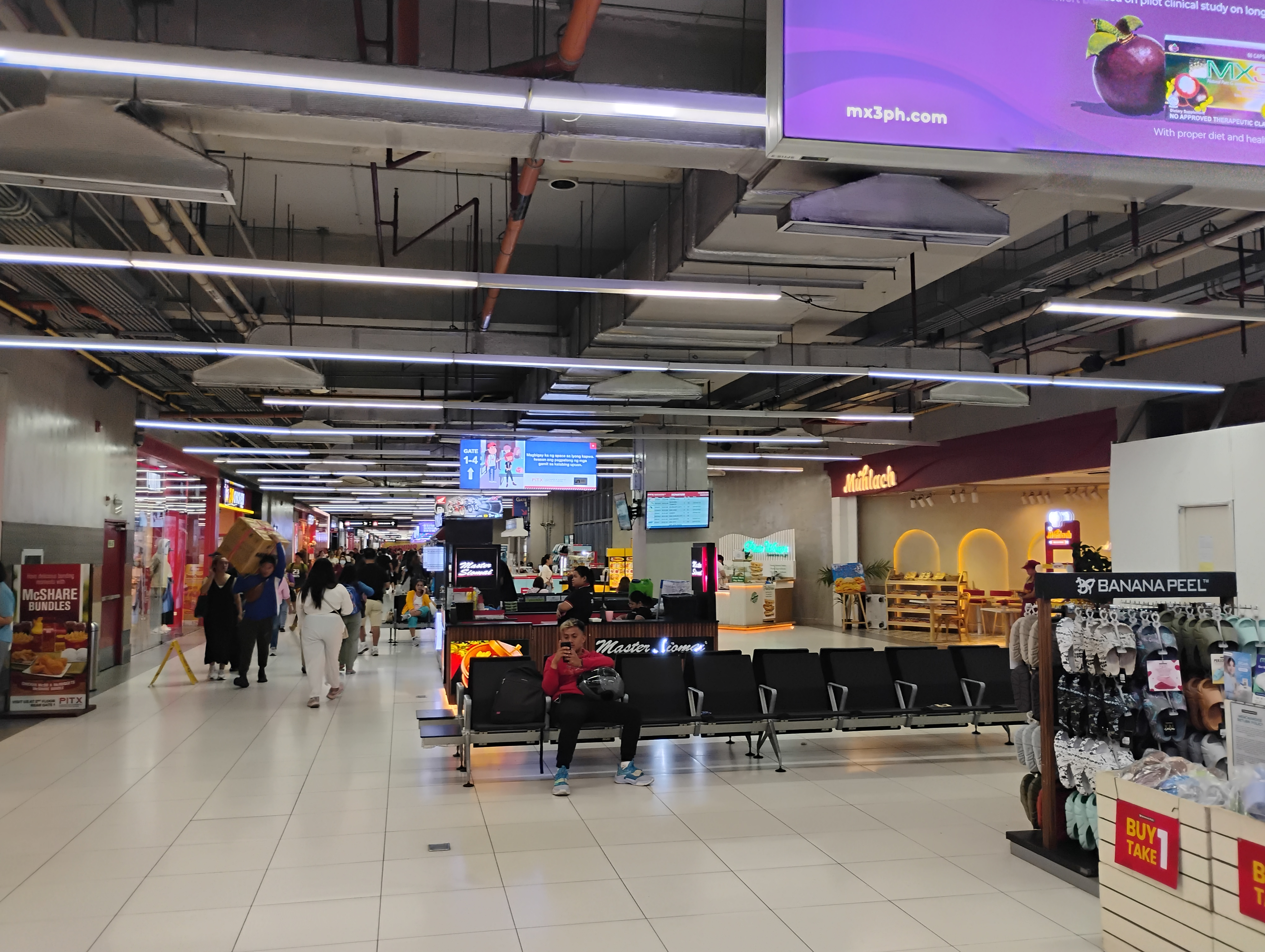
Second floor of PITX

The bus ticketing counters (named Ticket Booth 1 to 6) and boarding gates (named Gates 1 to 8) are located at the terminal's ground and second floor levels, while the arrival bays are only at the second and third gates of the second level.

The modern jeepney ticketing counter, boarding gate, and the arrival bays are all located on the second level. Food stalls can be found in both the ground and second levels. For this reason, buses from the Ninoy Aquino International Airport arrive at what are called "French Baked" gates. For traditional jeepneys, the loading bays are found on the north side of the terminal and the unloading bays are on the south. The UV Express departure and arrival platforms are all located on the third level. The taxi lane area can be found on the ground floor near the main entrance.

== Services ==
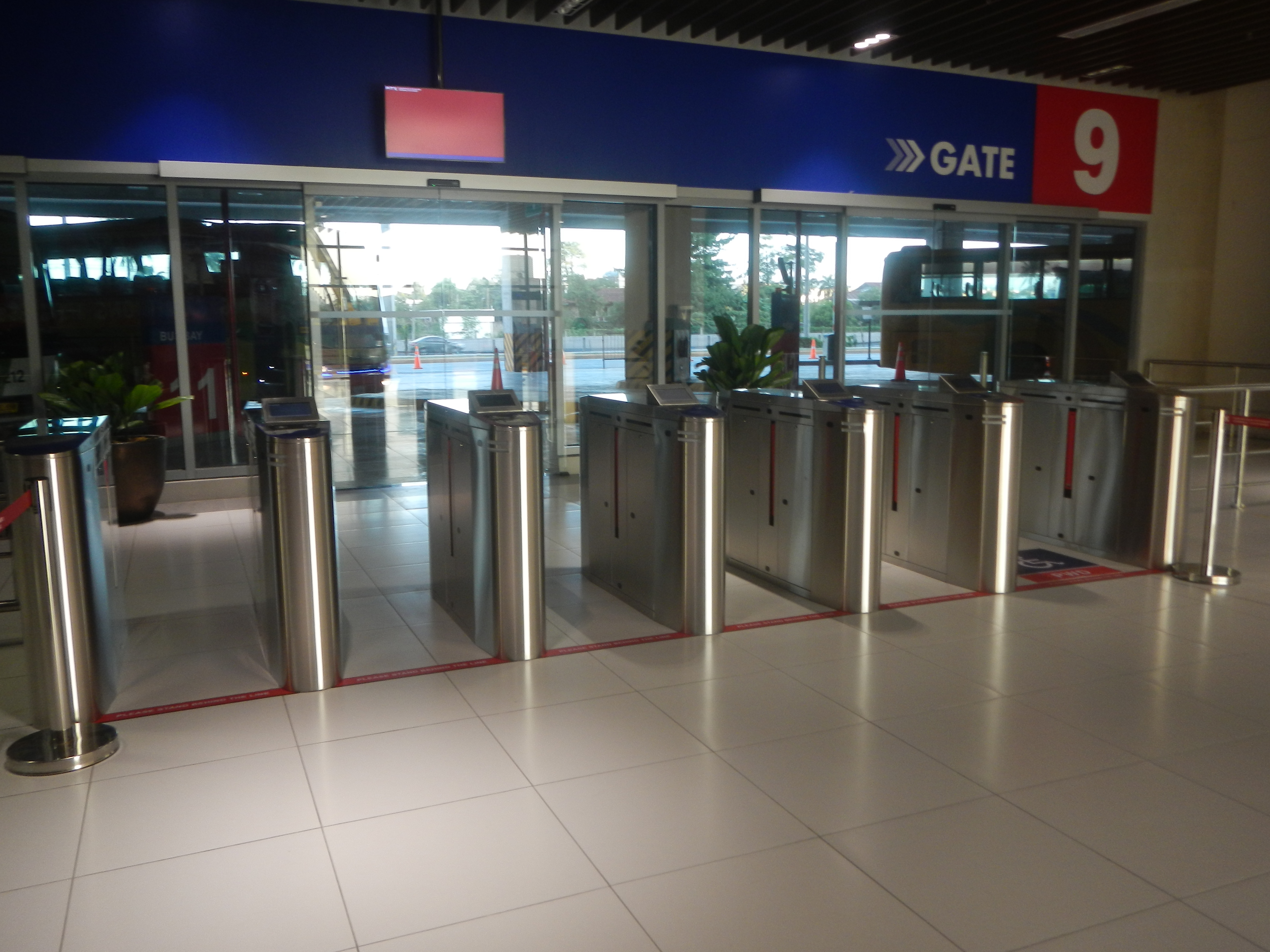
QR code-capable turnstiles at boarding gate 9

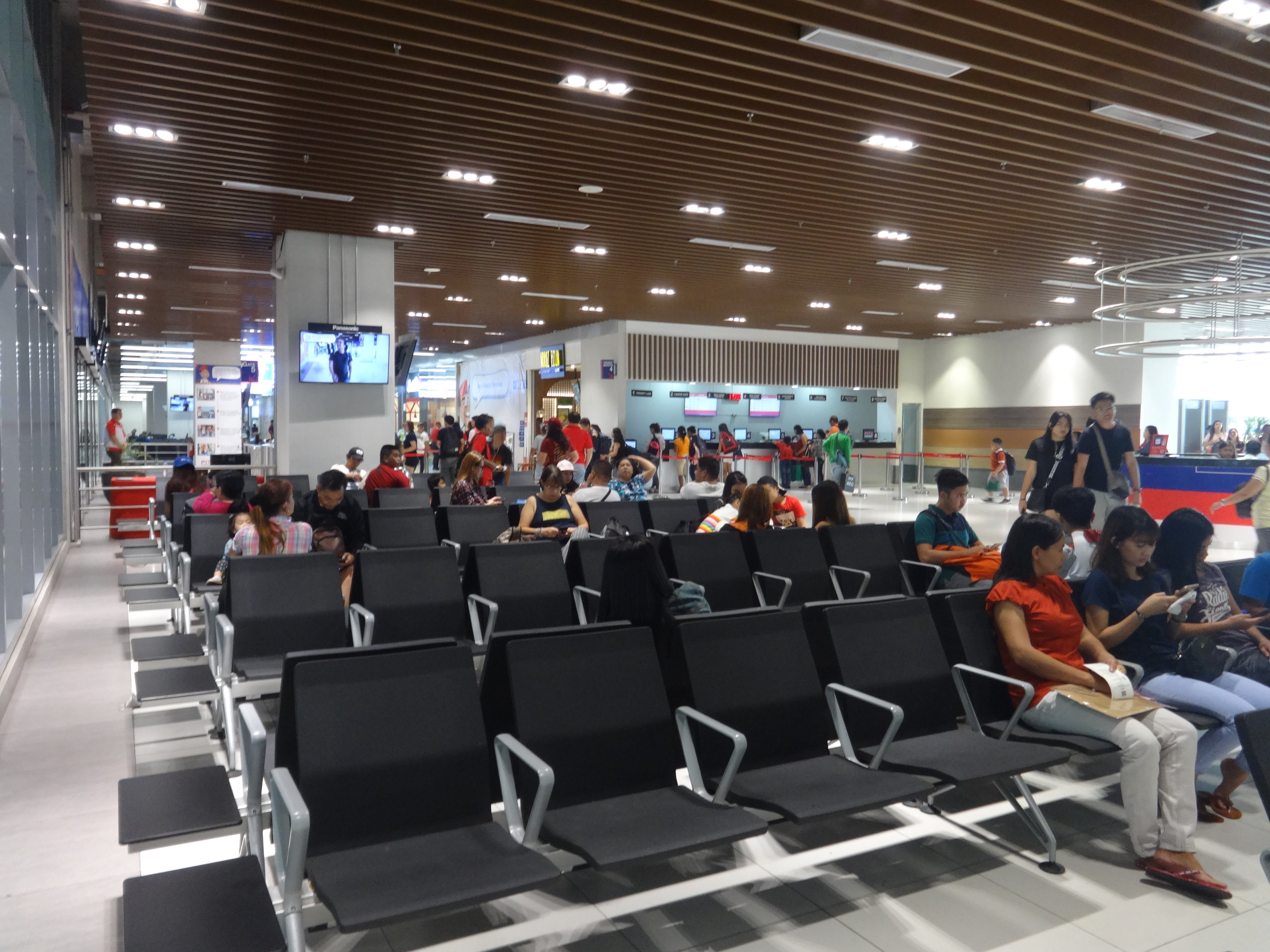
Ticketing hall

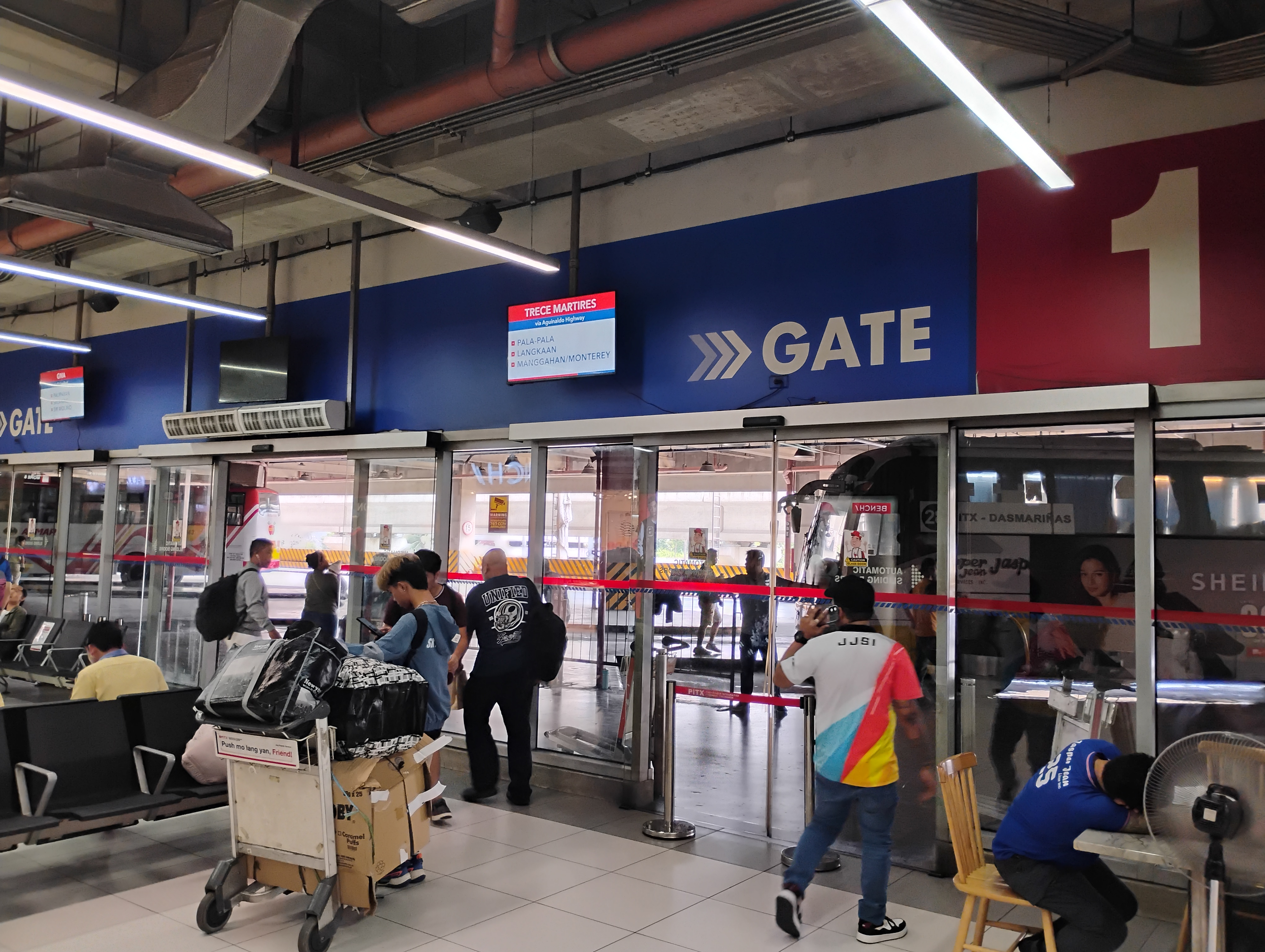
Boarding gate 1

As of January 2025, PITX services the following routes:

=== Intercity ===
==== Bus ====
- Premium Point-to-Point Bus Service operates express bus services to Baguio, Batangas City, and Lipa.
- Intercity bus lines operate out of the terminal to Metro Manila and surrounding destinations such as Monumento via EDSA Carousel, McKinley Hill, Ciudad de Victoria, Sapang Palay in San Jose del Monte, Fairview, Diliman, Balagtas, Valenzuela, Lawton, NAIA, Alabang, Cavite City, Dasmariñas, Naic, Trece Martires, General Mariano Alvarez, Montalban, Navotas, Pacita Complex in San Pedro, Balibago in Santa Rosa, and Lancaster New City.

==== Jeep ====
- Modern jeeps operate to Lawton, MIA (NAIA Terminal 2), Nichols (NAIA Terminal 3), Sucat, Alabang, SM Southmall, Buendia, Vito Cruz, and SM Mall of Asia.
- Traditional jeeps operate to Binondo (Divisoria), Blumentritt via Santa Cruz and Quiapo, and Sampaloc (Dapitan) for northbound. These routes either go through Taft Avenue or Harrison Avenue for the way in the south. Alabang, FTI, SM Southmall, and Sucat (via Quirino Avenue or Aquino Avenue) for eastbound.

=== Provincial ===
==== Bus ====
- Provincial bus lines operate to and from the following destinations in Batangas: Balayan, Calatagan, Lemery, Lian, Lipa, Nasugbu, and San Juan.
- Provincial bus lines operate to and from the following destinations in Cavite: Alfonso, Amadeo, Indang, Mendez, Silang, Tagaytay, and Ternate
- Provincial bus lines operate to and from the following destinations in Bicol Region: Bulan, Daet, Legazpi, Naga, Placer, Sorsogon City, and Virac.
- JAC Liner – operates provincial bus service to and from Lucena in Quezon
- Pangasinan Solid North Transit – operates Premium Point-to-Point Bus Service to and from Baguio bus route
- Provincial bus lines operate to and from San Jose, Occidental Mindoro.
- CIBL Tourist Transport Inc. – operates provincial bus service to and from Palompon, Leyte.
- Davao Metro Shuttle - operates provincial bus service to Davao City
- Eastern Goldtrans Inc. - operates provincial bus service to Oras, Eastern Samar and San Jose, Dinagat Islands
- Saulog Transit – operates provincial bus service to Olongapo
- GV Florida Transport and Victory Liner - operates provincial bus service to Tuguegarao
- Twin Hearts Trans. Corp. – operates provincial bus service to Magallanes, Sorsogon

==== Jeep ====
- Provincial modern jeeps operate to Dasmariñas (Pala-Pala and Paliparan) and Tanza.
- Provincial traditional jeeps operate to Dasmariñas - DBB and Paliparan; Imus - Anabu Kostal; and Bacoor - extending to Imus City Proper.

=== Interconnections ===
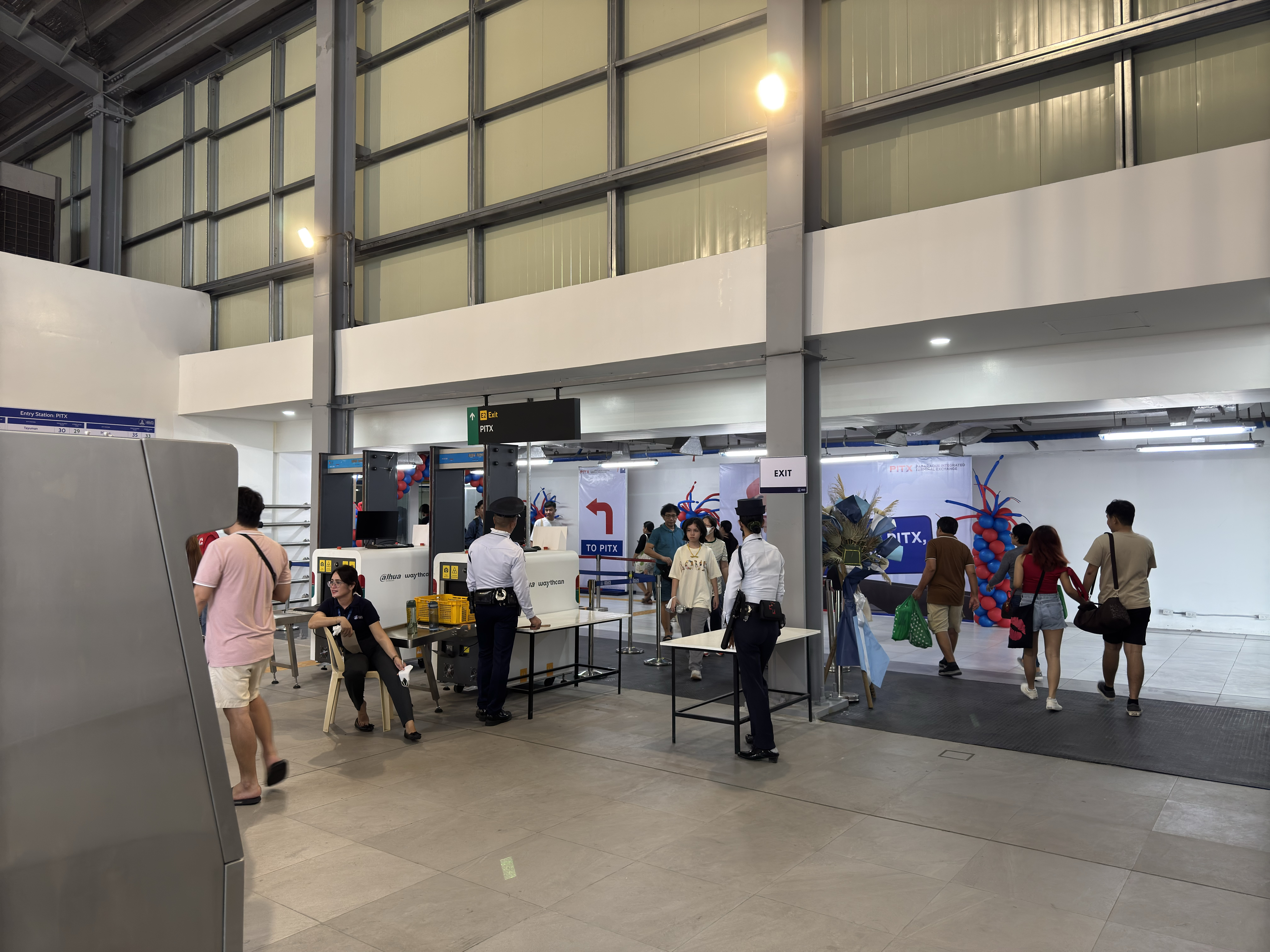
PITX entrance from the LRT Line 1 station of the same name.

- The terminal is linked to the LRT-1 station of the same name at the third floor.

==== Future and proposed links ====
- A proposed spur line of the Metro Manila Subway will be linked to PITX.
