= MIA Road station =

Train station in Parañaque, Philippines

MIA Road	GL23
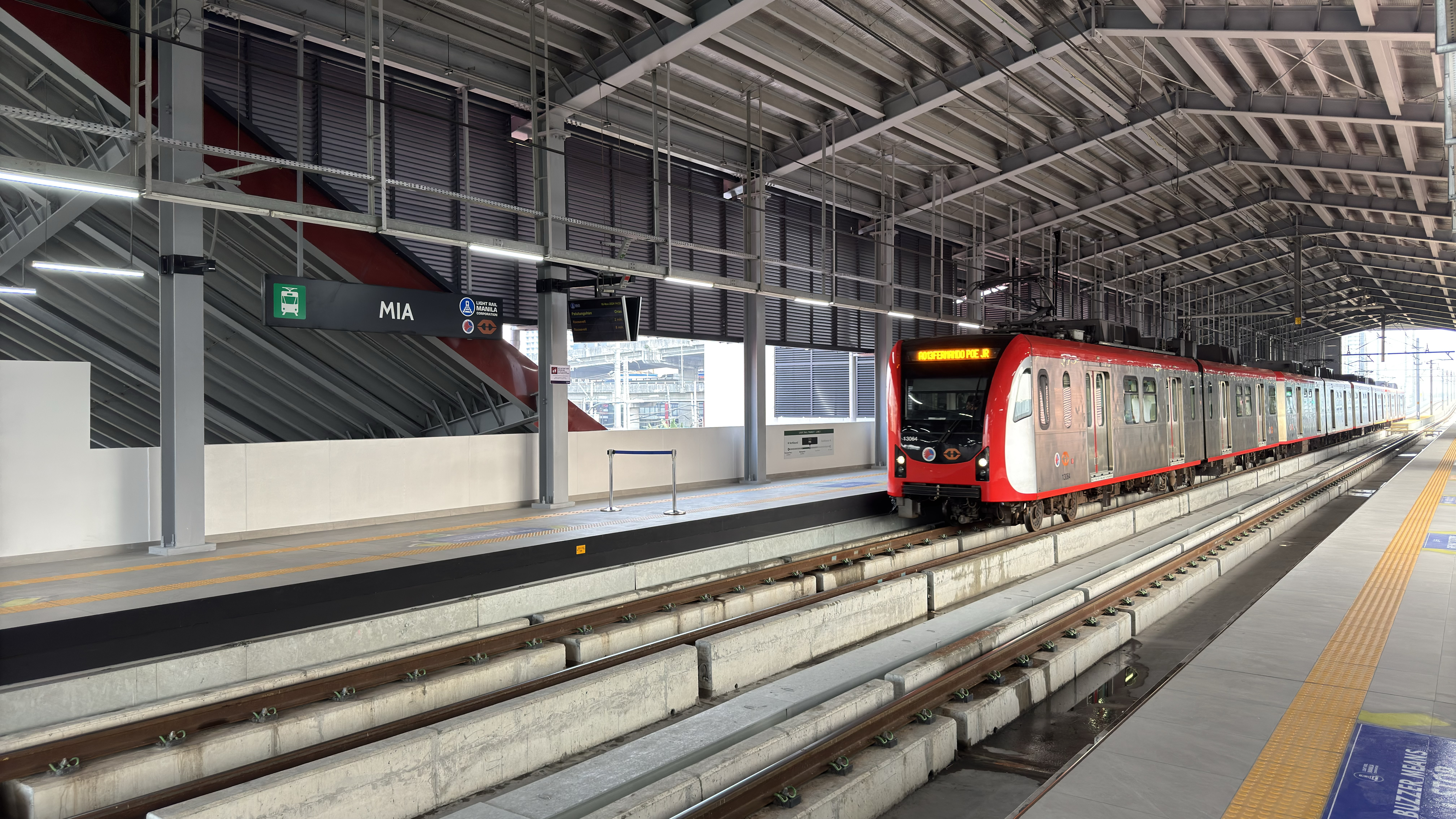

General information
- Other names: MIA
- Location: Roxas Boulevard cor. Seaside Drive; Tambo, Parañaque
- Coordinates: 14°31′06″N 120°59′35″E
- Owner: Light Rail Transit Authority
- Line: Line 1
- Platforms: 2 (2 side)
- Tracks: 2

Construction
- Structure type: Elevated

History
- Opened: November 16, 2024; 21 months ago

Services
Preceding station	Manila LRT	Following station
Redemptorist-Aseana towards Fernando Poe Jr.	LRT Line 1	PITX towards Dr. Santos
Track layout
Location
- Location within Metro Manila

MIA Road station, also known as MIA station, is an elevated Light Rail Transit (LRT) station located on the LRT Line 1 (LRT-1) system in Barangay Tambo, Parañaque. It is part of the Line 1 Cavite Extension Project, which opened to the public on November 16, 2024. Situated at the intersection of Roxas Boulevard and Seaside Drive, which is the physical continuation of the adjacent NAIA Road, it serves Tambo and Entertainment City.

The station is the fourth station for trains headed to Fernando Poe Jr., the twenty-second station for trains headed to Dr. Santos and is one of the five LRT-1 stations in Parañaque; the others are Redemptorist–Aseana, PITX, Ninoy Aquino Avenue, and Dr. Santos.

== Name ==
Previously known as MIA station, the station was officially renamed MIA Road station shortly before its inauguration. The name was derived after the nearby road formerly called MIA Road (now NAIA Road), which was named after the Manila International Airport before the airport itself was renamed after the late Senator Ninoy Aquino in 1987. Despite its name, the station is located at the intersection between Seaside Drive (NAIA Road's physical continuation to Bay City) and Roxas Boulevard, and not within the airport complex. Furthermore, Ninoy Aquino Avenue station is located closer to the airport, while a Metro Manila Subway station is being built next to NAIA Terminal 3 in Pasay.

== History ==
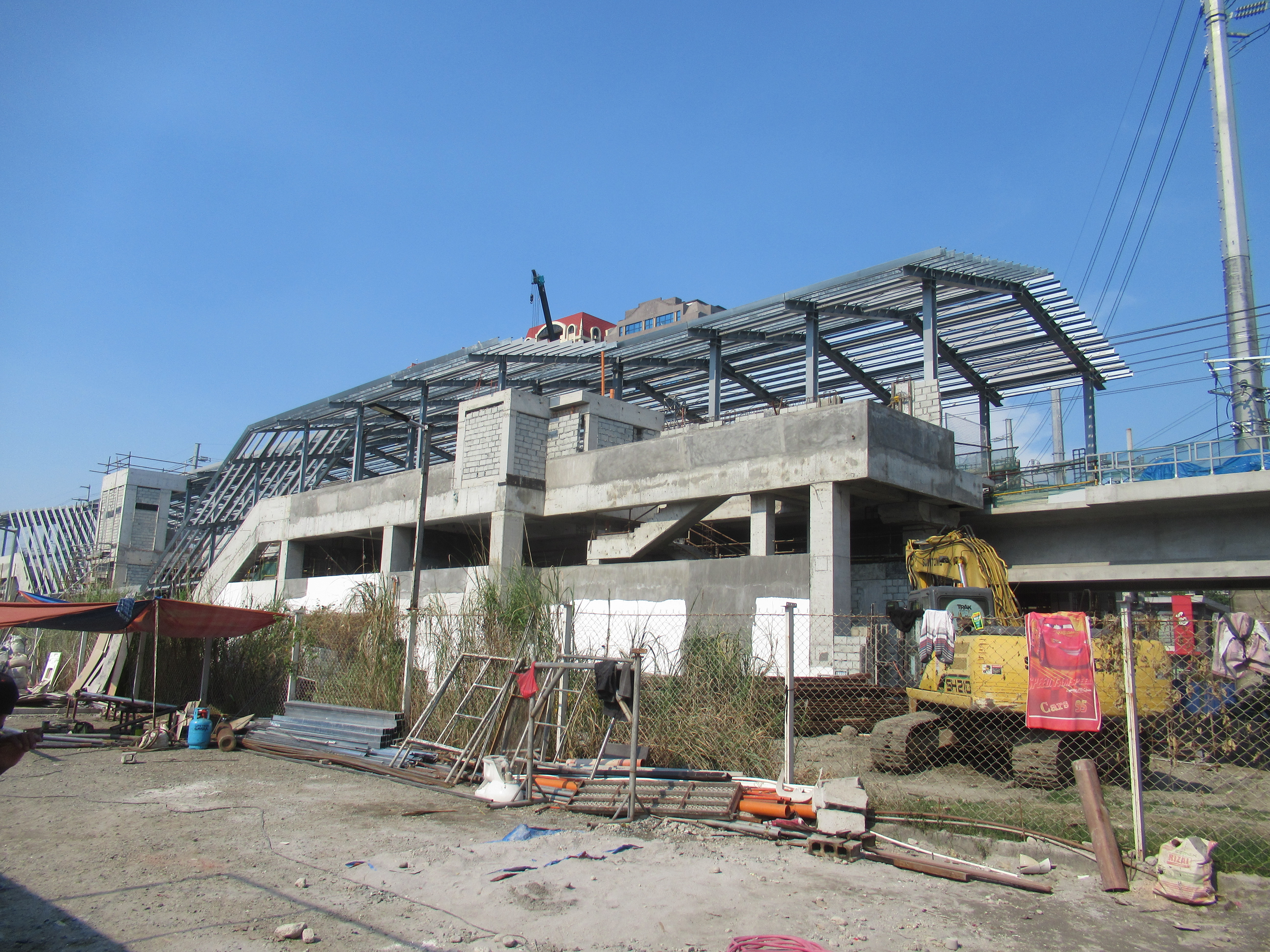
MIA Road station under construction in April 2023

The plan to build a station near NAIA Road was first introduced in the 1990s as part of the proposed LRT Line 6, which would run from Baclaran to either Zapote in Bacoor or Dasmariñas. It was known as International Terminal station and later NAIA Road station.

The plan was later revived as part of the Line 1 Cavite Extension plan, which calls for a mostly elevated extension of approximately 11.7 kilometers (7.3 mi). The project was first approved on August 25, 2000, and the implementing agreement for the project was approved on January 22, 2002. However, construction for the extension was repeatedly delayed until the project was shelved years later.

The plans for the southern extension project were restarted as early as 2012 during the Benigno Aquino III administration and was expected to begin construction in 2014 but was delayed due to right-of-way issues. The issues were resolved in 2016 and the project broke ground on May 4, 2017. Meanwhile, construction works on the south extension began on May 7, 2019, after the right of way acquisitions were cleared.

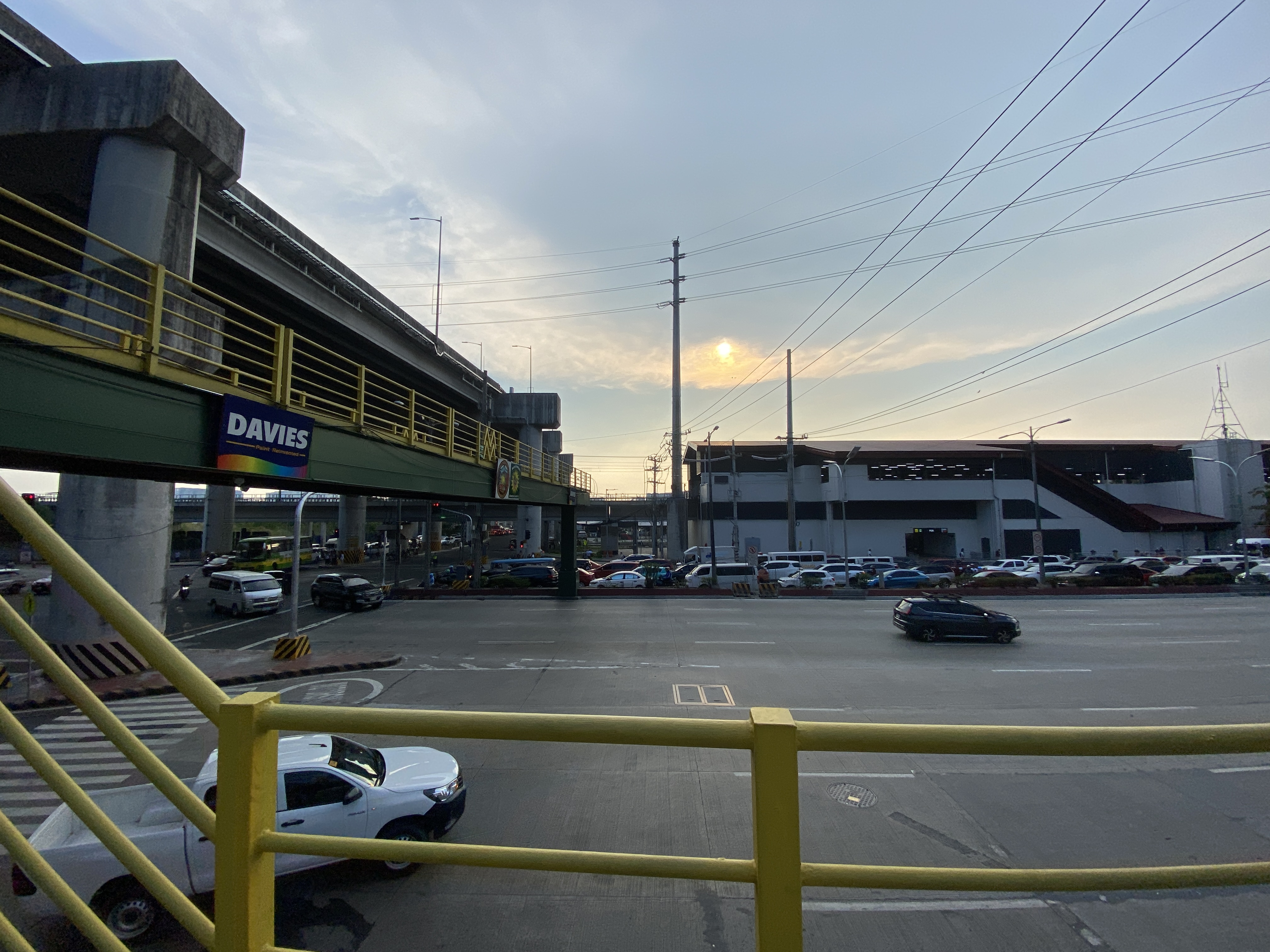
The station near the pedestrian overpass crossing Roxas Boulevard

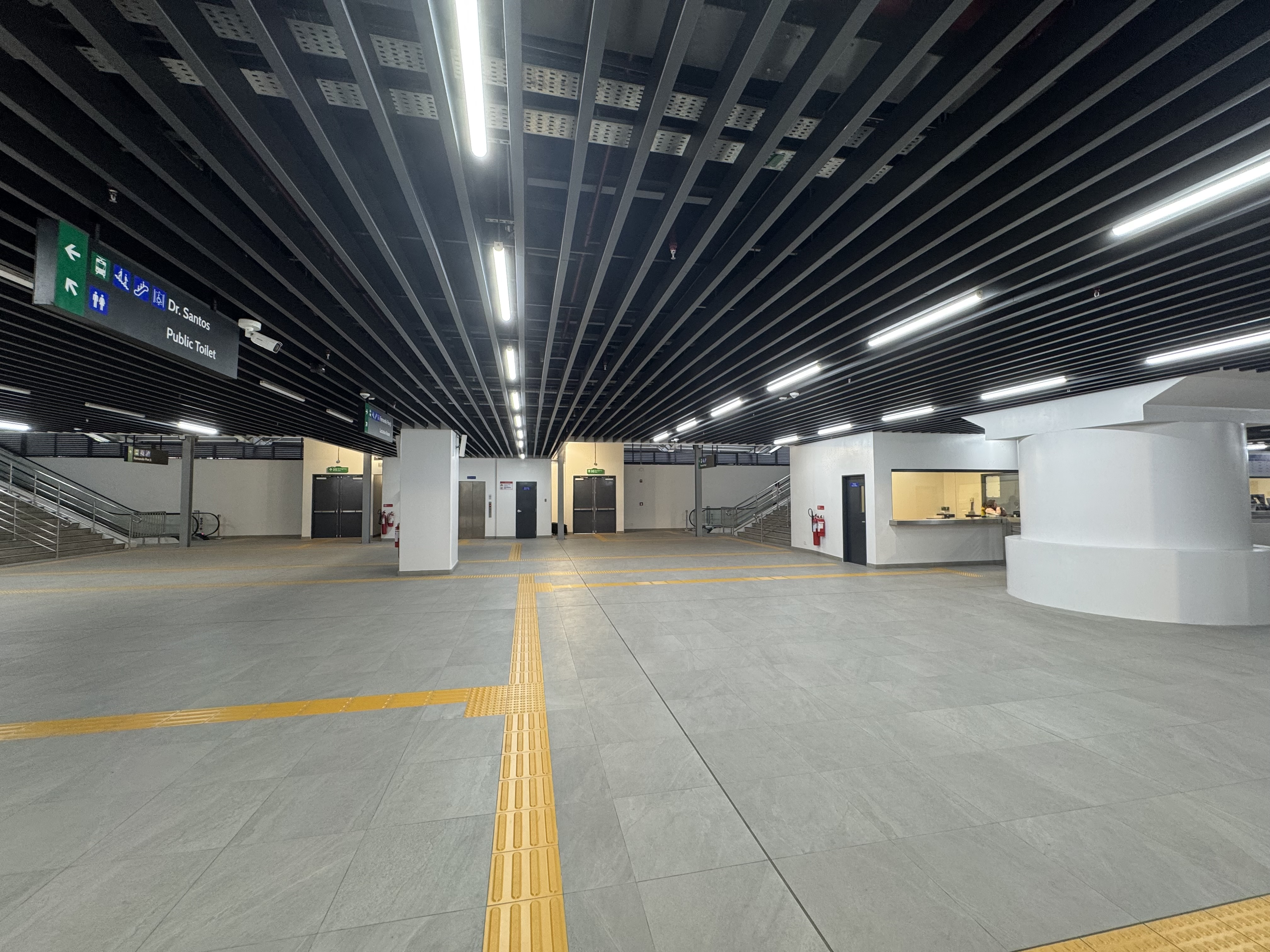
Concourse area of MIA Road station

On November 15, 2024, Phase 1 of the extension was inaugurated by President Bongbong Marcos; the LRMC management announced the commencement of its commercial operations the following day.

== Transportation links ==
Buses, jeepneys, and UV Express plying the Roxas Boulevard route serve the station, as well as the Baclaran–Sucat jeepney route plying NAIA Road.

Since November 18, 2024, a modern jeepney route connects the station with the Redemptorist-Aseana station and the nearby Ayala Malls Manila Bay, offering free rides.

== See also ==
- List of Manila LRT and MRT stations
- Manila Light Rail Transit System
