= Redemptorist–Aseana station =

Train station in Parañaque, Philippines

Redemptorist–Aseana	GL22
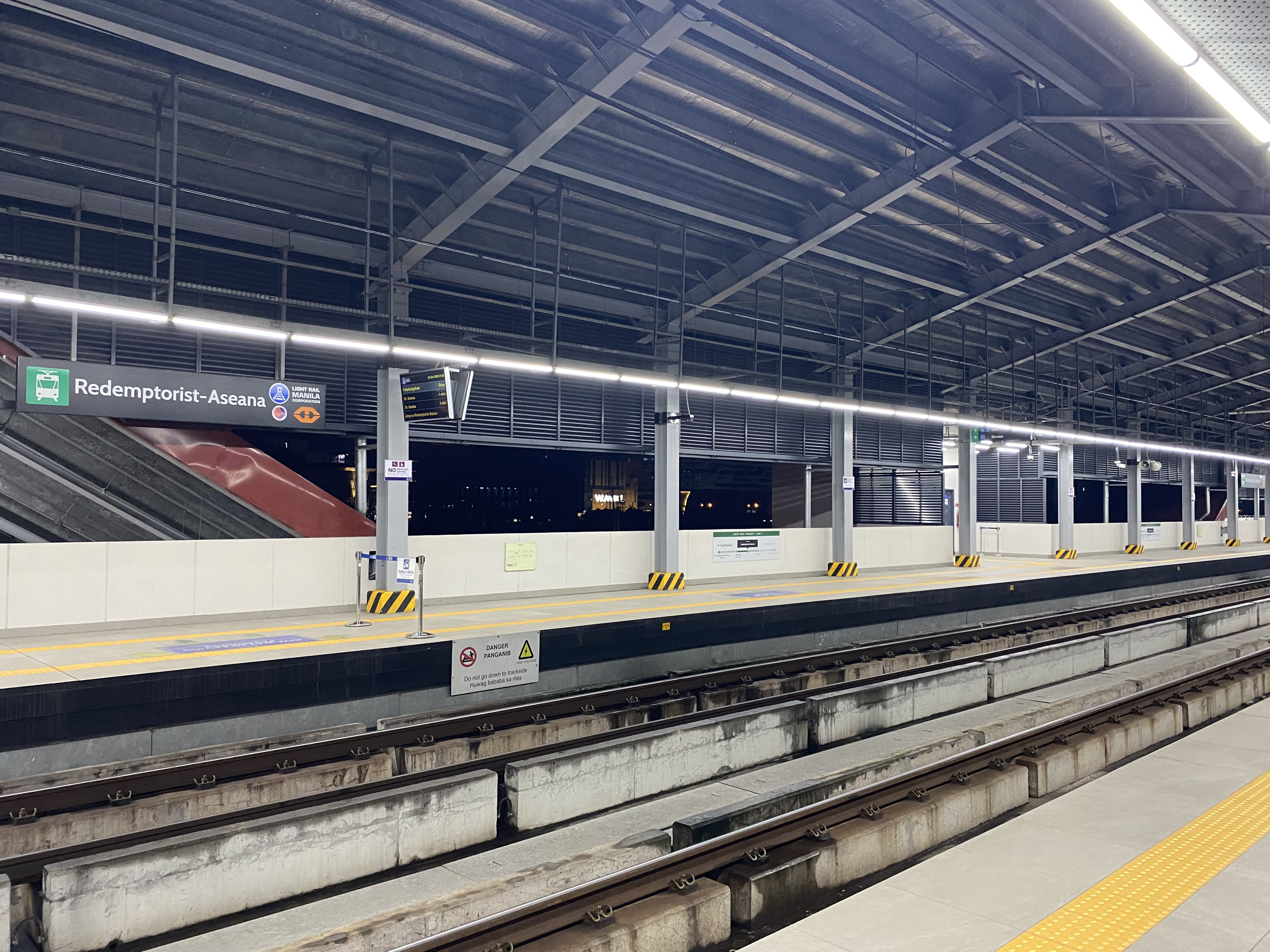

General information
- Other names: Redemptorist, Aseana
- Location: Roxas Boulevard corner Bradco Avenue; Aseana City, Baclaran, Parañaque
- Coordinates: 14°31′49″N 120°59′35″E
- Owner: Light Rail Transit Authority
- Line: Line 1
- Platforms: 2 (2 side)
- Tracks: 2

Construction
- Structure type: Elevated
- Parking: Yes (Roxas Boulevard side parking, Aseana One, Red Planet Manila Aseana City)
- Accessible: Platforms: All platforms

History
- Opened: November 16, 2024; 21 months ago

Services
Preceding station	Manila LRT	Following station
Baclaran towards Fernando Poe Jr.	LRT Line 1	MIA Road towards Dr. Santos
Track layout
Location
- Location within Metro Manila

Redemptorist–Aseana station, also known as Redemptorist station or Aseana station, is an elevated Light Rail Transit (LRT) station located on the LRT Line 1 (LRT-1) system in Parañaque. It is part of the Line 1 Cavite Extension Project, which was opened to the public on November 16, 2024. The station is located in Aseana City in Barangay Baclaran and is also named after the nearby Redemptorist Church, which is also known as the Baclaran Church.

The station is the fifth station for trains headed to Fernando Poe Jr., the twenty-first station for trains headed to Dr. Santos and is one of the five LRT-1 stations in Parañaque; the others are MIA Road, PITX, Ninoy Aquino Avenue and Dr. Santos. The station is the northernmost of the LRT-1 Cavite Extension.

== History ==
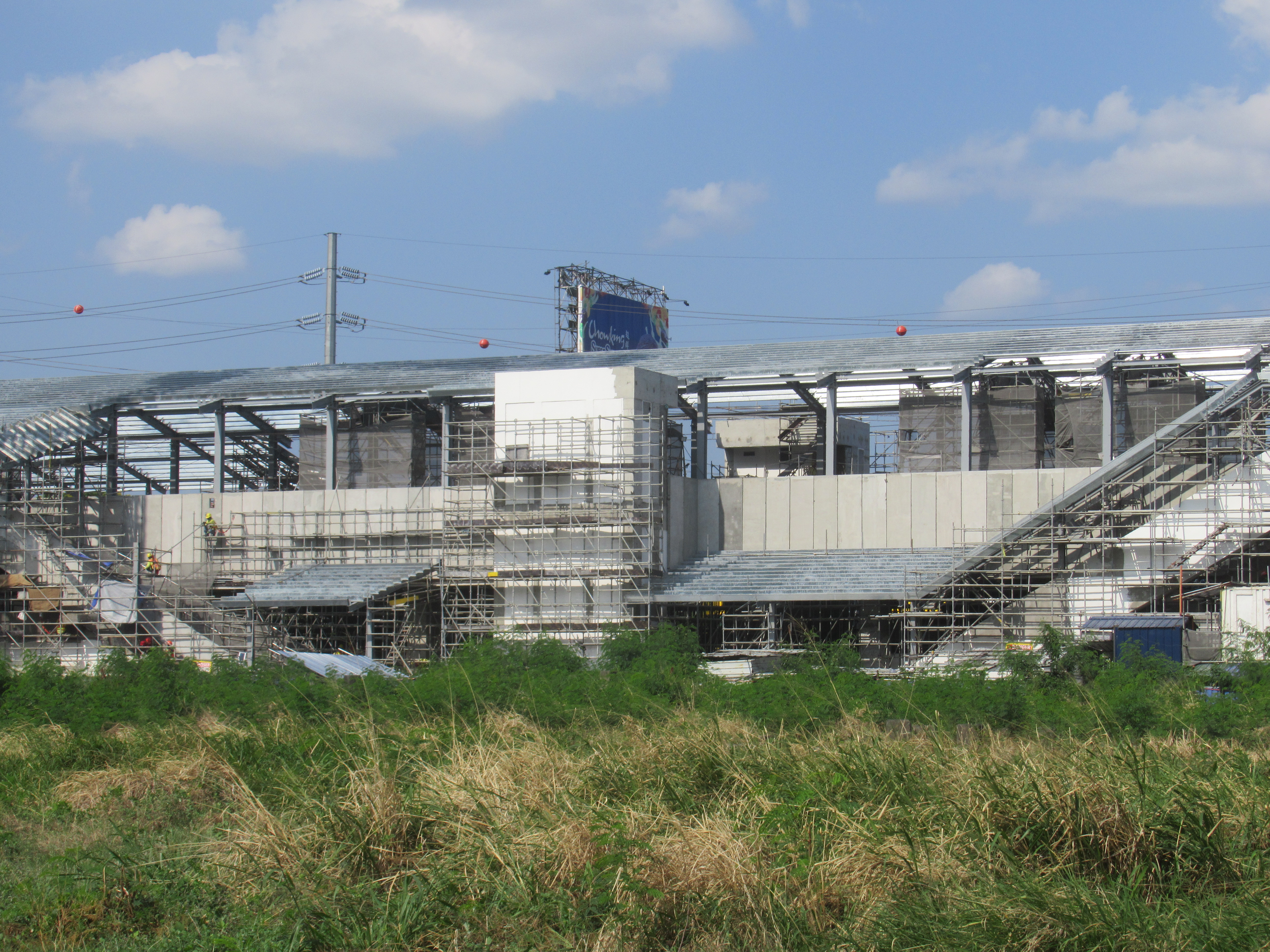
Redemptorist–Aseana station under construction in April 2023

The station, known as Redemptorist station during its inception, was first planned as part of the LRT Line 1 South Extension plan, which calls for a mostly elevated extension of approximately 11.7 kilometers (7.3 mi), with eight stations including this station. The project was first approved on August 25, 2000, and the implementing agreement for the project was approved on January 22, 2002. However, construction for the extension was repeatedly delayed until the project was shelved years later.

The plans for the southern extension project were restarted as early as 2012 during the Aquino administration and was expected to begin construction in 2014 but was delayed due to right of way issues. The issues were resolved in 2016 and the project broke ground on May 4, 2017. Meanwhile, construction works on the south extension began on May 7, 2019, after the right of way acquisitions were cleared. Shortly before the end of its construction, the station was renamed as Redemptorist–Aseana, associating it with its location in the Aseana City development.

On November 15, 2024, Phase 1 of the extension, where the station is part of, was inaugurated by President Bongbong Marcos; the LRMC management announced the start of its commercial operations to be on the following day.

== Transportation links ==
Buses, jeepneys, and UV Express plying Baclaran and Roxas Boulevard serve the station.

Since November 18, 2024, a modern jeepney route connects the station with the MIA Road station and the nearby Ayala Malls Manila Bay, offering free rides.

== Nearby landmarks ==
The station is located in Aseana City, a mixed-use central business district in Parañaque, and is close to Baclaran Church, which is accessible via a pedestrian footbridge. Other locations near the station include Seaside Market Baclaran, S&R Membership Shopping - Aseana, and the Office of Consular Affairs of the Department of Foreign Affairs.

== Gallery ==
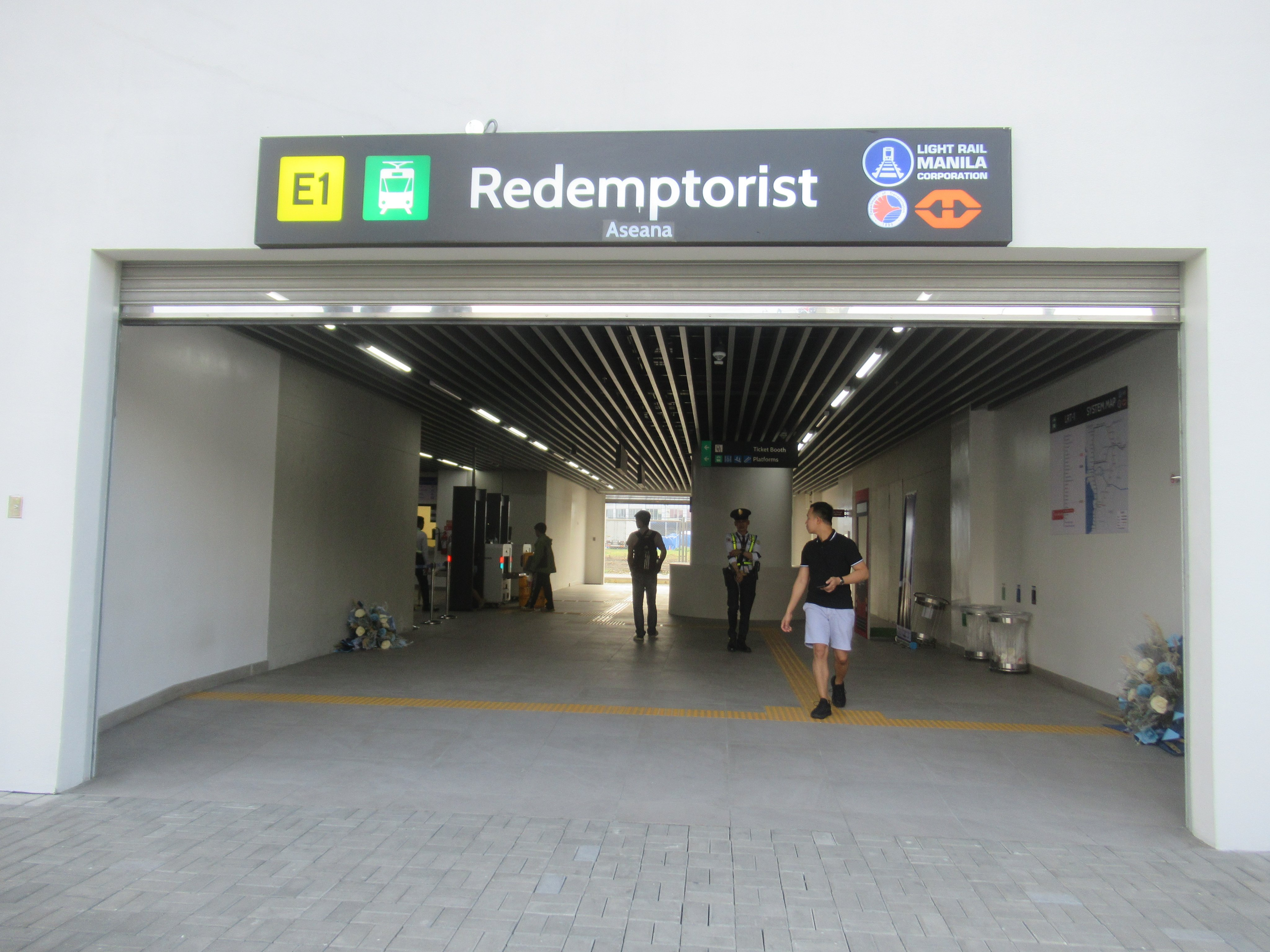
Entrance B

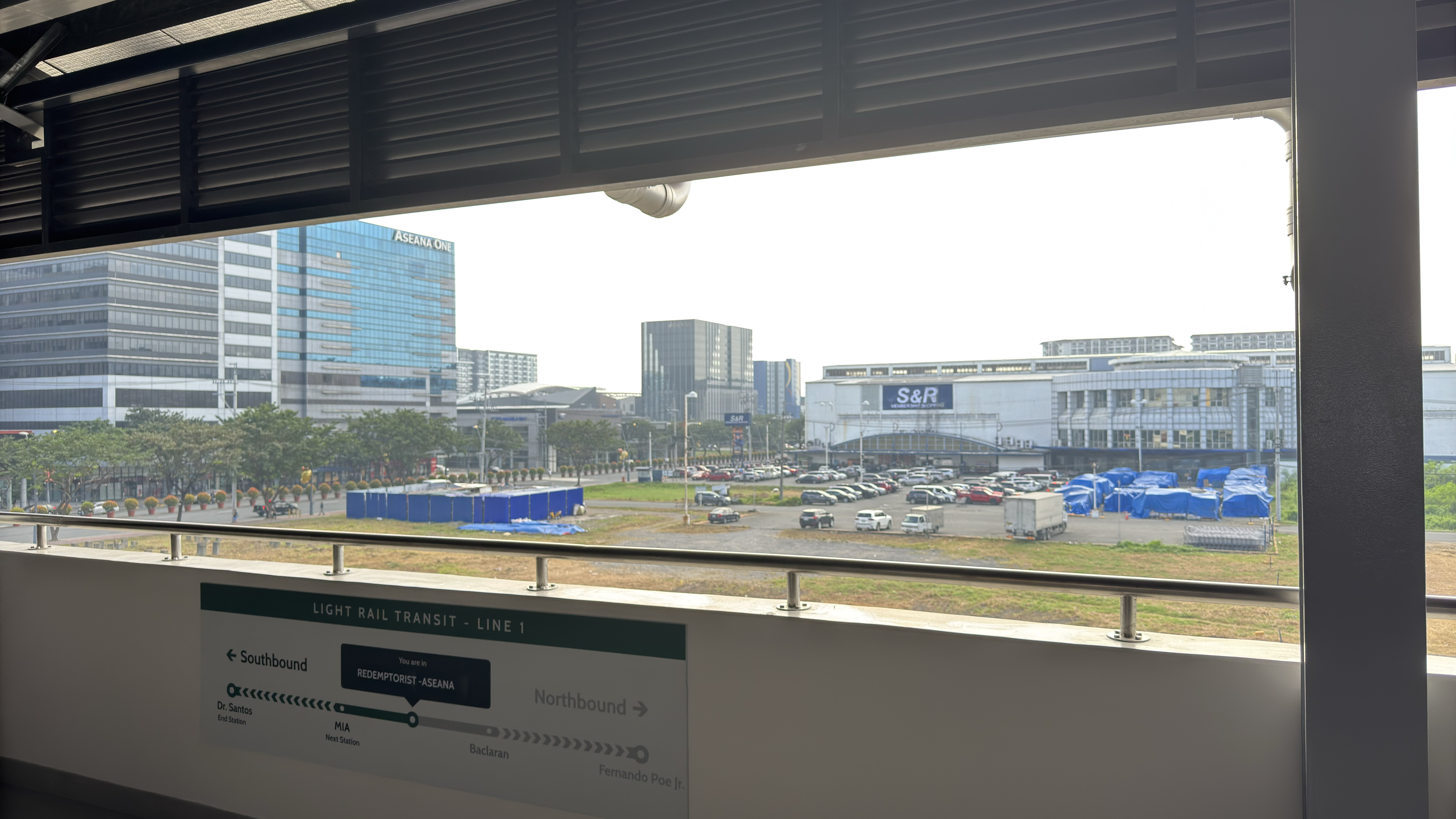
View of Aseana City from the west platform

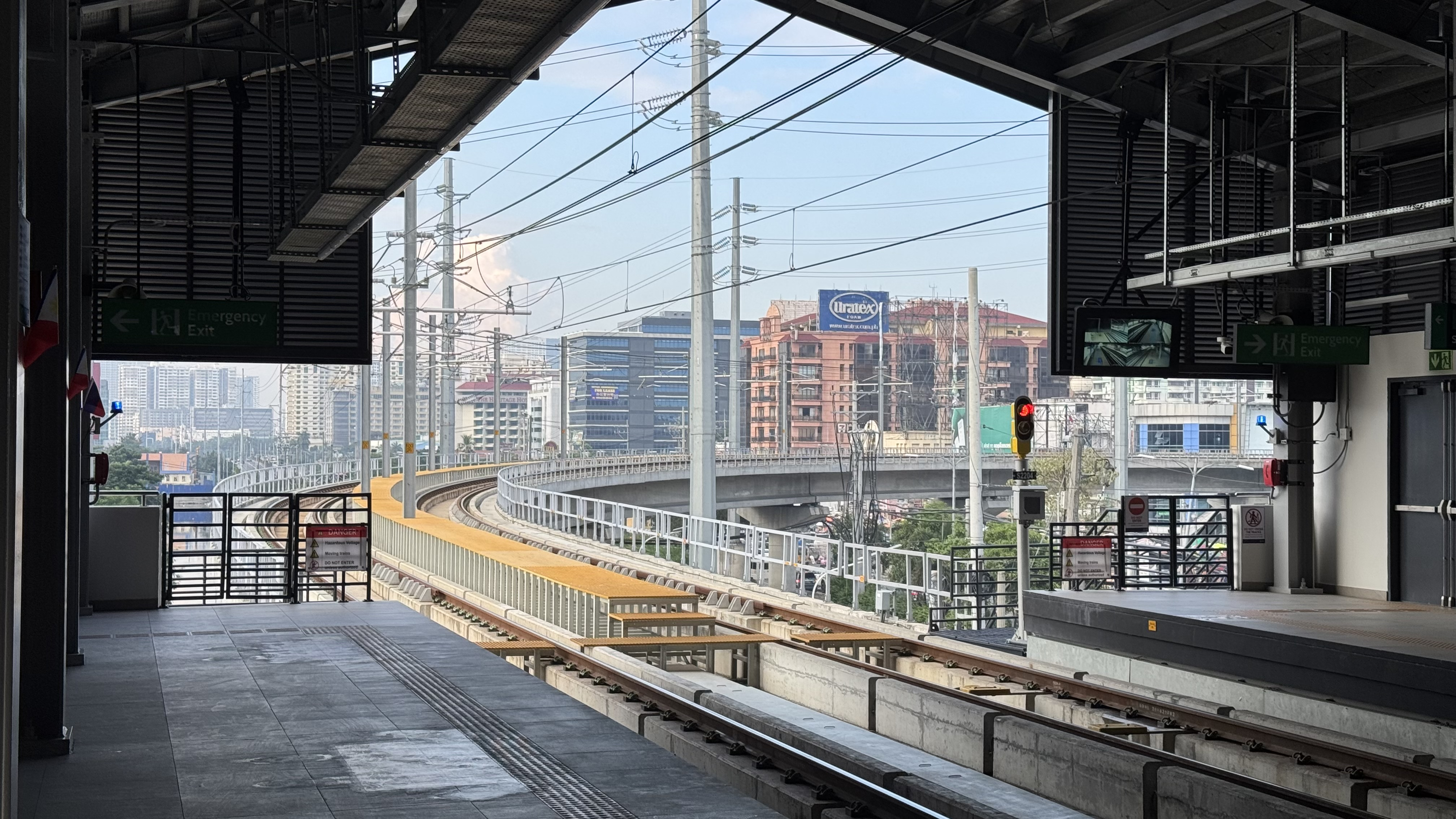
Tracks looking northbound

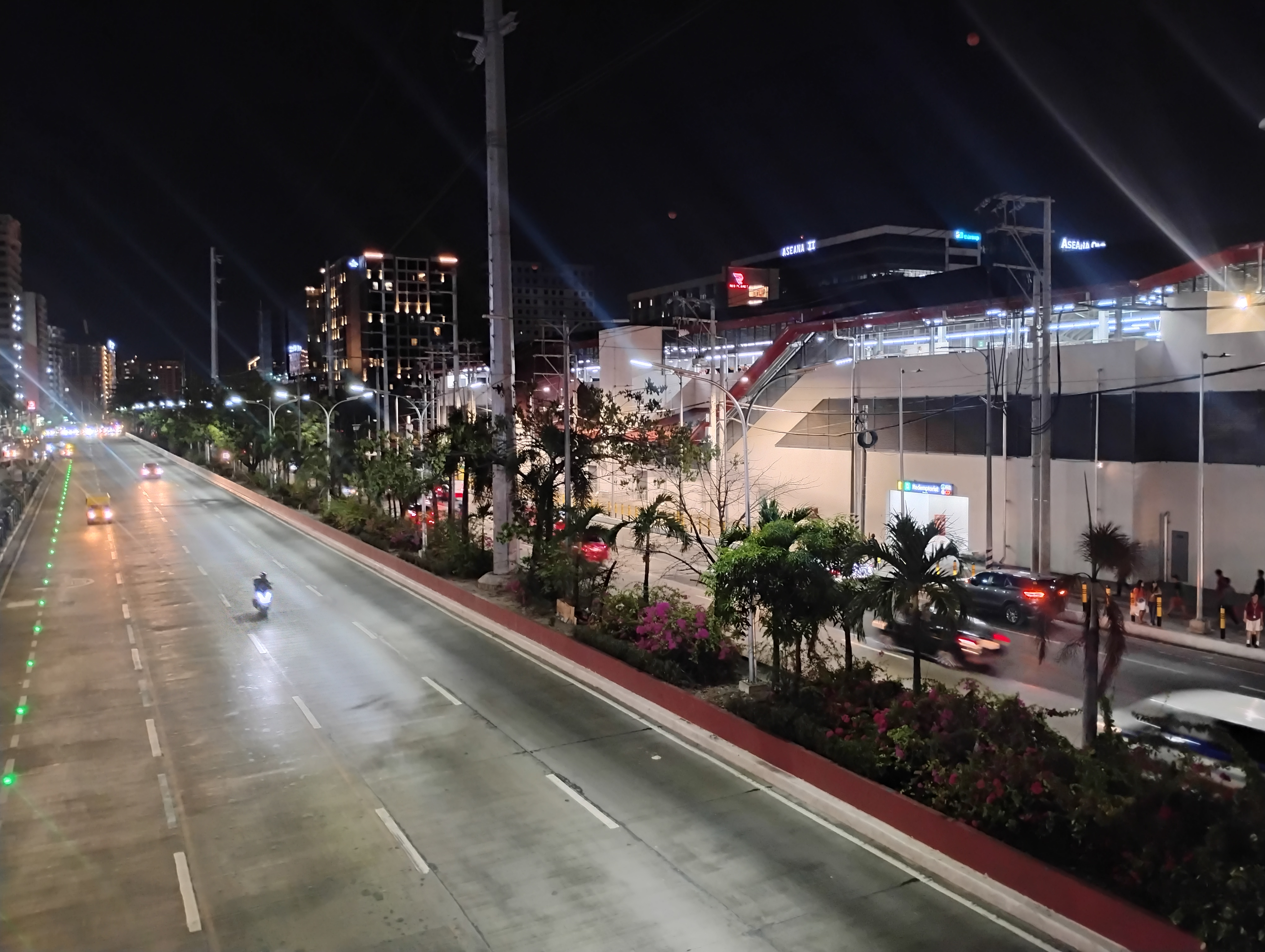
The station along Roxas Boulevard

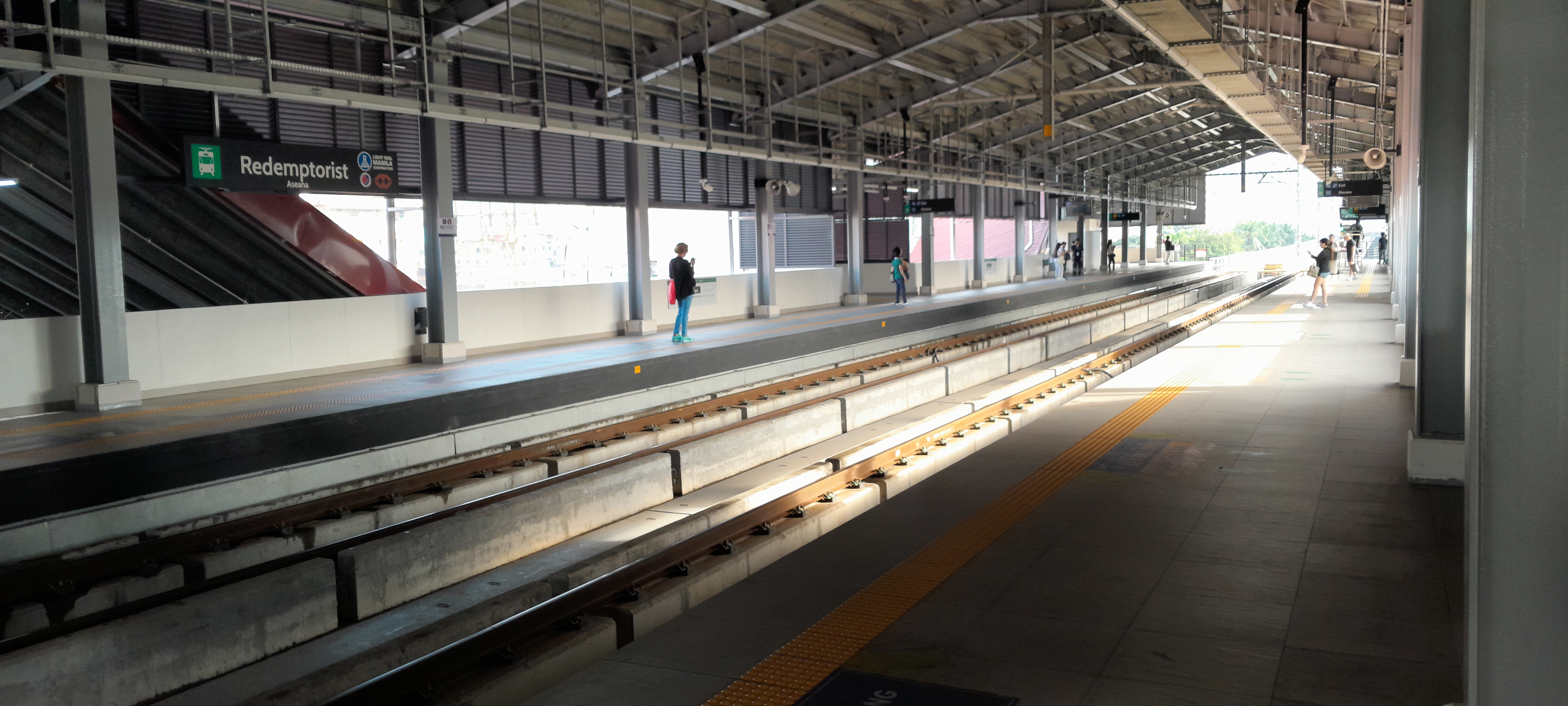
The station with people waiting for a train

== See also ==
- List of Manila LRT and MRT stations
- Manila Light Rail Transit System
