= Dr. Santos station =

Train station in Parañaque, Philippines

Dr. Santos	GL26
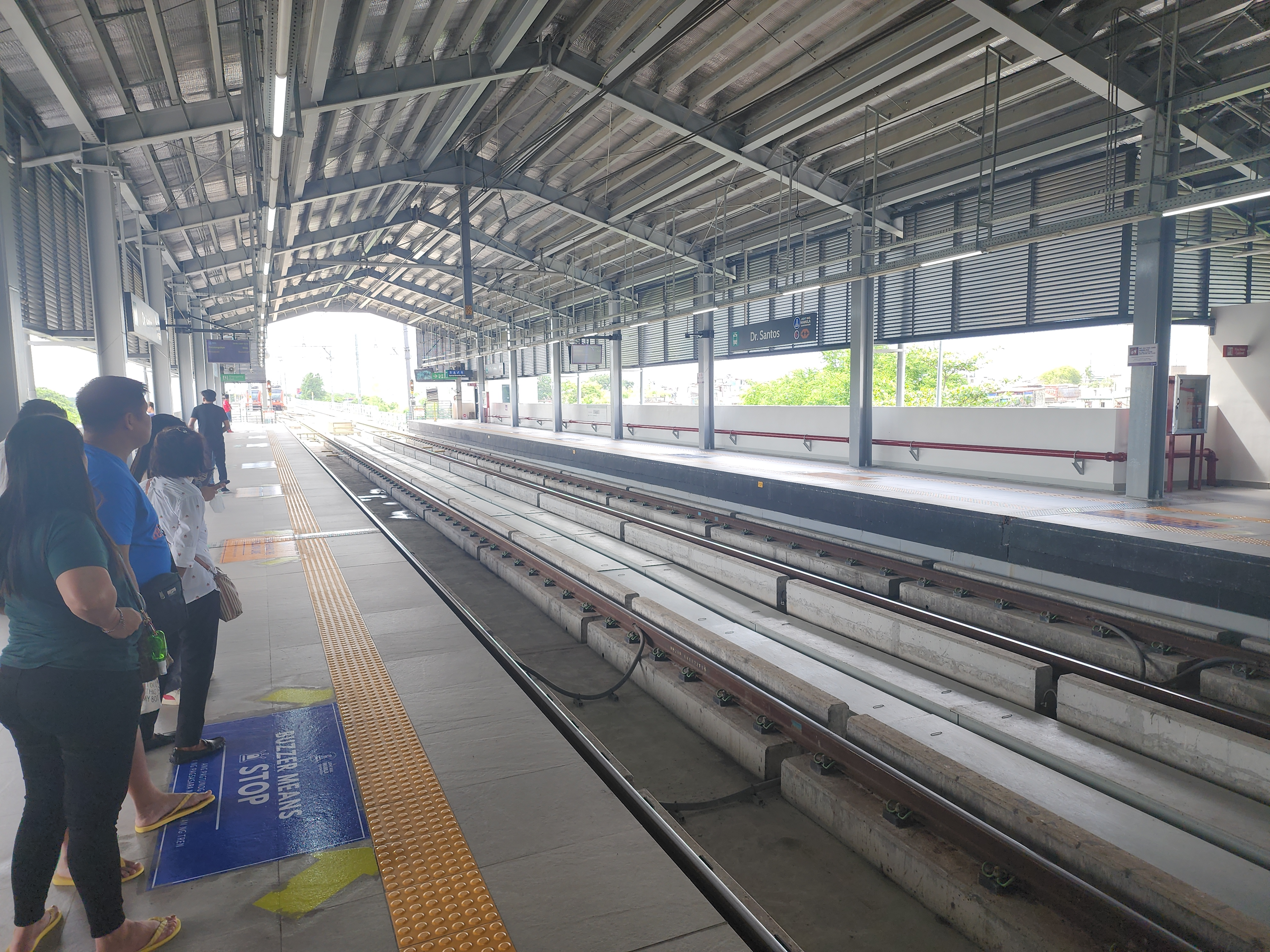

General information
- Other names: Sucat, Dr. Santos Avenue
- Location: San Dionisio, Parañaque
- Coordinates: 14°29′07″N 120°59′22″E
- Owner: Light Rail Transit Authority
- Line: Line 1
- Platforms: 2 (2 side)
- Tracks: 2

Construction
- Structure type: Elevated
- Parking: Yes (Dedicated parking lot, SM City Sucat, intermodal terminal)
- Accessible: yes

History
- Opened: November 16, 2024; 23 months ago

Services
Preceding station	Manila LRT	Following station
Ninoy Aquino Avenue towards Fernando Poe Jr.	LRT Line 1	Terminus
Future service
Ninoy Aquino Avenue towards Fernando Poe Jr.	LRT Line 1	Las Piñas towards Niog
Track layout
Location
- Location within Metro Manila

Dr. Santos station, also known as Sucat station or Dr. Santos Avenue station, is an elevated Light Rail Transit (LRT) station located on the LRT Line 1 (LRT-1) system in Parañaque. The station is part of Phase 1 of the Line 1 Cavite Extension Project, which opened to the public on November 16, 2024. It is situated in between Dr. Santos Avenue, CAVITEX–C-5 Link, and C-5 Extension, a few hundred meters behind SM City Sucat. The station is named after Dr. Santos Avenue and, in turn, Arcadio Santos, a former governor of Rizal who was a native of the present-day city that was part of the province. It is the current southern terminus of the line, pending the opening of the extension's Phase 2 towards Niog in Bacoor expected in 2031.

The station is one of the five LRT-1 stations in Parañaque; the others are Redemptorist–Aseana, MIA Road, PITX, and Ninoy Aquino Avenue.

== History ==
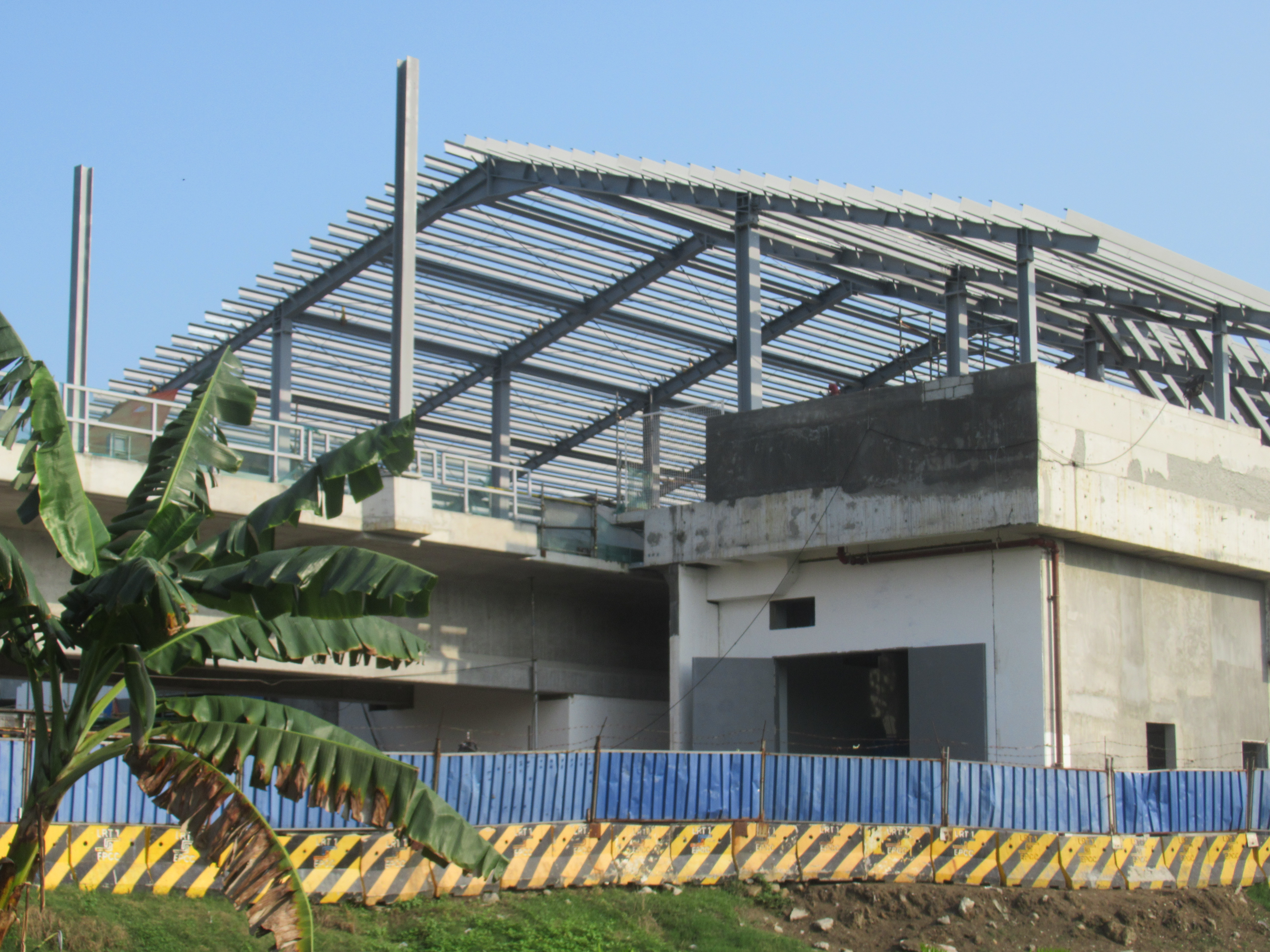
Dr. Santos station under construction in April 2023

Dr. Santos station was first planned as part of the Line 1 South Extension, which calls for a mostly elevated extension of approximately 11.7 kilometers (7.3 mi). The extension will have 8 passenger stations with an option for 2 future stations (Manuyo Uno and Talaba). The project was first approved on August 25, 2000, and the implementing agreement for the project was approved on January 22, 2002. However, construction for the extension was repeatedly delayed until the project was shelved years later.

Station entrance

The plans for the southern extension project were restarted as early as 2012 during the Benigno Aquino III administration and was expected to begin construction in 2014 but was delayed due to right of way issues. The issues were resolved in 2016 and the project broke ground on May 4, 2017. Meanwhile, construction works on the south extension began on May 7, 2019, after the right of way acquisitions were cleared.

On November 15, 2024, Phase 1 of the LRT Line 1 Extension, where the station is part of, was inaugurated by President Bongbong Marcos; the LRMC management announced the start of its commercial operations to be on the following day. It serves as the southern terminus of LRT Line 1, succeeding Baclaran, until the opening of Phase 2, which is expected by 2031.

A dedicated parking lot was opened in October 2026.

=== Proposed renaming ===
On August 14, 2025, the Parañaque City Council passed Resolution No. 2025-230 (004) series of 2025, asking the Light Rail Transit Authority (LRTA) to rename the station as Dr. Arcadio Santos to fully honor the physician-politician from Parañaque after whom the nearby avenue, and in turn the station, is named. This action was taken because local historians stated that the name "Dr. Santos" overlooked an important aspect of the city's identity and councilors see it as a common name. The resolution was later approved by Mayor Edwin Olivarez on September 9, 2025.

== Nearby landmarks ==
Dr. Santos station is adjacent to SM City Sucat shopping mall. It is also near San Dionisio Barangay Hall, Olivarez College, Olivarez General Hospital, and The Premier Medical Center.

== Transportation links ==
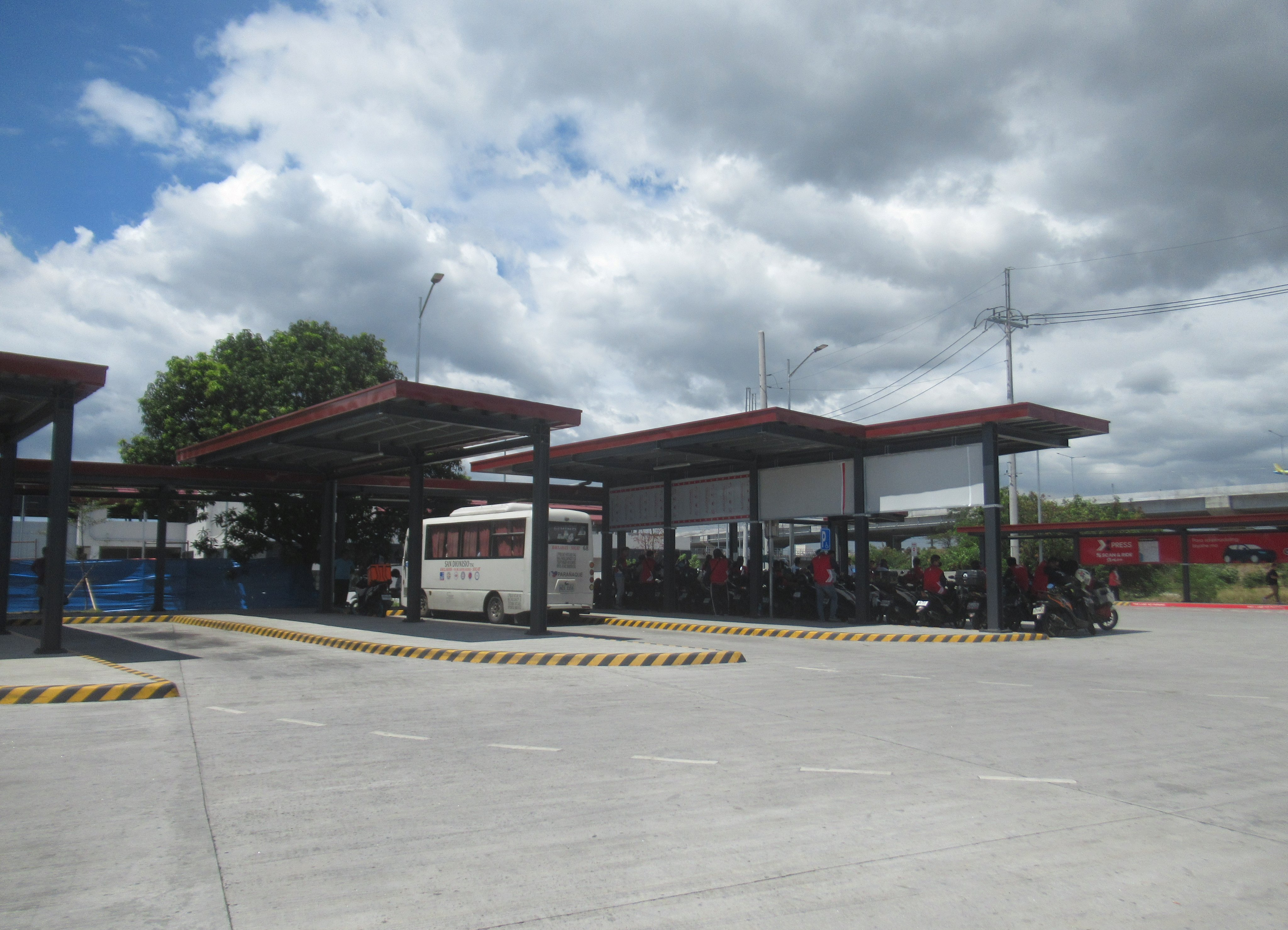
The intermodal transportation terminal next to Dr. Santos station

Dr. Santos station is situated next to an intermodal transport terminal accessible via Dr. Santos Avenue, which accommodates public transportation modes such as jeepneys, buses, taxis, and tricycles.

== See also ==
- List of Manila LRT and MRT stations
- Manila Light Rail Transit System
