= PITX station =

Train station in Parañaque, Philippines

PITX	GL24
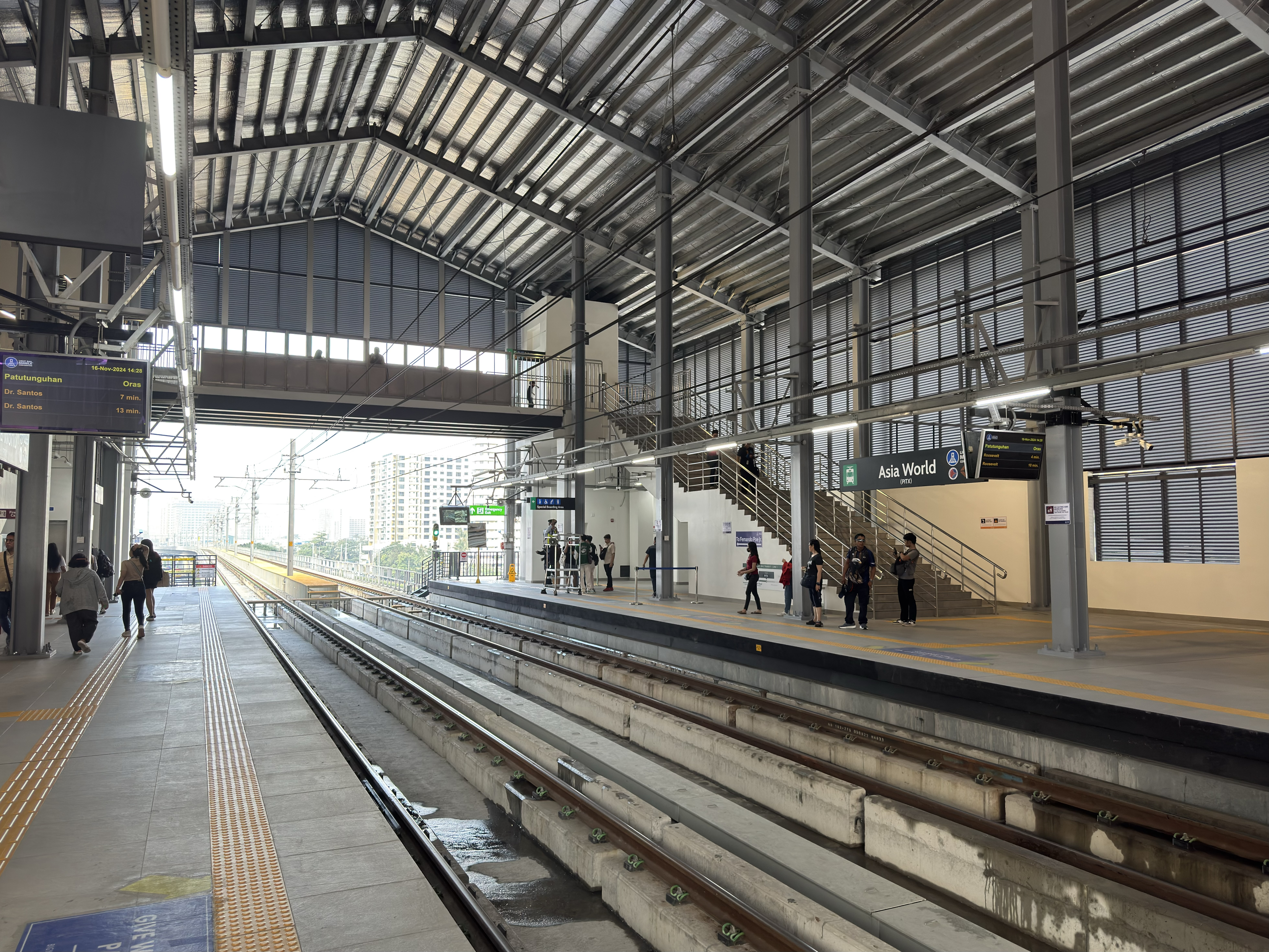

General information
- Other names: Asia World
- Location: Beside Parañaque Integrated Terminal Exchange, Kennedy Road, Don Galo, Parañaque
- Coordinates: 14°30′31″N 120°59′29″E
- Owner: Light Rail Transit Authority
- Line: Line 1
- Platforms: 2 (2 side)
- Tracks: 2
- Bus routes: 1 4 5 6 7 14 18 22 23 26 27 28 29 30 31 32 34 43 47 52 55 via PITX
- Connections: Parañaque Integrated Terminal Exchange; Metro Manila Subway (proposed)

Construction
- Structure type: Elevated
- Parking: Yes (PITX)
- Accessible: Platforms: All platforms

History
- Opened: November 16, 2024; 23 months ago

Services
Preceding station	Manila LRT	Following station
MIA Road towards Fernando Poe Jr.	LRT Line 1	Ninoy Aquino Avenue towards Dr. Santos
Track layout
Location
- Location within Metro Manila

PITX station, also referred to as Asia World station, is an elevated Light Rail Transit (LRT) station located on the LRT Line 1 (LRT-1) system in Parañaque. Named after the adjacent Parañaque Integrated Terminal Exchange (PITX), the station is part of the LRT-1 Cavite Extension Project, which was opened to the public on November 16, 2024. It is situated between the Manila–Cavite Expressway (CAVITEX) and Kennedy Road. It is the third station for trains headed to Fernando Poe Jr., the twenty-third station for trains headed to Dr. Santos, and is one of the five LRT-1 stations in Parañaque; the others are Redemptorist–Aseana, MIA Road, Ninoy Aquino Avenue, and Dr. Santos.

The station accommodates 27,000 people daily as of November 2026, with the heaviest volume recorded between 6:00am and 8:00am. To help ease congestion, passengers will be redirected to the ticket booths at the ground floor.

== History ==
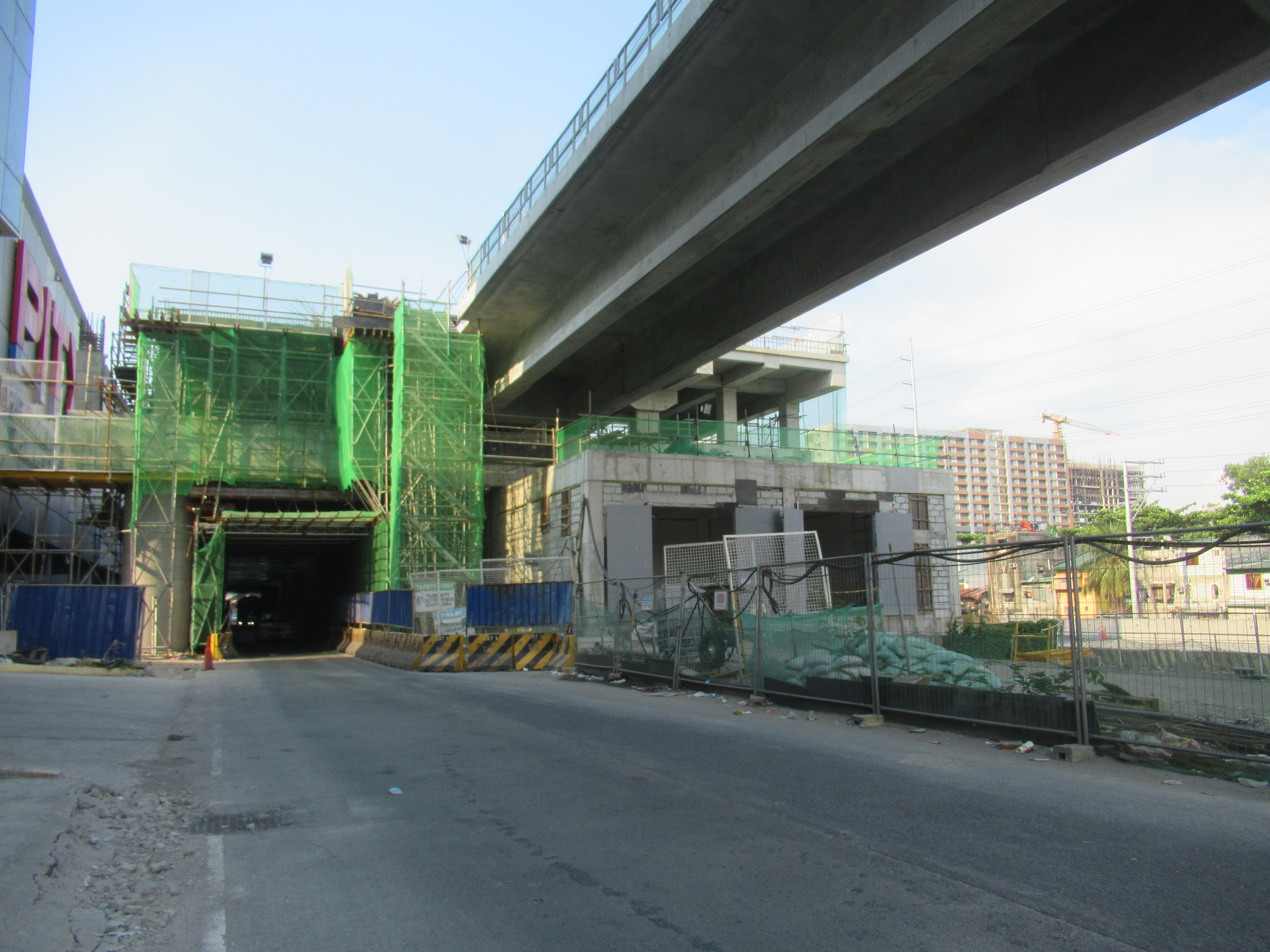
PITX station under construction in April 2023

The station, known as Asia World station (after the Asiaworld development, its location) during its inception, was first planned as part of the Line 1 South Extension plan, which calls for a mostly elevated extension of approximately 11.7 kilometers (7.3 mi). The extension will have 8 passenger stations with an option for 2 future stations (Manuyo Uno and Talaba). The project was first approved on August 25, 2000, and the implementing agreement for the project was approved on January 22, 2002. However, construction for the extension was repeatedly delayed until the project was shelved years later.

The plans for the southern extension project were restarted as early as 2012 during the Benigno Aquino III administration and was expected to begin construction in 2014, but was delayed due to right of way issues. The issues were resolved in 2016 and the project broke ground on May 4, 2017. Meanwhile, construction works on the south extension began on May 7, 2019, after the right of way acquisitions were cleared.

Nearing the end of the construction, the station was officially renamed as PITX station, after the nearby Parañaque Integrated Terminal Exchange (PITX), which was opened in 2018, although the old name is still shown on signages at the station.

On November 15, 2024, Phase 1 of the extension, where the station is part of, was inaugurated by President Bongbong Marcos; the LRMC management announced the start of its commercial operations to be on the following day.

== Station layout ==
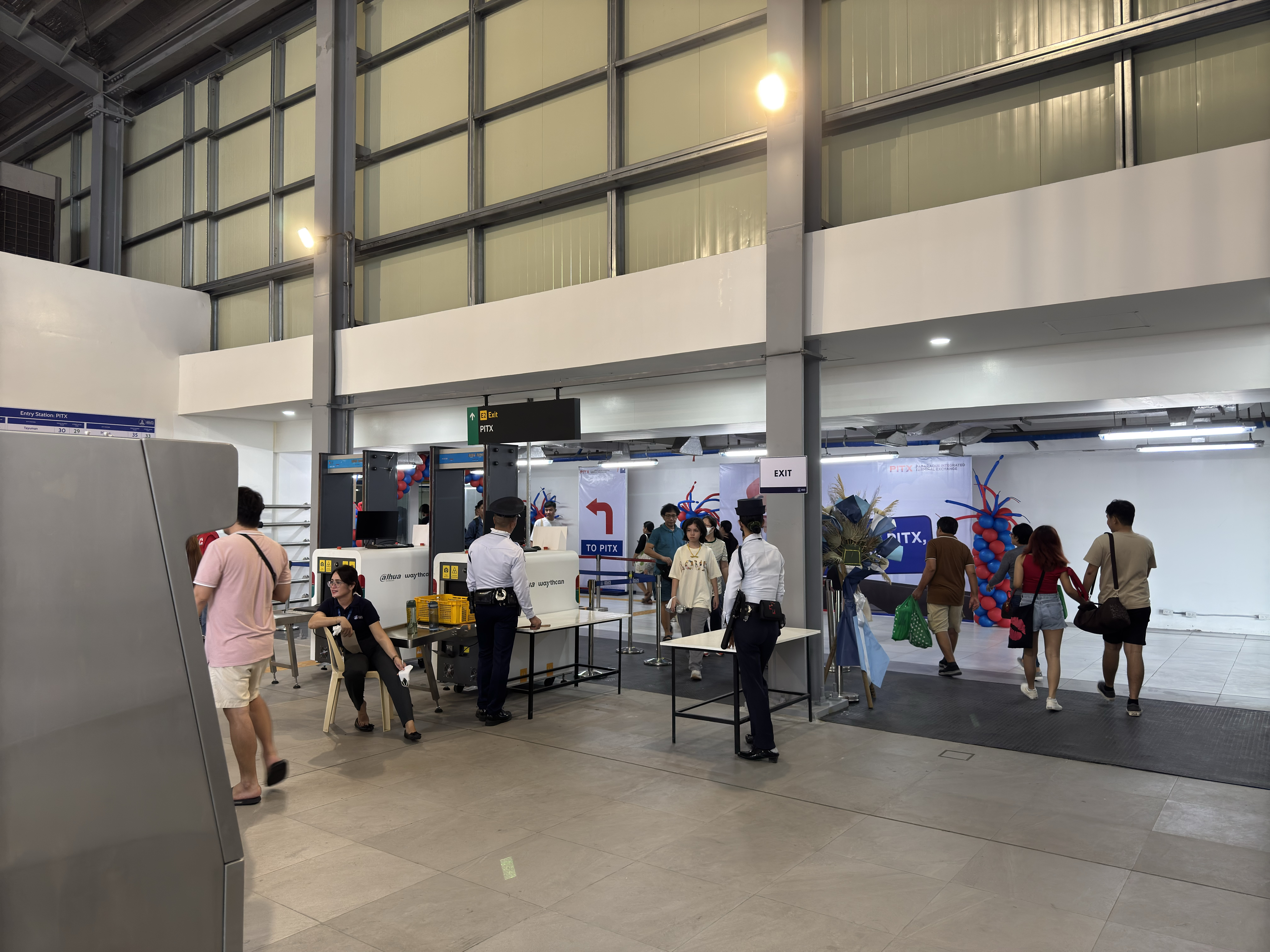
Entrance to PITX

PITX station is accessible from Kennedy Road at ground level or from the third level of PITX, which is linked to the west and east platform. The two platforms are connected by a pedestrian overpass crossing the two tracks inside the station, allowing commuters to catch a train going in the opposite direction without paying a new fare. Staircases, escalators (also installed at other LRT-1 extension stations), and elevators connect the platforms to the concourse on the ground level. Ticket booths are located on the ground-level concourse and next to the east and west platforms, respectively. Public restrooms, lactation room, and first-aid room are also found inside the station.

== Nearby landmarks ==
The station serves as a connection to the intermodal Parañaque Integrated Terminal Exchange (PITX). Hotel Sogo Macapagal, various condominiums and office buildings, and the Marina Bay Town subdivisions, all in Asiaworld, are also located nearby.

== See also ==
- List of Manila LRT and MRT stations
- Manila Light Rail Transit System
