= Ninoy Aquino Avenue station =

Train station in Parañaque, Philippines

Ninoy Aquino Avenue	GL25
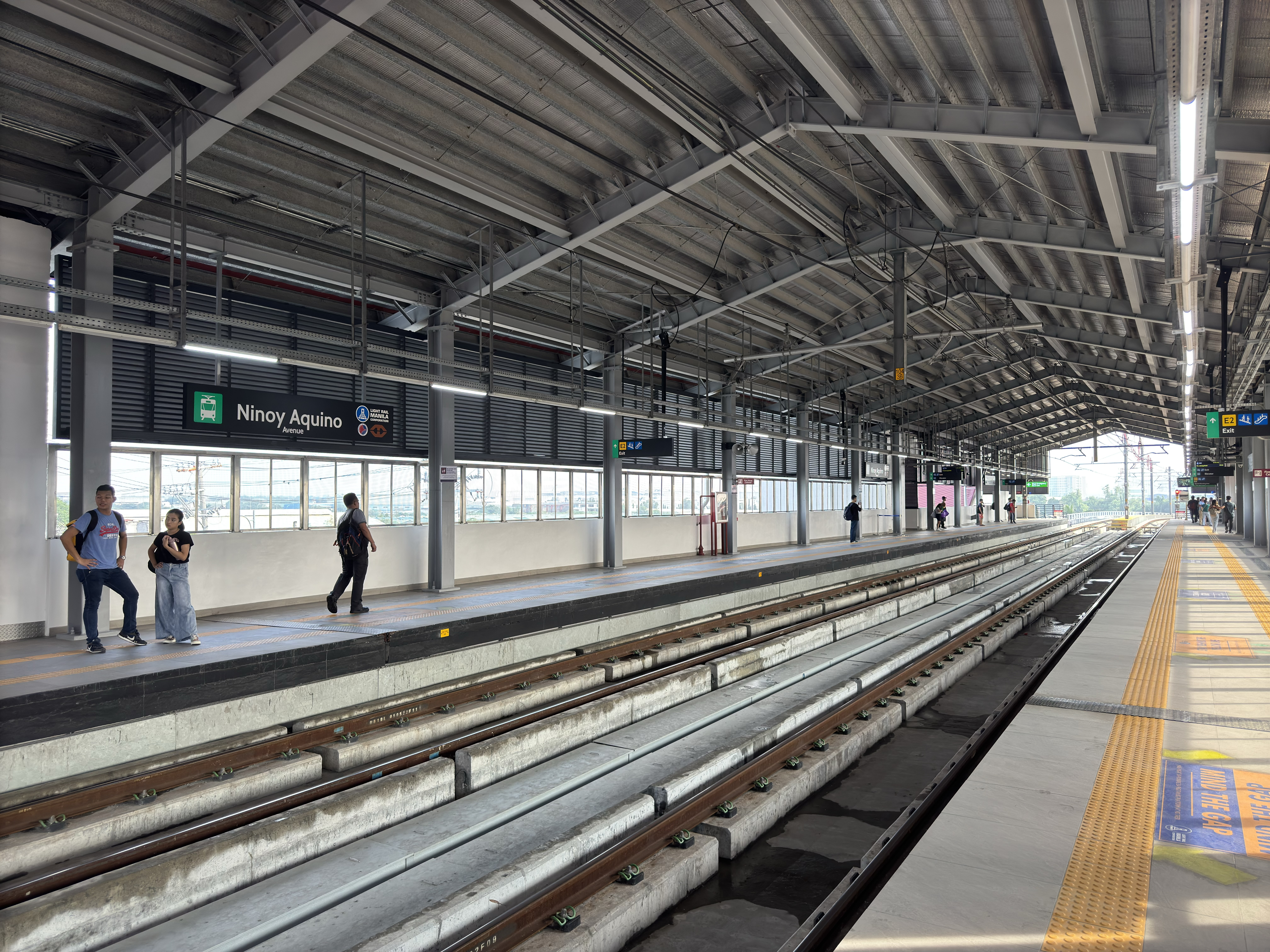

General information
- Other names: Ninoy Aquino; N. Aquino
- Location: Ninoy Aquino Avenue; Santo Niño, Parañaque
- Coordinates: 14°29′55″N 120°59′40″E
- Owner: Light Rail Transit Authority
- Line: Line 1
- Platforms: 2 (2 side)
- Tracks: 2

Construction
- Structure type: Elevated
- Accessible: Platforms: All platforms

History
- Opened: November 16, 2024; 21 months ago

Services
Preceding station	Manila LRT	Following station
PITX towards Fernando Poe Jr.	LRT Line 1	Dr. Santos Terminus
Track layout
Location
- Location within Metro Manila

Ninoy Aquino Avenue station, also simply known as Ninoy Aquino station or N. Aquino station, is an elevated Light Rail Transit (LRT) station located on the LRT Line 1 (LRT-1) system in Santo Niño, Parañaque. The station is part of the Line 1 Cavite Extension Project, which opened to the public on November 16, 2024. The station is built on the east bank of the Parañaque River and is above its namesake, Ninoy Aquino Avenue, which is in turn named after Benigno "Ninoy" Aquino Jr., a former senator who was assassinated at the nearby airport in 1983.

The station is the second station for trains headed to Fernando Poe Jr., the twenty-fourth station for trains headed to Dr. Santos, and is one of the five LRT-1 stations in Parañaque; the others are Redemptorist-Aseana, MIA Road, PITX and Dr. Santos.

== History ==
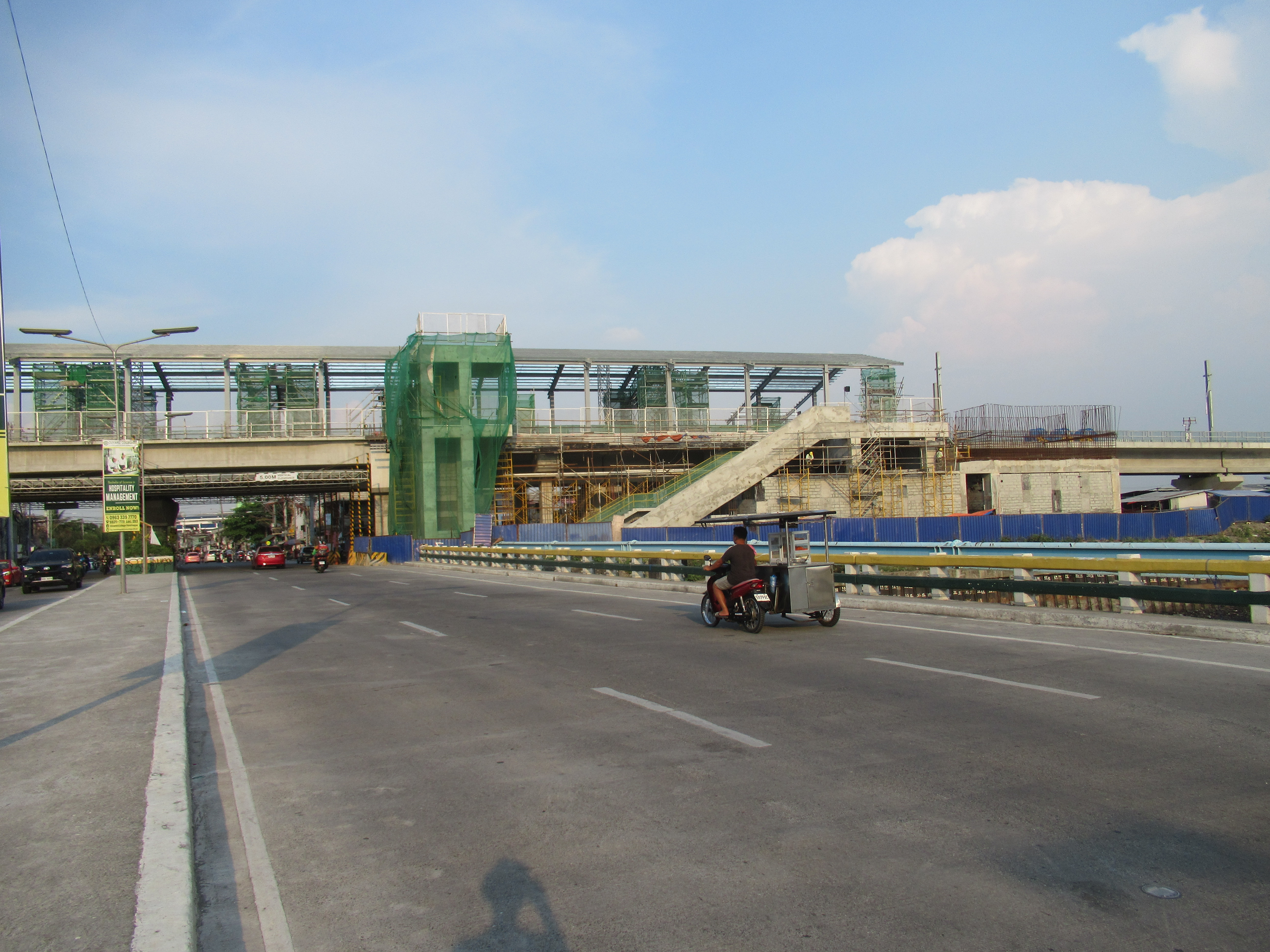
Ninoy Aquino Avenue station under construction in April 2023

Known as Ninoy Aquino station during its inception, the station was first planned as a part of the Line 1 South Extension plan, which calls for a mostly elevated extension of approximately 11.7 kilometers (7.3 mi). The extension will have 8 passenger stations with an option for 2 future stations (Manuyo Uno and Talaba). The project was first approved on August 25, 2000, and the implementing agreement for the project was approved on January 22, 2002. However, construction for the extension was repeatedly delayed until the project was shelved years later.

The plans for the southern extension project were restarted as early as 2012 during the Benigno Aquino III administration and was expected to begin construction in 2014, but was delayed due to right of way issues. The issues were resolved in 2016 and the project broke ground on May 4, 2017. Meanwhile, construction works on the south extension began on May 7, 2019, after the right of way acquisitions were cleared. Initially planned to be built near the west bank of the Parañaque River in Don Galo, the station was built on the river's east bank in Santo Niño, next to the Santo Niño Bridge. This aligned with the route's alignment along the river to prevent the demolition of existing structures.

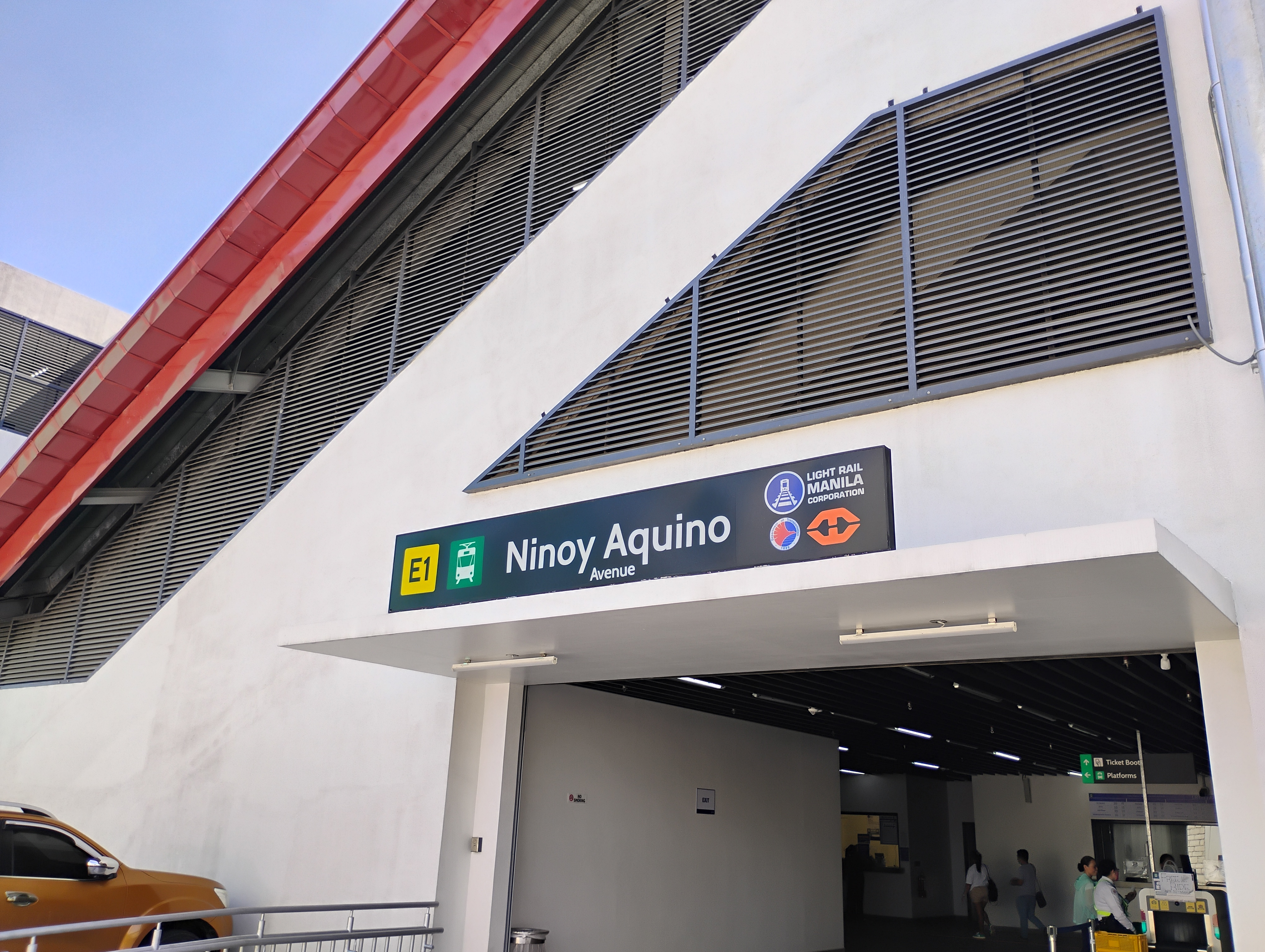
Station entrance

Nearing the end of its construction in 2024, the station was later renamed Ninoy Aquino Avenue station, specifically after the avenue crossing beneath it. On November 15, 2024, Phase 1 of the LRT Line 1 Extension, where the station is part of, was inaugurated by President Bongbong Marcos; the LRMC management announced the start of its commercial operations to be on the following day.

== Nearby landmarks ==
The station is nearby the Global Airport Business Park Gate 1 along Ninoy Aquino Avenue and other air cargo logistics provider warehouse such as F2 Logistics. The station is also near the Terminal 1 of Ninoy Aquino International Airport, the Duty Free Philippines Fiestamall store, Parañaque Cathedral, barangay La Huerta, S&R Membership Shopping Parañaque branch, and Gedcor Square Building, whose tenants are mostly forwarding companies. It is also easily accessible to educational institutions such as Parañaque Science High School, Santo Niño National High School, La Huerta Elementary School, and Polytechnic University of the Philippines Parañaque, Parañaque Central Post Office, and the residential areas of Barangays Santo Niño and La Huerta in Parañaque. It is the sole station along Ninoy Aquino Avenue before it crosses over to Dr. Santos Avenue.

== Transportation links ==
The station is accessible to passengers who wish to transfer to road PUVs such as jeepneys and UV Express. Jeepneys ply the Baclaran–Sucat and Sucat–Lawton (or Sucat–Lawton via Mall of Asia) routes. Destinations include Ninoy Aquino International Airport (NAIA), Manila, Pasay, Parañaque, and Muntinlupa.

== See also ==
- List of Manila LRT and MRT stations
- Manila Light Rail Transit System
