= LRTA 13000 class =

4th-generation rolling stock operating at LRT-1

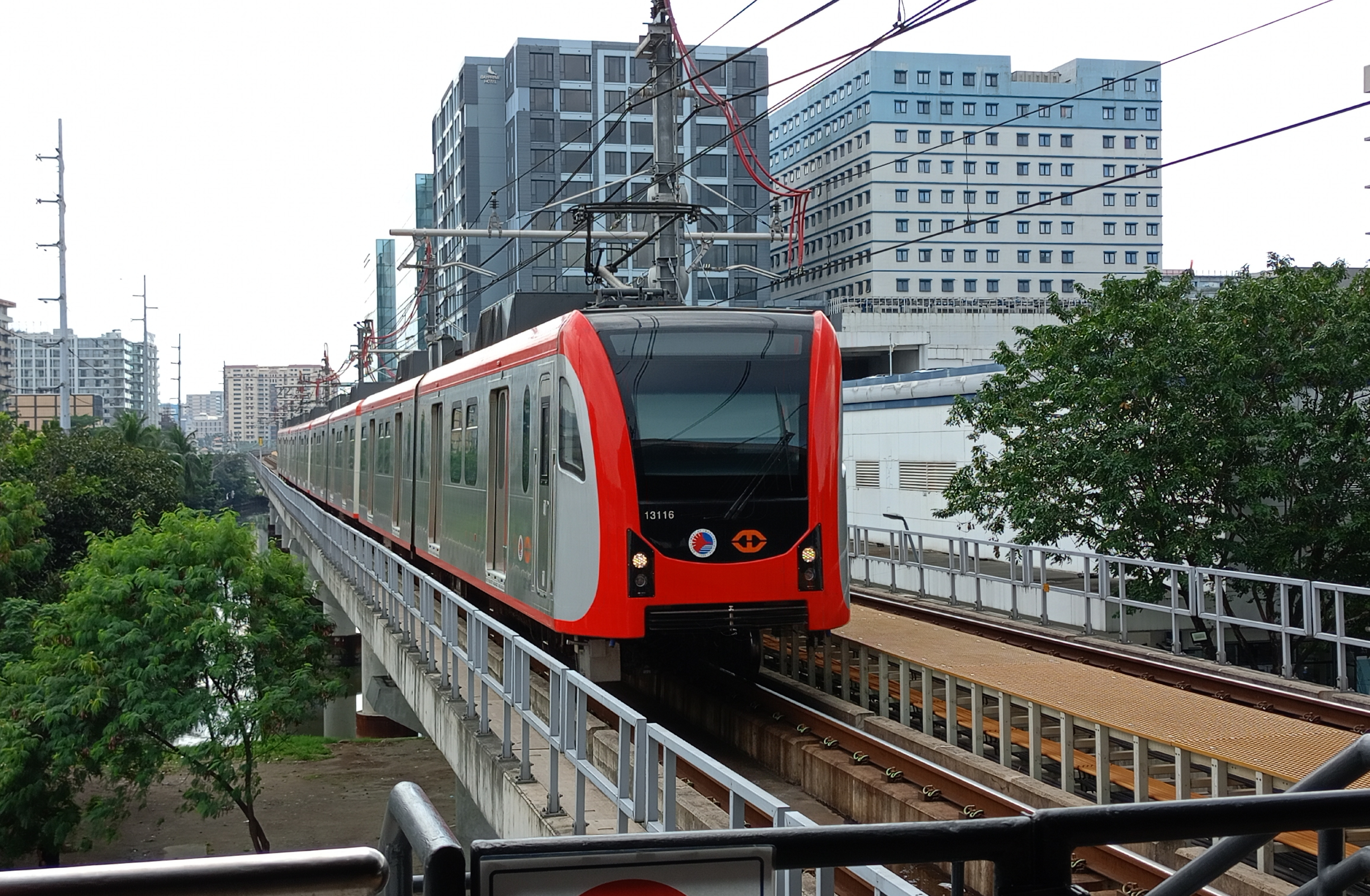
- A 13000 class train at Redemptorist–Aseana station
- Stock type: Light rail vehicle
- In service: 2023–present
- Manufacturer: CAF
- Assembly: Navarre, Spain; Huehuetoca, Mexico
- Family name: Urbos
- Replaced: 1000 class
- Constructed: 2019–2022
- Entered service: July 20, 2023; 3 years ago
- Number built: 120 vehicles (30 sets)
- Number in service: 120 vehicles (30 sets)
- Formation: 4 cars per trainset (Mc–M–M–Mc)
- Fleet numbers: 13001–13120
- Capacity: 1,388 per train (264 seats, 4 wheelchair spaces)
- Operator: Light Rail Manila Corporation
- Depots: Baclaran, Zapote (future)
- Line served: Line 1

Specifications
- Car body construction: Stainless steel
- Train length: 106 m (347 ft 9 15/64 in)
- Car length: 26.5 m (86 ft 11 5/16 in)
- Width: 2.59 m (8 ft 5 31/32 in)
- Height: 3.91 m (12 ft 9 15/16 in)
- Floor height: 0.92 m (3 ft 7/32 in)
- Platform height: 0.69 m (2 ft 3 11/64 in)
- Doors: Double-leaf pocket-type; 4 per side 1.5 m × 1.9 m (59 in × 75 in)
- Articulated sections: 2
- Wheel diameter: 660–600 mm (26–24 in) (new–worn)
- Wheelbase: 1.9 m (6 ft 3 in)
- Maximum speed: 70 km/h (43 mph) (design); 60 km/h (37 mph) (service)
- Weight: 37.4 t (82,000 lb) (Mc); 36.5 t (80,000 lb) (M)
- Axle load: 10.5 t (23,000 lb)
- Steep gradient: 4%
- Traction system: Mitsubishi Electric IGBT–VVVF inverter
- Traction motors: 4 × 105 kW (141 hp) 3-phase AC induction
- Power output: 420 kW (563 hp) per LRV; 1.68 MW (2,253 hp) (4 cars)
- Transmission: Westinghouse-Natal (WN) drive; 2-stage reduction
- Gear ratio: 7.48:1
- Acceleration: 1 m/s^{2} (2.24 mph/s)
- Deceleration: 1.3 m/s^{2} (2.91 mph/s)
- Auxiliaries: Static inverter; Low-power DC voltage supply; Batteries
- HVAC: Roof-mounted duct-type air conditioning
- Electric systems: 750 V DC overhead catenary
- Current collection: Schunk single-arm pantograph
- UIC classification: Bo′+2′+Bo′
- Bogies: Inside-frame type
- Minimum turning radius: 25 m (82 ft)
- Braking systems: Regenerative, rheostatic, and electro-pneumatic
- Safety system: Alstom Atlas 100 ETCS-1 with subsystem of ATP
- Coupling system: Semi-permanent
- Seating: Longitudinal
- Track gauge: 1,435 mm (4 ft 8 1/2 in) standard gauge

Notes/references
- Sourced from unless otherwise noted.

The LRTA 13000 class is a class of fourth-generation high-floor light rail vehicles (LRV) of the Light Rail Transit Authority servicing Manila's LRT Line 1, manufactured by CAF. Purchased in 2017 with Japanese funding as part of the Cavite extension of the line, the trains entered service in July 2023 to replace the aging first-generation 1000 class trains.

It is the first LRV in the system with 5 digits in the body number due to the class fleet exceeding 99 units, in comparison to the older fleet.

== History ==
=== Purchase ===
In 2013, feasibility studies were conducted by the Japan International Cooperation Agency (JICA) for a southward extension of the LRT Line 1 to Cavite. It determined that once the extension was completed, sixty-one trains would be required for operation, but thirty-one of those are existing ones. Therefore, JICA proposed the purchase of thirty new trains to meet growing demand.

On October 16, 2015, the Department of Transportation and Communications (DOTC) invited train manufacturers to tender for the purchase of 120 light rail vehicles; Japanese companies were only allowed to bid. It subsequently identified Marubeni and Sumitomo Corporation as prospective bidders. However, in April 2016, the DOTC announced a failed bidding as none of them submitted proposals.

On December 28, 2016, DOTC's successor, the Department of Transportation (DOTr), called for bids again. Two bidders showed up: Marubeni with Hyundai Rotem, and Mitsubishi Corporation with Construcciones y Auxiliar de Ferrocarriles (CAF). The latter won the JPY 30 billion (PHP 14.1 billion) contract on November 19, 2017, and the contract was signed on December 1. These trains are expected to gradually replace the aging 1000 class which has been in use since the opening of the line in 1984 and has undergone three refurbishments.

Mitsubishi implemented the contract and supplied the trains while CAF manufactured the trains. The new trains were funded by Japan's official development assistance.

=== Production and commissioning ===
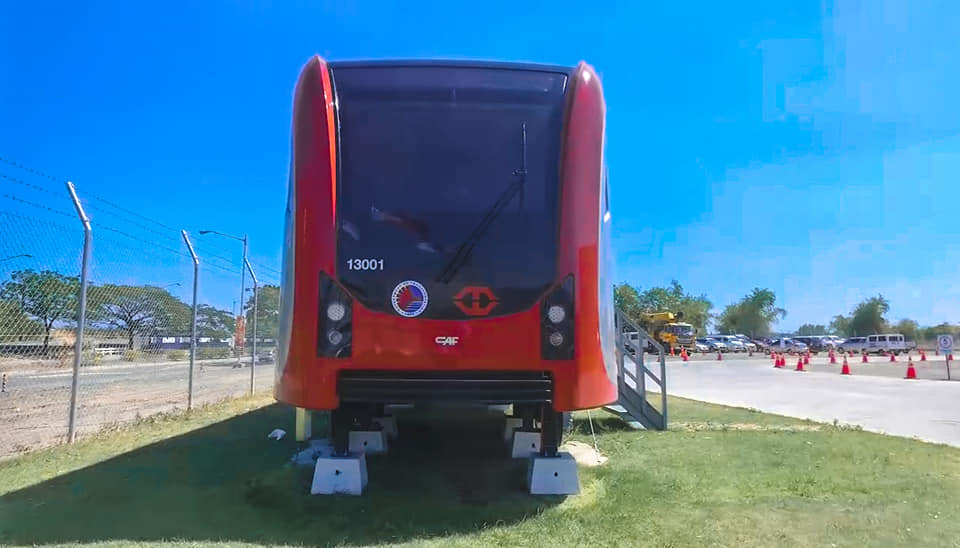
Mock-up model of the 13000 class

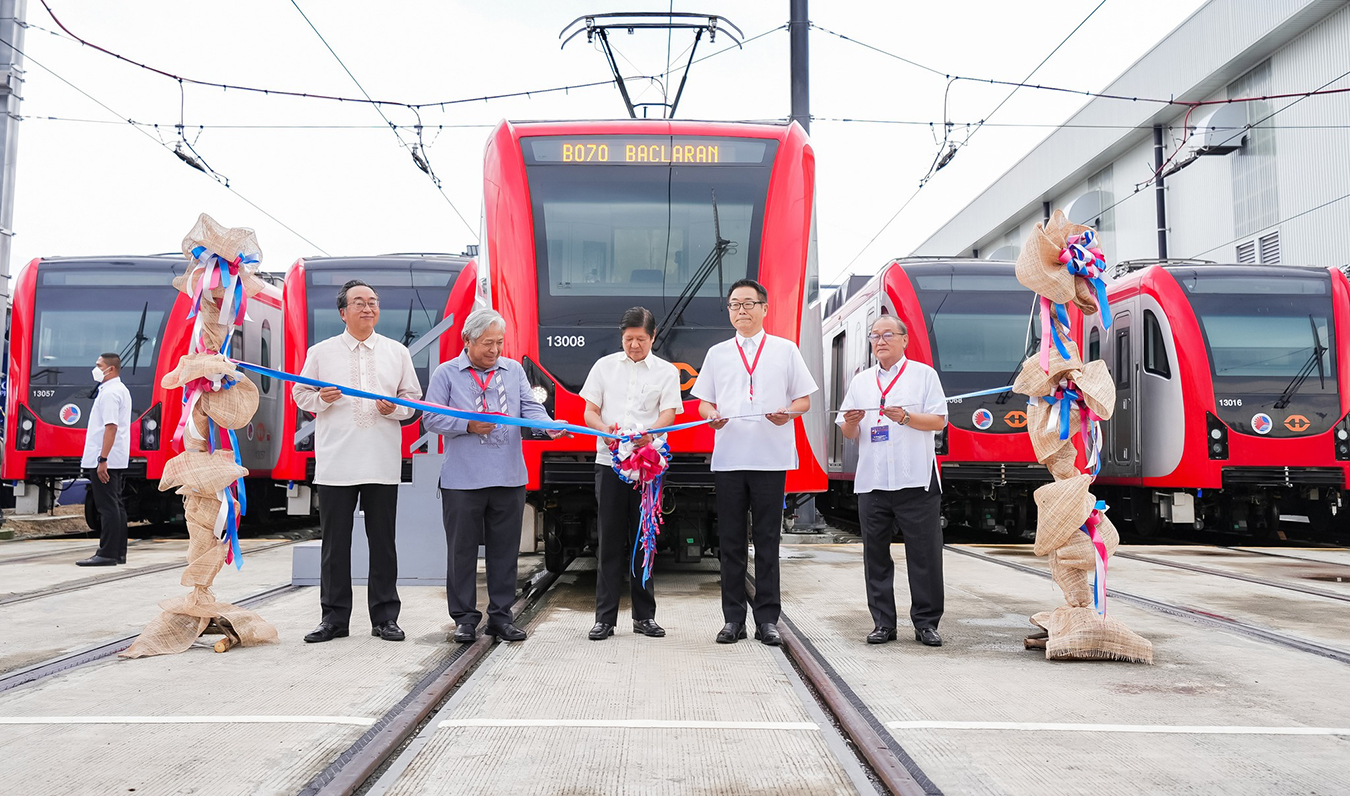
President Bongbong Marcos (center) leads the ribbon-cutting ceremony and inauguration of the 13000 class trains on July 19, 2023.

Officials of the Department of Transportation (DOTr) unveiled a full-scale mock-up model of the 13000 class train on May 7, 2019.

The first two sets (8 cars) were initially planned to be delivered in July 2020, however the delivery of the train sets were delayed due to the COVID-19 pandemic.

On January 18, 2021, the first batch of deliveries, consisting of the first trainset (4 cars consisting of two articulated cars each) arrived at the Port of Manila. These were unveiled to the public the following January 26. This trainset was then transported to Baclaran Depot in February.

The first trainset underwent static tests at the depot on September 15, 2021, followed by dynamic tests along the mainline on September 25. The trains then underwent 1,000-kilometer (620 mi) test runs conducted by the Light Rail Manila Corporation on May 4, 2022. Initially expected to enter in-service operations by the end of the month, the initial deadline was not met.

On July 19, 2023, the trains were inaugurated by President Bongbong Marcos. The first train set entered revenue service the next day, with others following suit in the succeeding weeks.

=== Water leaks ===
A few months before the trains entered service, Transportation Undersecretary for Railways Cesar Chavez disclosed on February 16, 2023, that water leaks were found in eighty LRVs that were delivered to the Philippines. He further disclosed that as a result, these could not be used in mainline operations, and the government suspended payments to Mitsubishi and CAF in July 2022.

Chavez admitted that as a result of travel restrictions caused by the pandemic, the DOTr was unable to send inspection teams to inspect the trains for any defects, while these were still undergoing factory acceptance tests. These defects were later fixed through a comprehensive roof rectification plan.

== Design ==
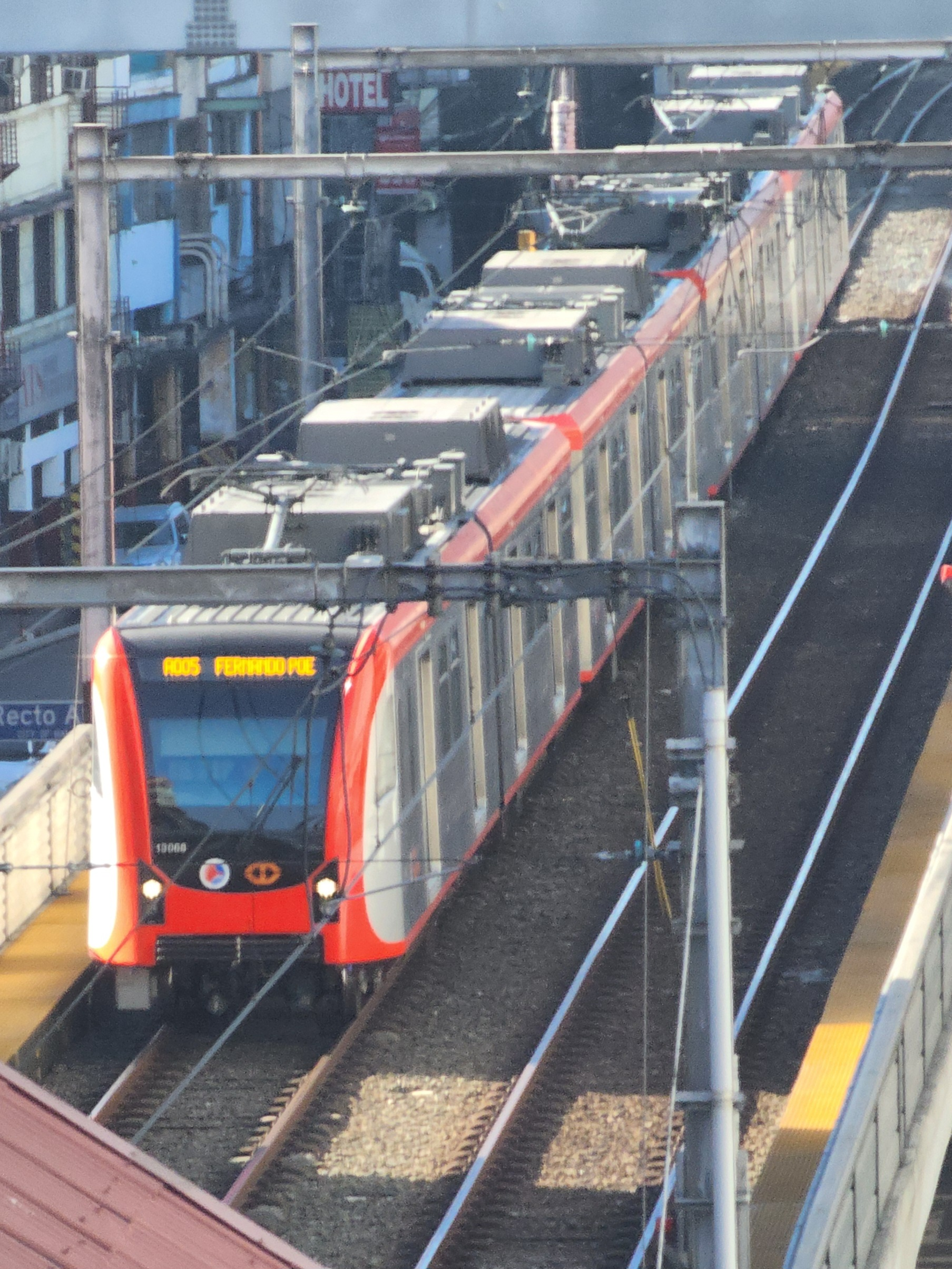
13000 class train at Doroteo Jose in February 2024

The 13000 class shares the 6-axle design present in the 1100 and 1200 class, consisting of two articulated cars. These are mainly operated in sets of four, and are capable of operating at a two- or three-car configuration under special circumstances.

=== Car body ===
The train car body is made of stainless steel. Each vehicle has four pocket doors per side. Initially, the trains were to sport a silver-yellow livery, but was changed to crimson and silver after the mock-up model was unveiled in 2019. The trains also feature LED destination panels, like the 1200 class.

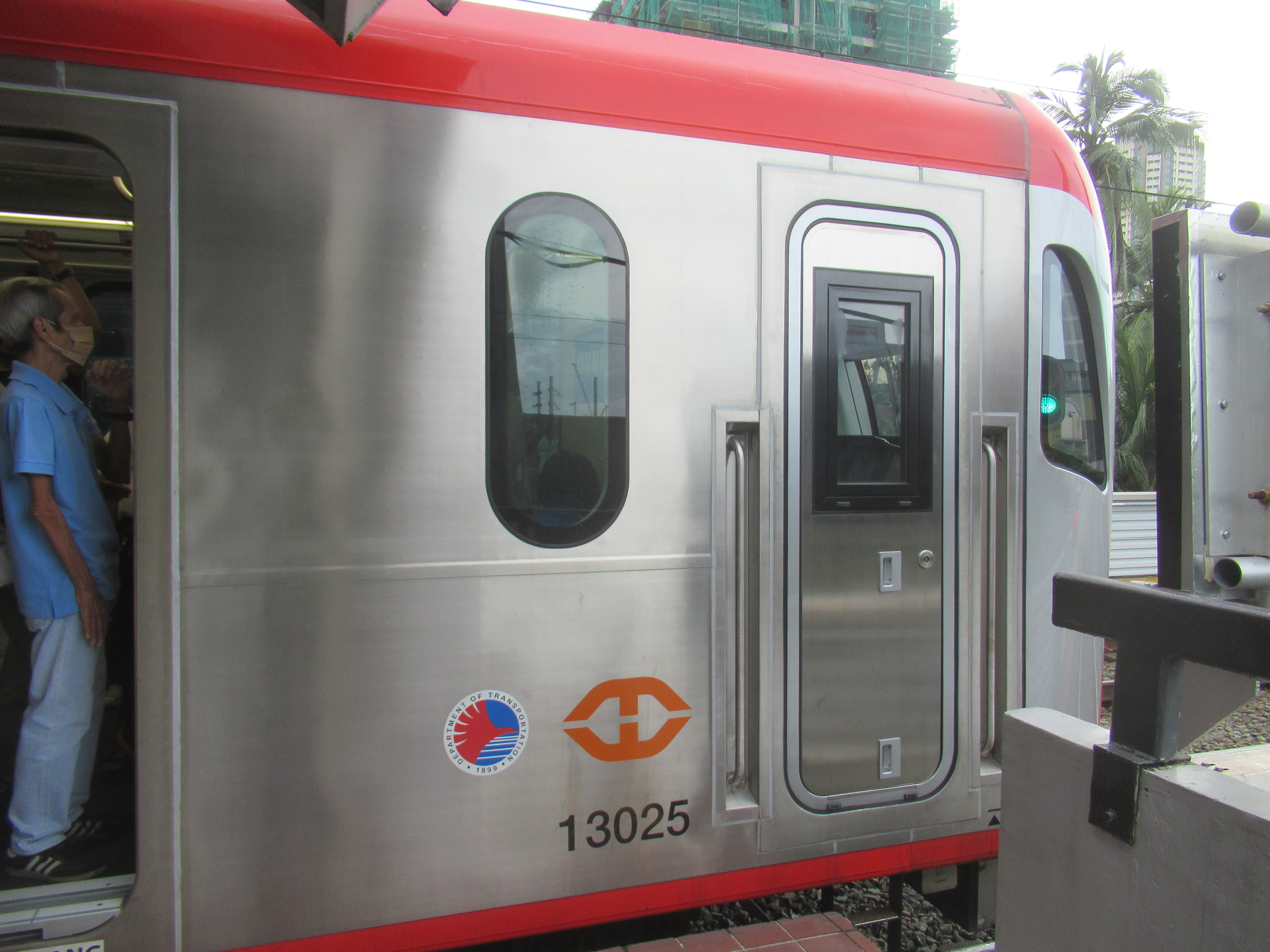
Driver's door at the front cab

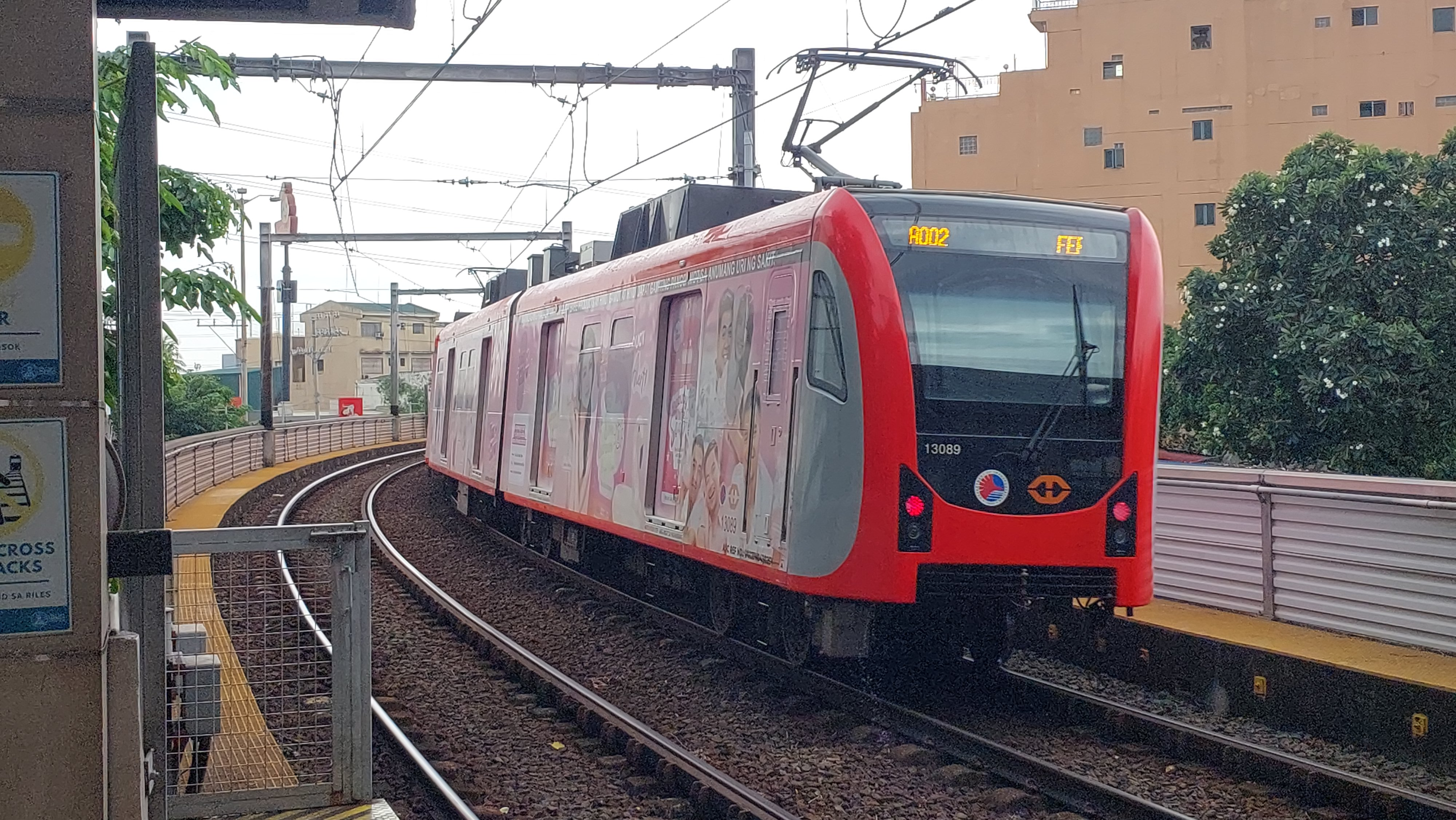
13000 class with wrap advertising

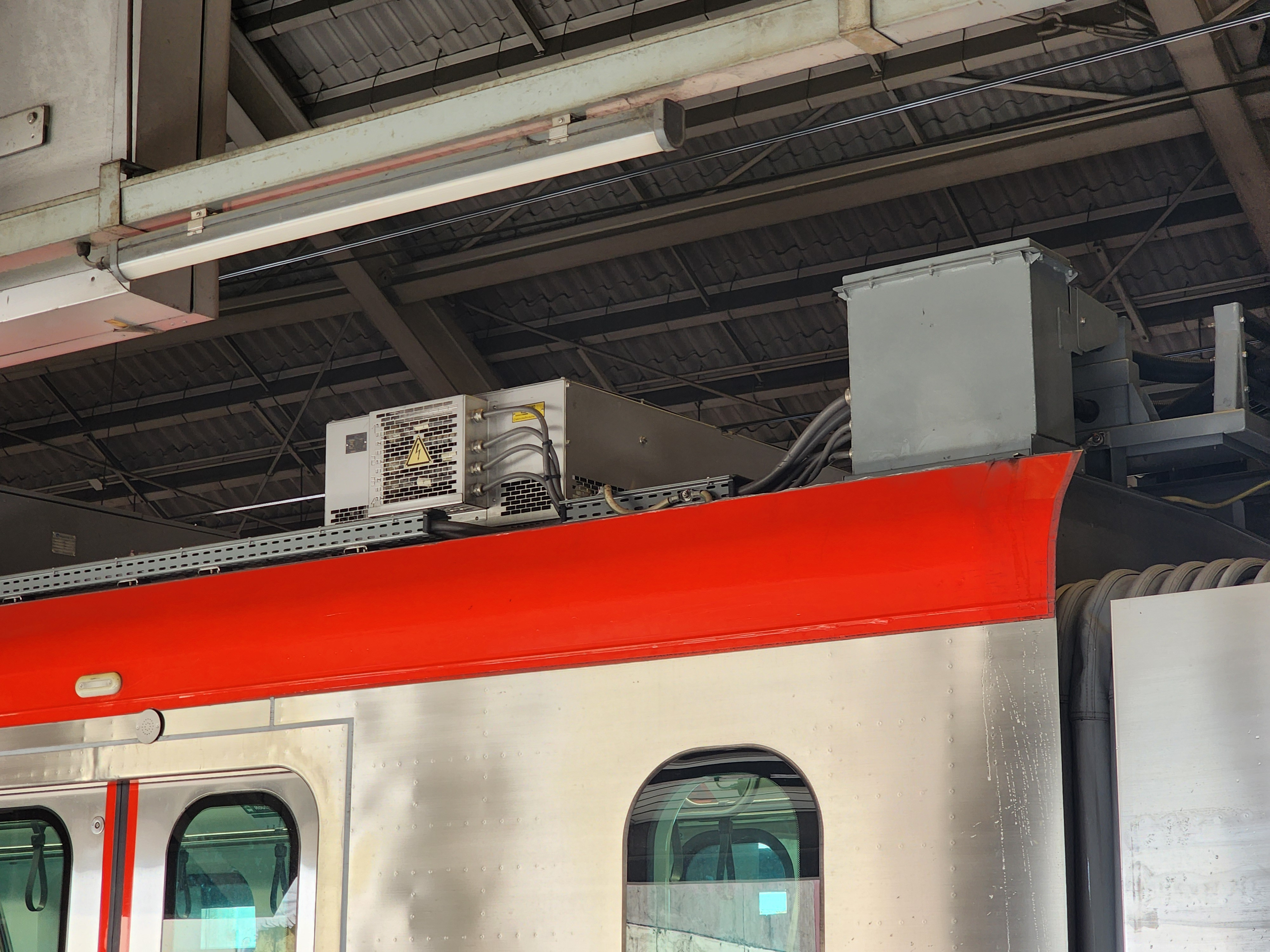
Roof-mounted resistor for regenerative braking

==== Front cab variations ====
When it was first delivered, the fourth-generation trains vary in two frame colors. The first two sets (Trainsets 1 & 2), built in Spain, have a red-painted "forehead" above the windshield and LED sign, while sets 3 to 30, built in Mexico, received a black "forehead". Both of the first two trainsets built in Spain had since removed its red forehead in April and May 2025.

Some train sets has varying signage data as well; train sets that arrived and/or were certified prior to the renaming of Roosevelt station to Fernando Poe Jr. station retained its destination signage. Later train sets feature the correct destination name which is noted to scroll instead of being static. All train sets had its signage data been updated in preparation for opening of the Cavite Extension Phase 1.

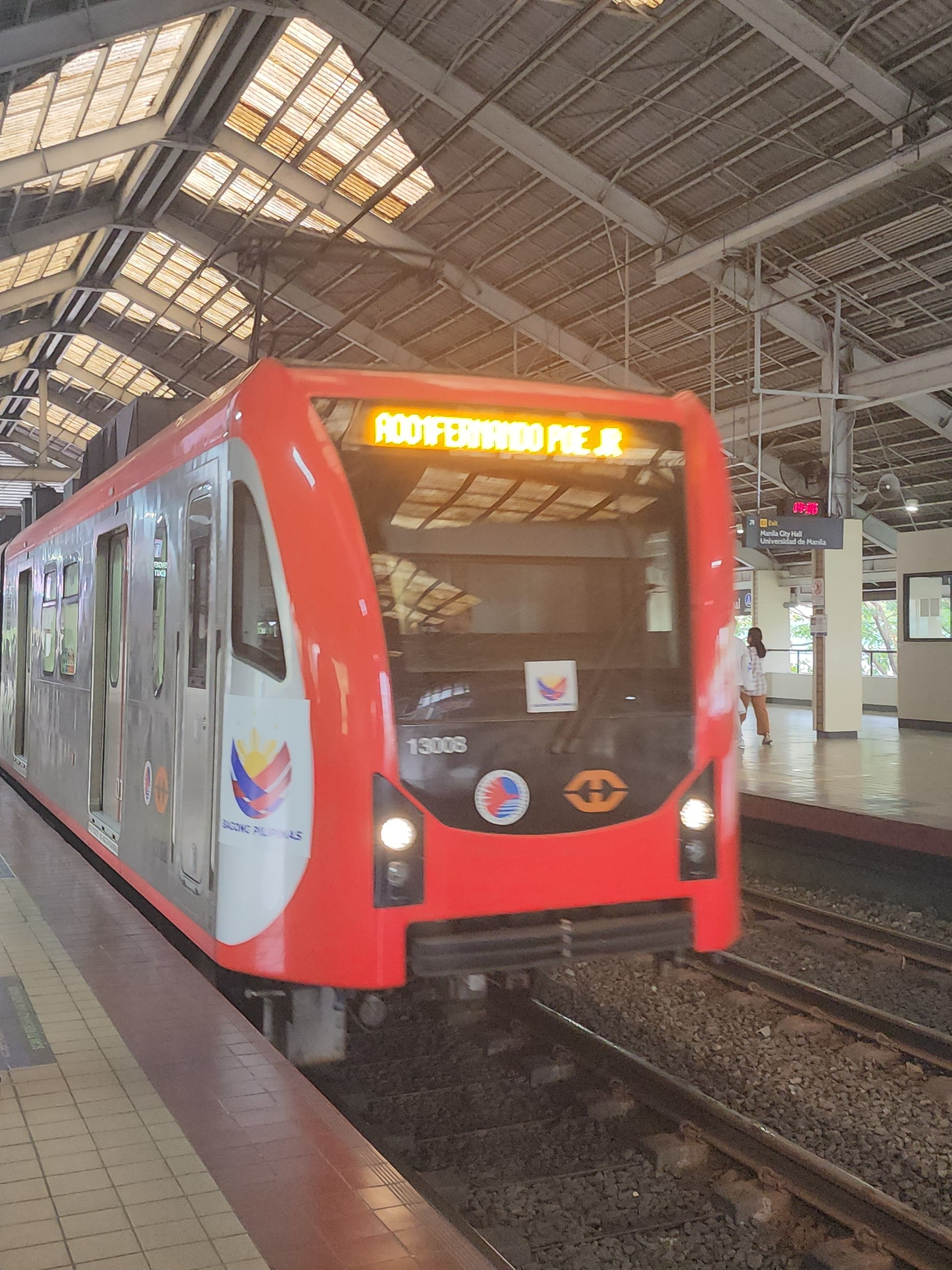
Front cab with red-painted "forehead" and the Bagong Pilipinas logo

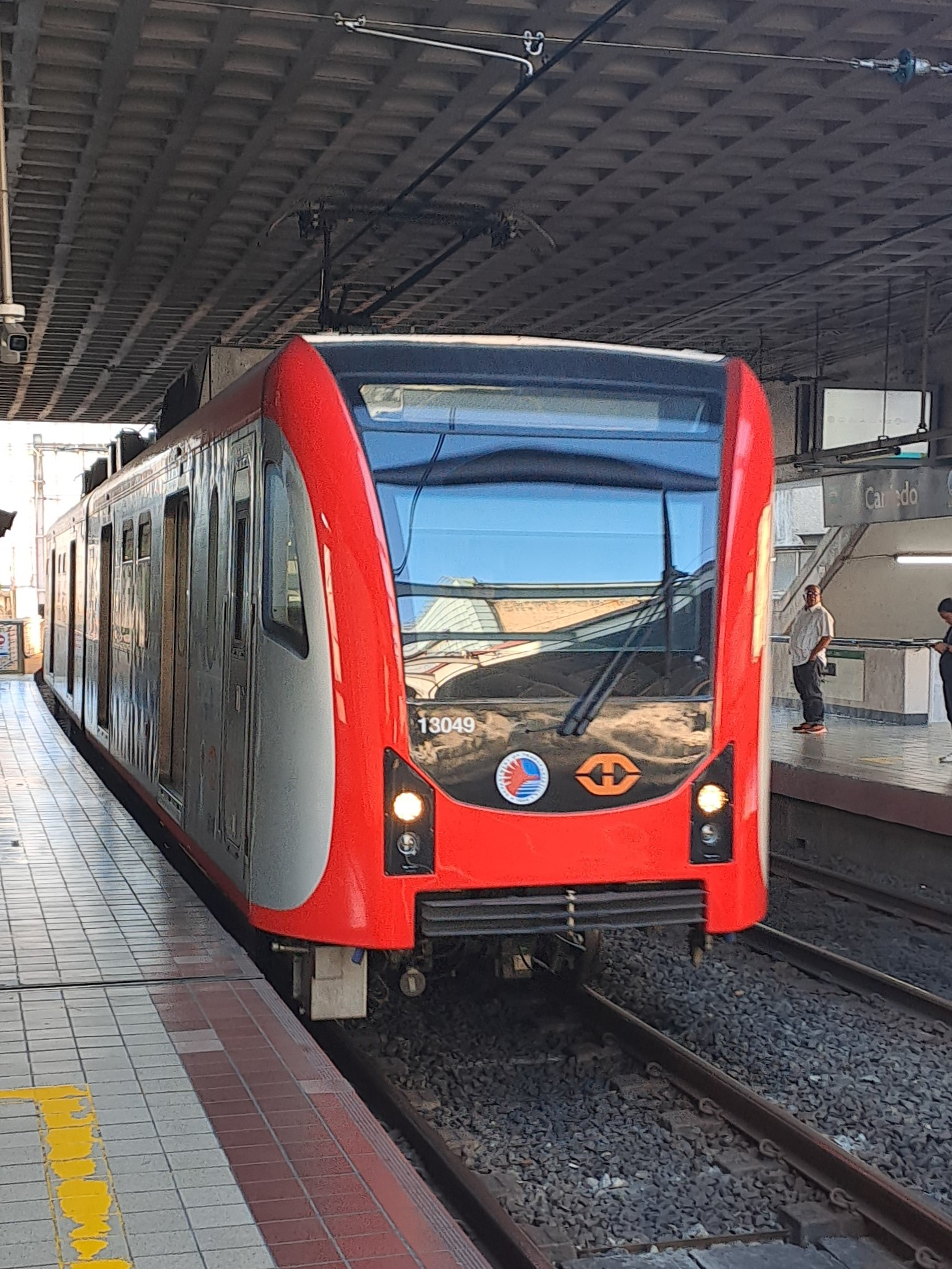
Front cab with black-painted "forehead"

=== Interior ===
As opposed to the older rolling stock, the 13000 class includes hand straps aside from safety handrails installed above the train floor.

The trains are also the first in the Philippines to feature a specially-made wheelchair-compatible space or passenger with restricted mobility (PRM) areas, located closer to the driver's cab as compared to the 1100 class and 1200 class where it is located near the articulation. Unlike the 1200 class, there are also fewer side handrails in the middle sections of each vehicle. Longitudinal seating is present in the 13000 class, as per other train classes in the system.

Like the 1100 class and 1200 class, there are four pocket-type doors per side per car. For the driving cars, one door is installed on the side of the driving cab.

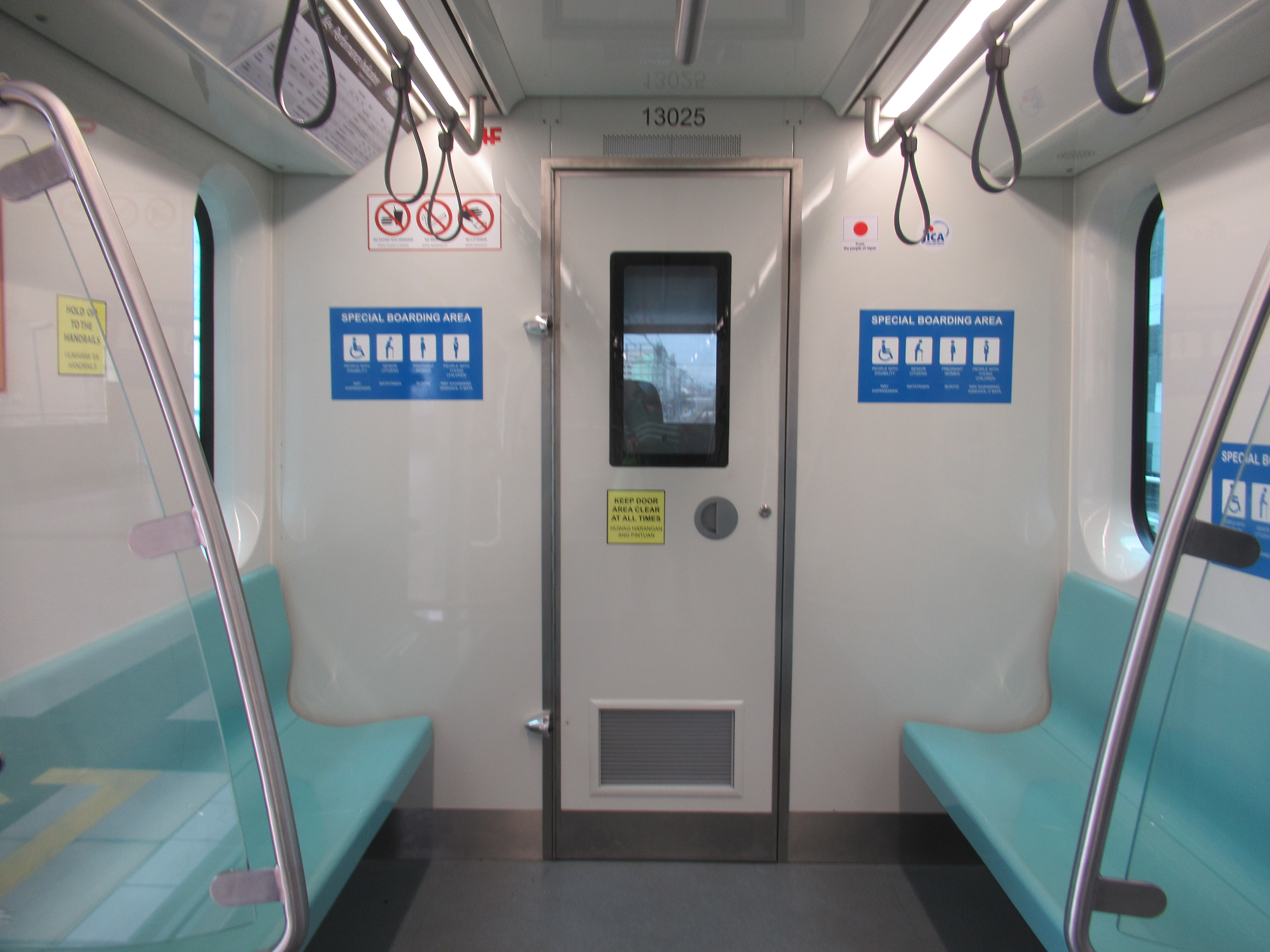
Cab-end interior

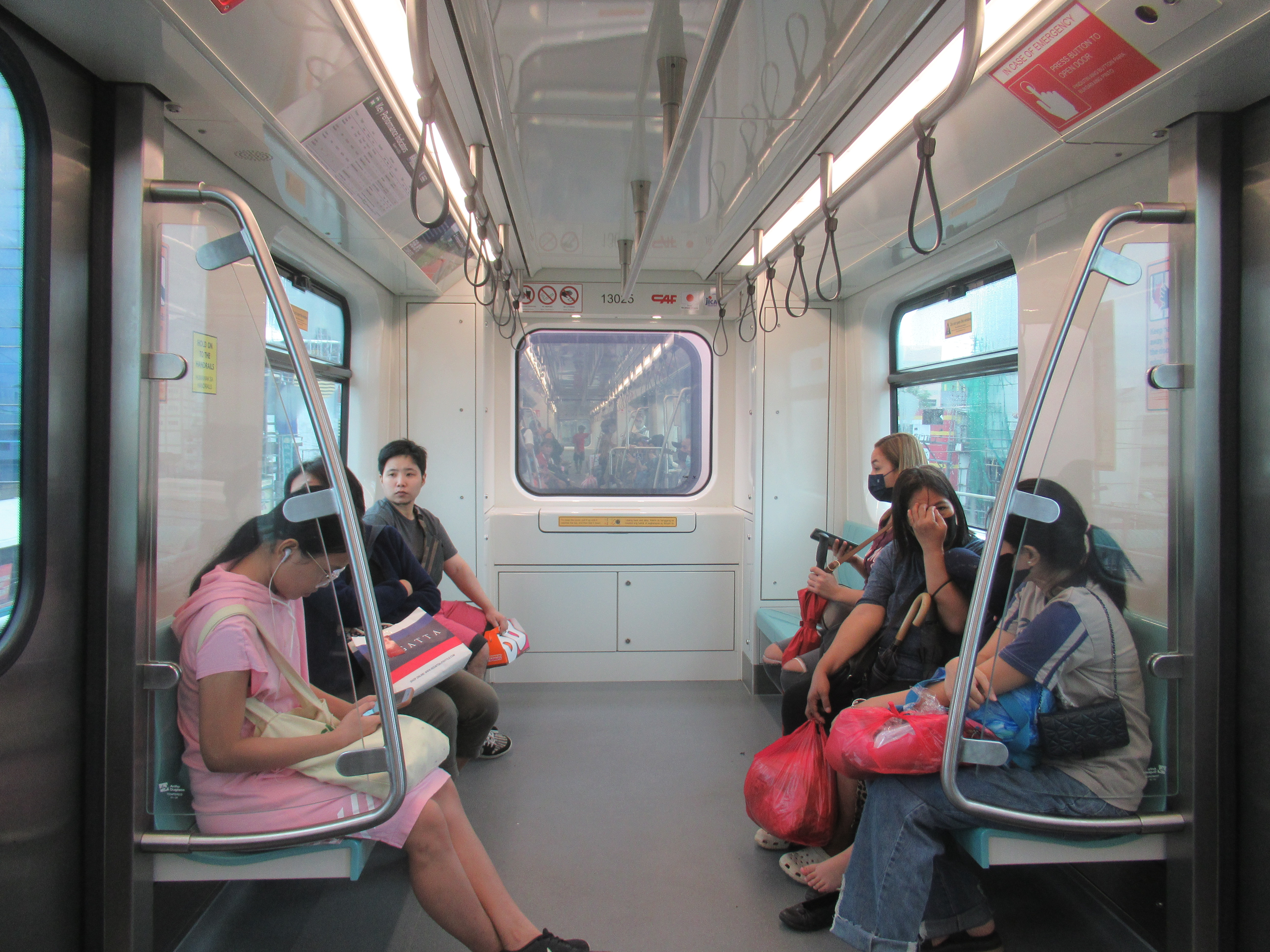
Non-cab end interior

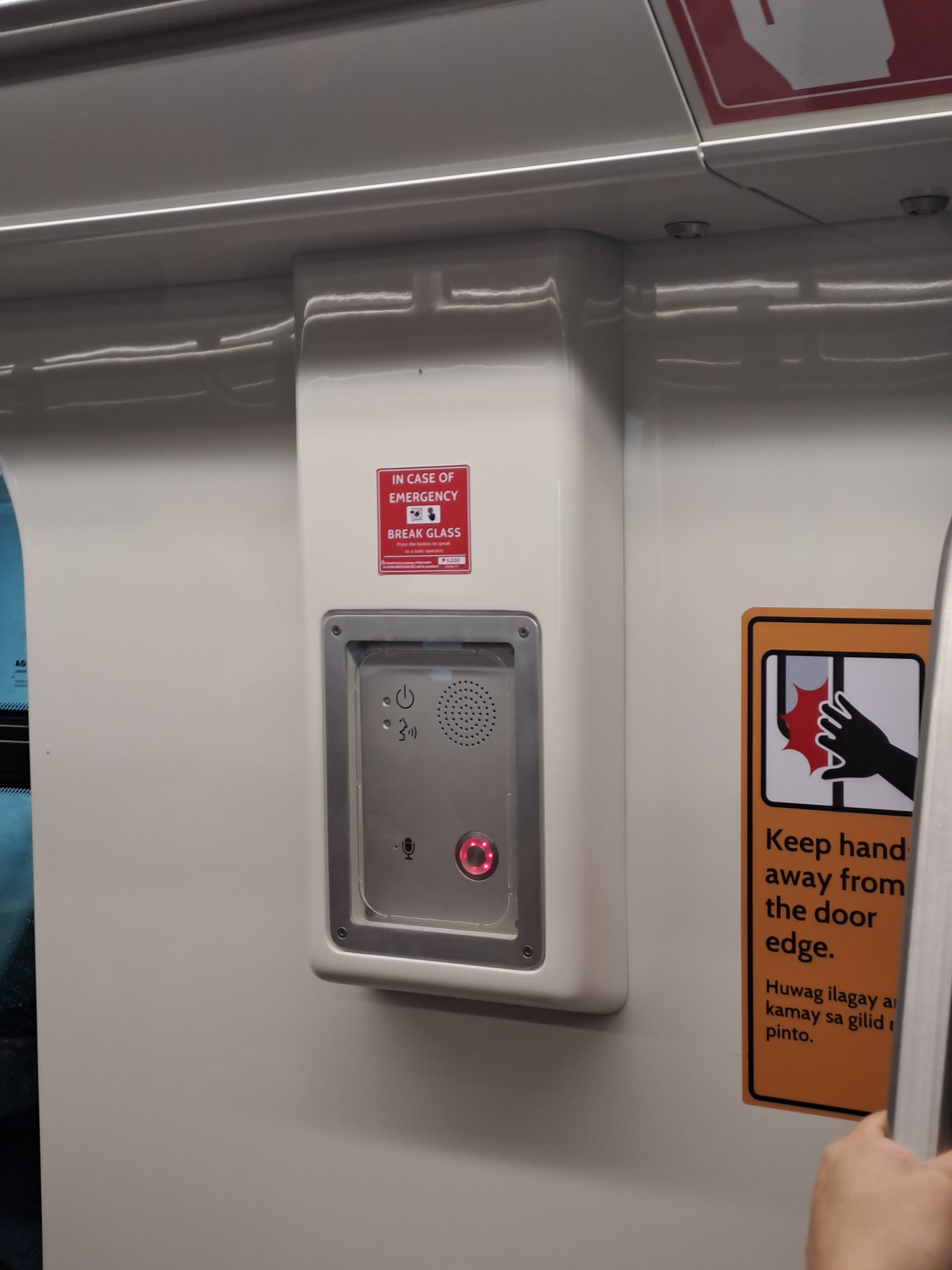
Intercom

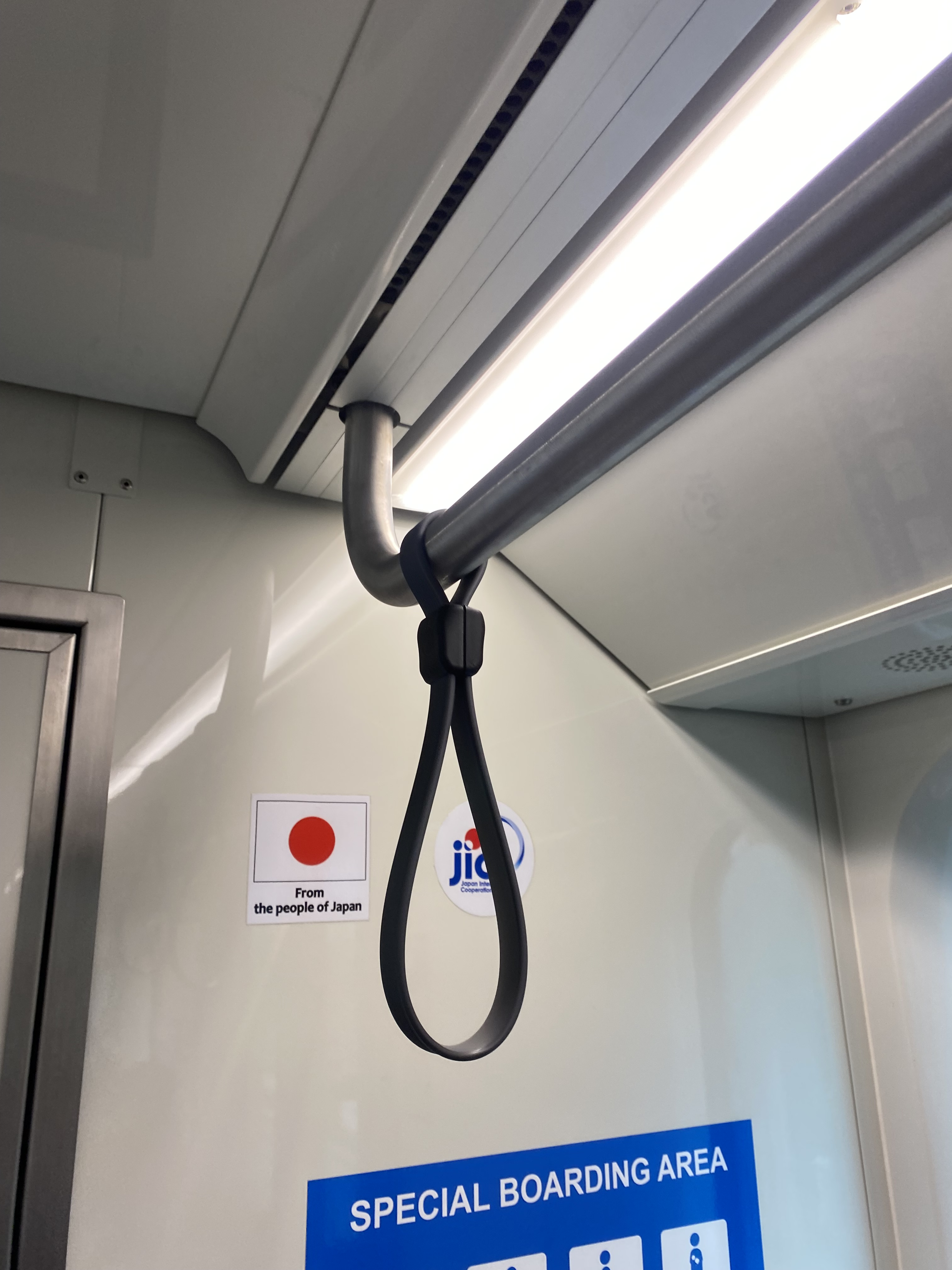
Hand straps

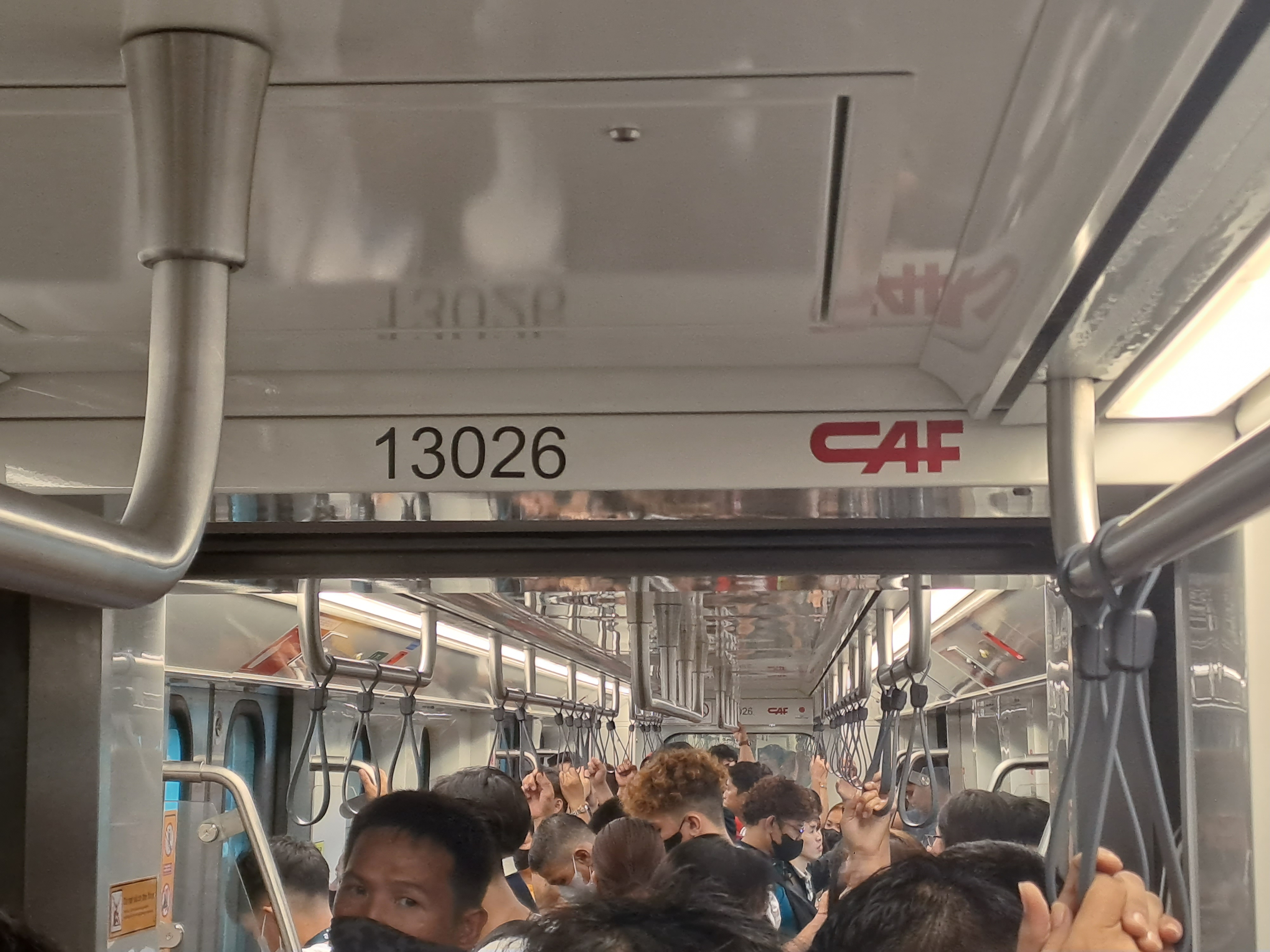
Car number and manufacturer's sticker above an open gangway

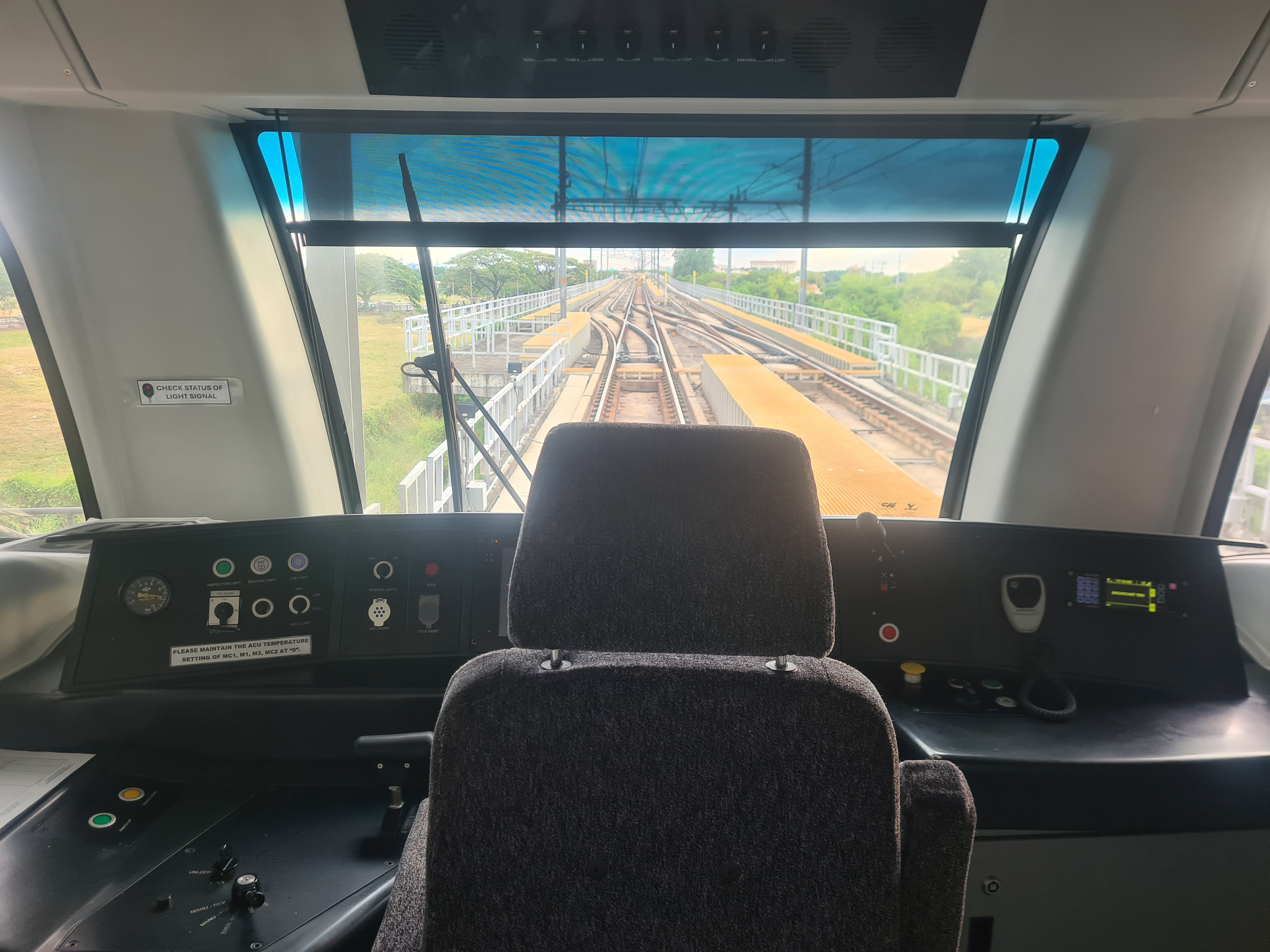
Cockpit

=== Electrical and mechanical ===
Each LRV has three inside-frame bogies consisting of two motorized bogies at the ends and a Jacobs trailer bogie under the articulation. Semi-permanent couplers are installed at the ends of every light rail vehicle, except for the driving cab section of the head car.

These trains are easily recognizable by their distinctive braking sounds, which produce a screeching noise when stopping. This trait was not present in earlier train class sets, even when they were first introduced.

Like the 1100 class and 1200 class, each LRV consists of four 105-kilowatt (141 hp) 3-phase AC induction motors, driven by variable-voltage/variable-frequency drive (VVVF) inverters with insulated-gate bipolar transistors (IGBT). Auxiliary power is sourced from a static inverter, a low-power DC voltage supply, and batteries.

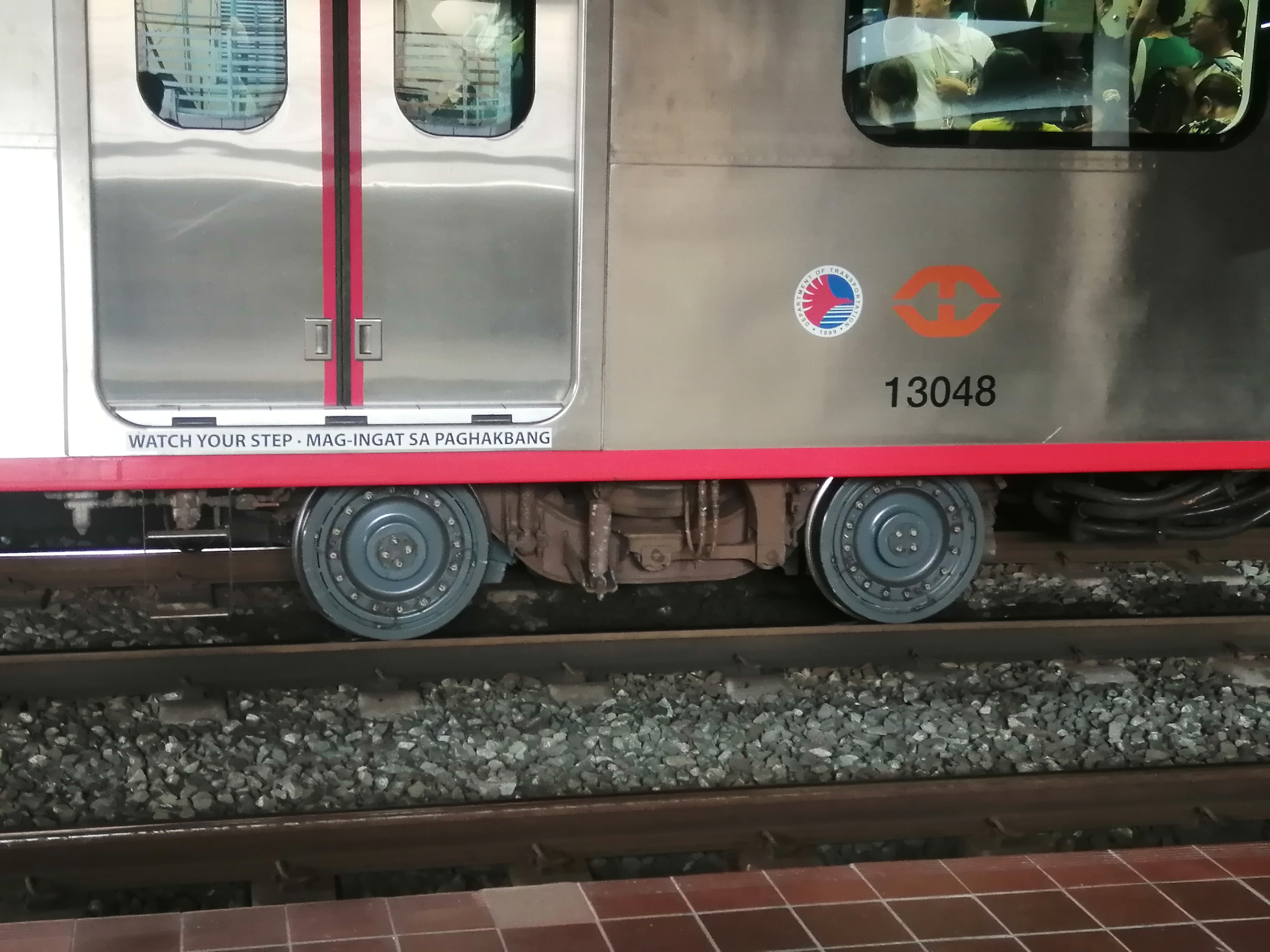
Motorized bogie of the 13000 class

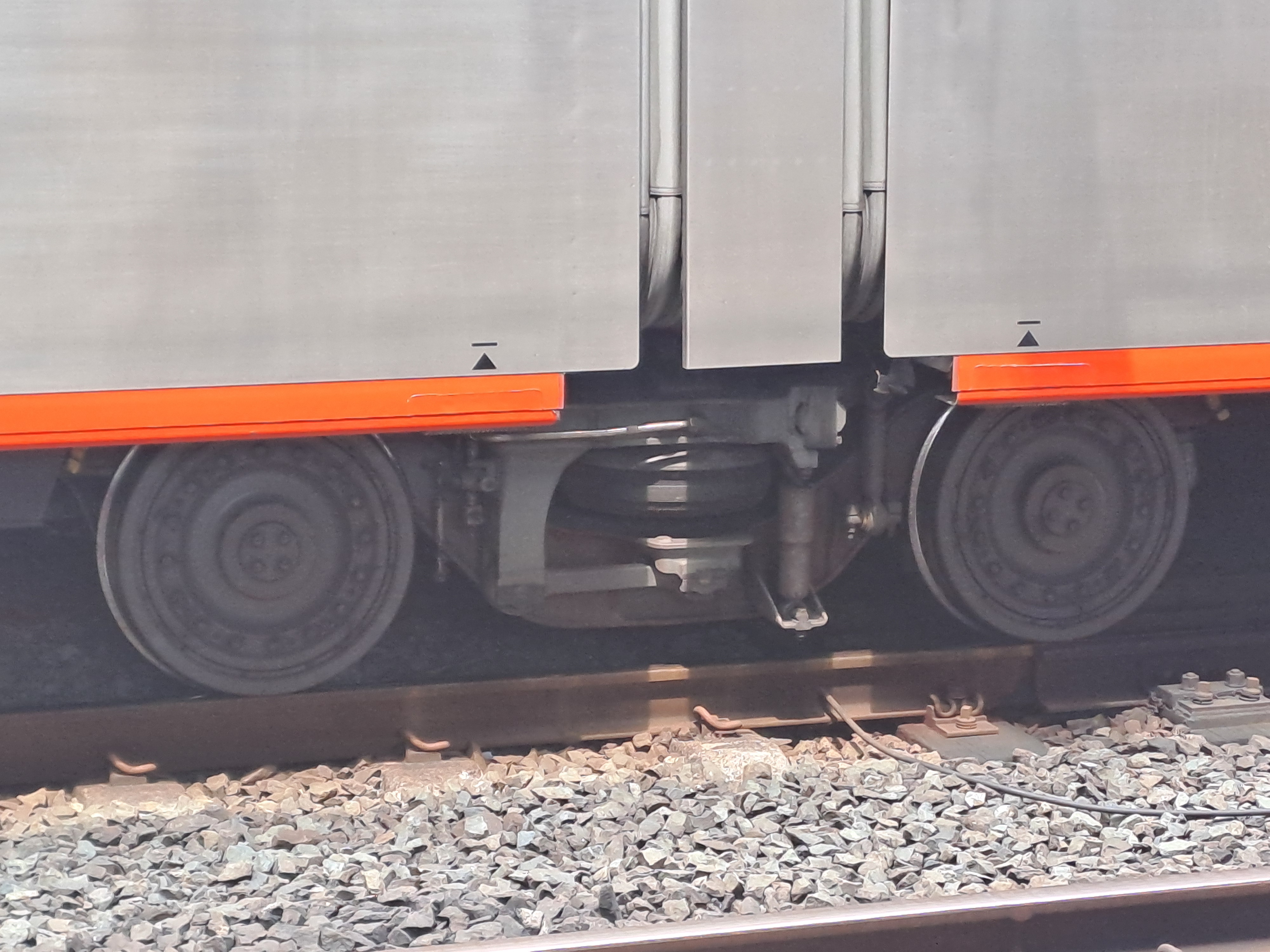
Jacobs trailer bogie

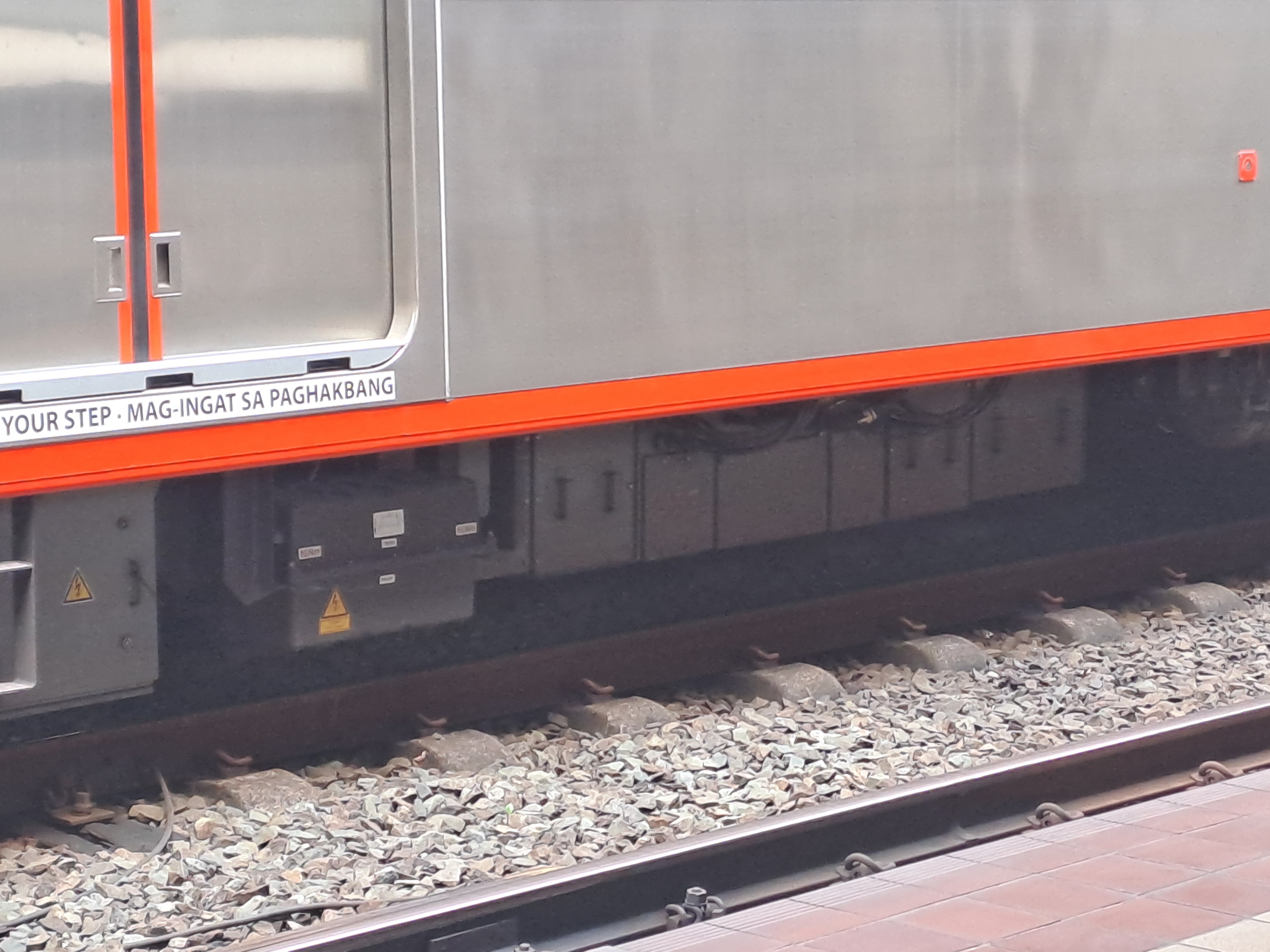
VVVF inverter

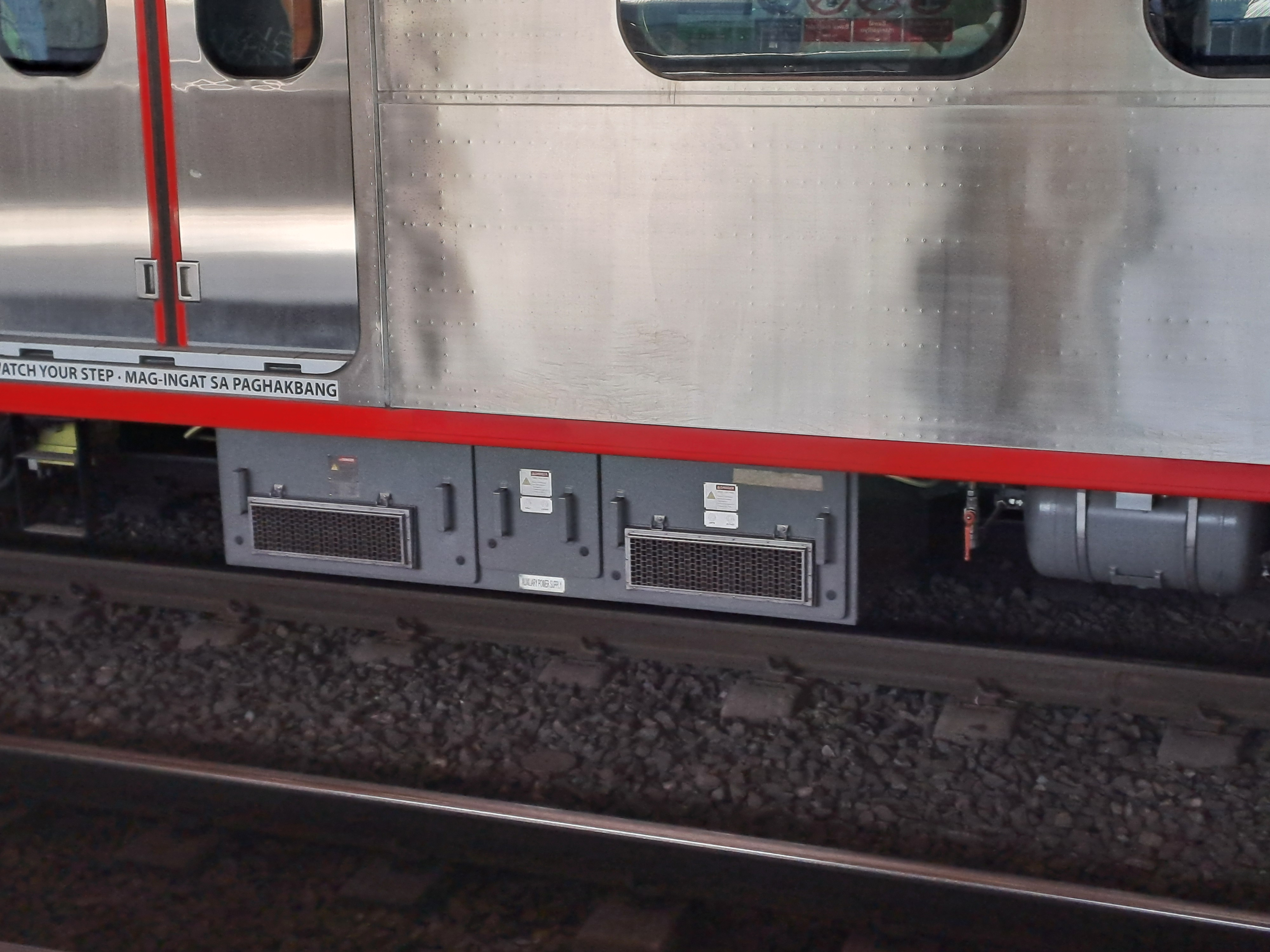
Auxiliary Power Supply

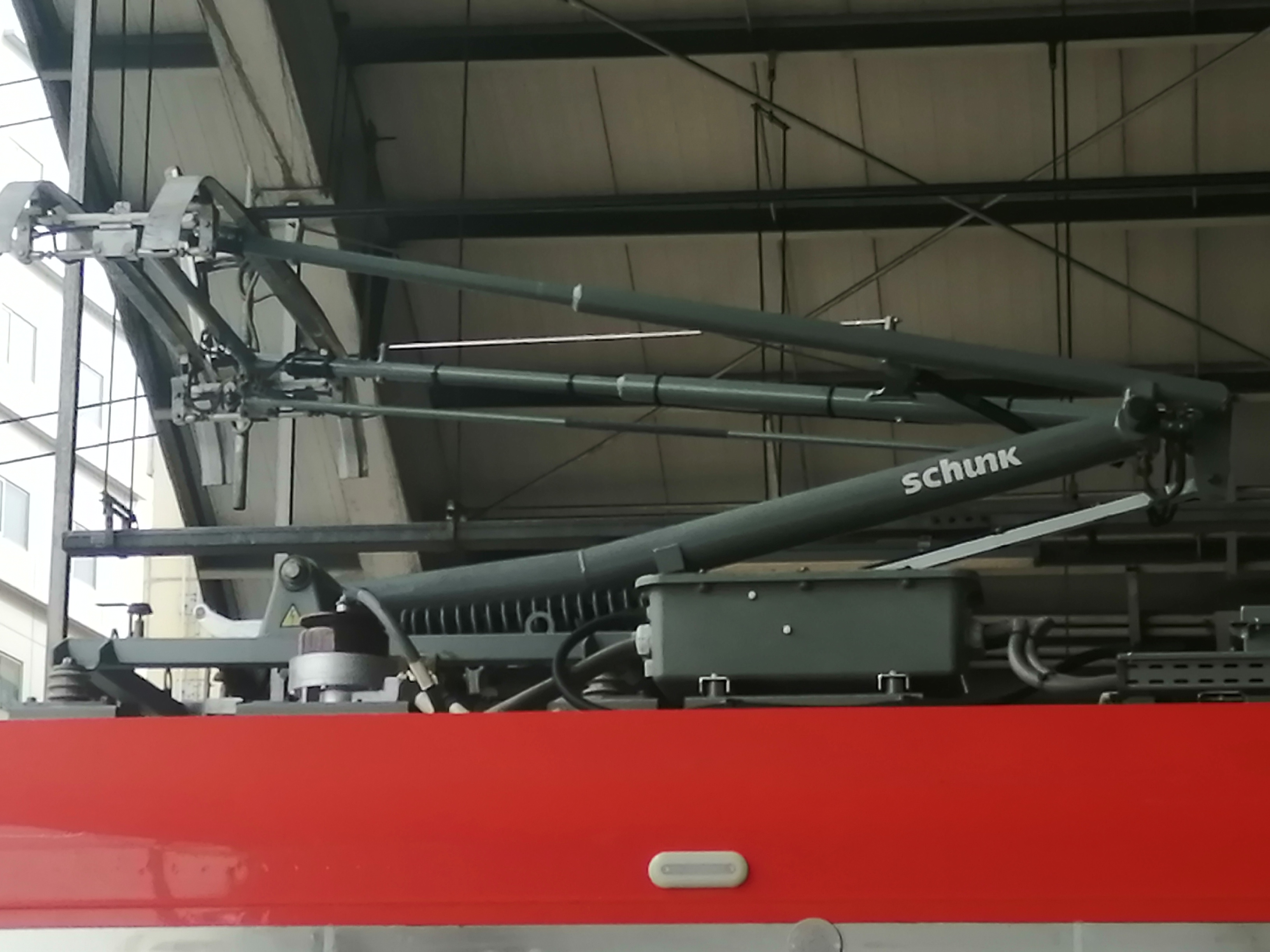
Schunk pantograph

=== Signaling and control systems ===
The trains are equipped with the automatic train protection (ATP) system. Alstom was awarded the signaling and communications contract for the south extension of the LRT Line 1 in 2016. The contractual scope included the upgrading of the mainline signaling system and the installation of the Atlas 100 on-board signaling solution for 60 train sets across the existing three generations of trains and the 13000 class trains.

The trains are also equipped with a Train Control and Monitoring System (TCMS).

== Train formation ==
The configuration of a four-car trainset is Mc–M–M–Mc. Mc denotes a driving car while M denotes an intermediate car.

Cars of 13000 class
Car type		Mc		M	
Car type		A-car	B-car	A-car	B-car
Quantity		2		2	
Control cab		Yes	No	No	No
VVVF inverter		Yes	Yes	Yes	Yes
Auxiliary inverter		Yes	Yes	Yes	Yes
Pantograph		Yes	No	Yes	No
Wheelchair spaces		Yes	No	Yes	No
Car length	m	26.5			
Car length	ft in	86 ft 11 5/16 in			
Capacity	Seated	63		69	
Capacity	Standing	275		287	
Capacity	Total	338		356	

== Fleet list ==
Set No.	1	2	3	4
1	13001	13002	13003	13004
2	13005	13006	13007	13008
3	13009	13010	13011	13012
4	13013	13014	13015	13016
5	13017	13018	13019	13020
6	13021	13022	13023	13024
7	13025	13026	13027	13028
8	13029	13030	13031	13032
9	13033	13034	13035	13036
10	13037	13038	13039	13040
11	13041	13042	13043	13044
12	13045	13046	13047	13048
13	13049	13050	13051	13052
14	13053	13054	13055	13056
15	13057	13058	13059	13060
16	13061	13062	13063	13064
17	13065	13066	13067	13068
18	13069	13070	13071	13072
19	13073	13074	13075	13076
20	13077	13078	13079	13080
21	13081	13082	13083	13084
22	13085	13086	13087	13088
23	13089	13090	13091	13092
24	13093	13094	13095	13096
25	13097	13098	13099	13100
26	13101	13102	13103	13104
27	13105	13106	13107	13108
28	13109	13110	13111	13112
29	13113	13114	13115	13116
30	13117	13118	13119	13120

== Incidents ==
On June 18, 2025, 13051 (Set 13) emitted smoke at the section between Redemptorist–Aseana station and Baclaran station due to a catenary fault. As a result, LRMC implemented a provisionary service on LRT Line 1 from Gil Puyat station to Fernando Poe Jr. station and vice versa at 8:54am, with full line operations later resumed at 5:38pm.

== Sources ==
- Department of Transportation and Communications; Light Rail Transit Authority (October 16, 2015). "BIDDING DOCUMENTS - Part 2 for Procurement of New Rolling Stock LRV (4th Generation)" (PDF). LRT 1-South (Cavite) Extension Project. Archived from the original (PDF) on December 16, 2021.
- "Gearboxes" (PDF). CAF MiiRA. December 2023.
- Light Rail Transit Authority (March 2022). Year-End Accomplishment Report (CY 2021) (PDF) (Report).
- Japan International Cooperation Agency; Oriental Consultants Co., Ltd.; ALMEC Corporation; Katahira & Engineers International; Tonichi Engineering Consultants, Inc. (July 2013). Study on railway strategy for enhancement of railway network system in Metro Manila of the Republic of the Philippines: Final report, Vol.1-LRT Line 1: Cavite extension project (2013) (PDF) (Report). Archived (PDF) from the original on December 27, 2021.
