= LRTA 1000 class =

Oldest rolling stock operating at LRT-1

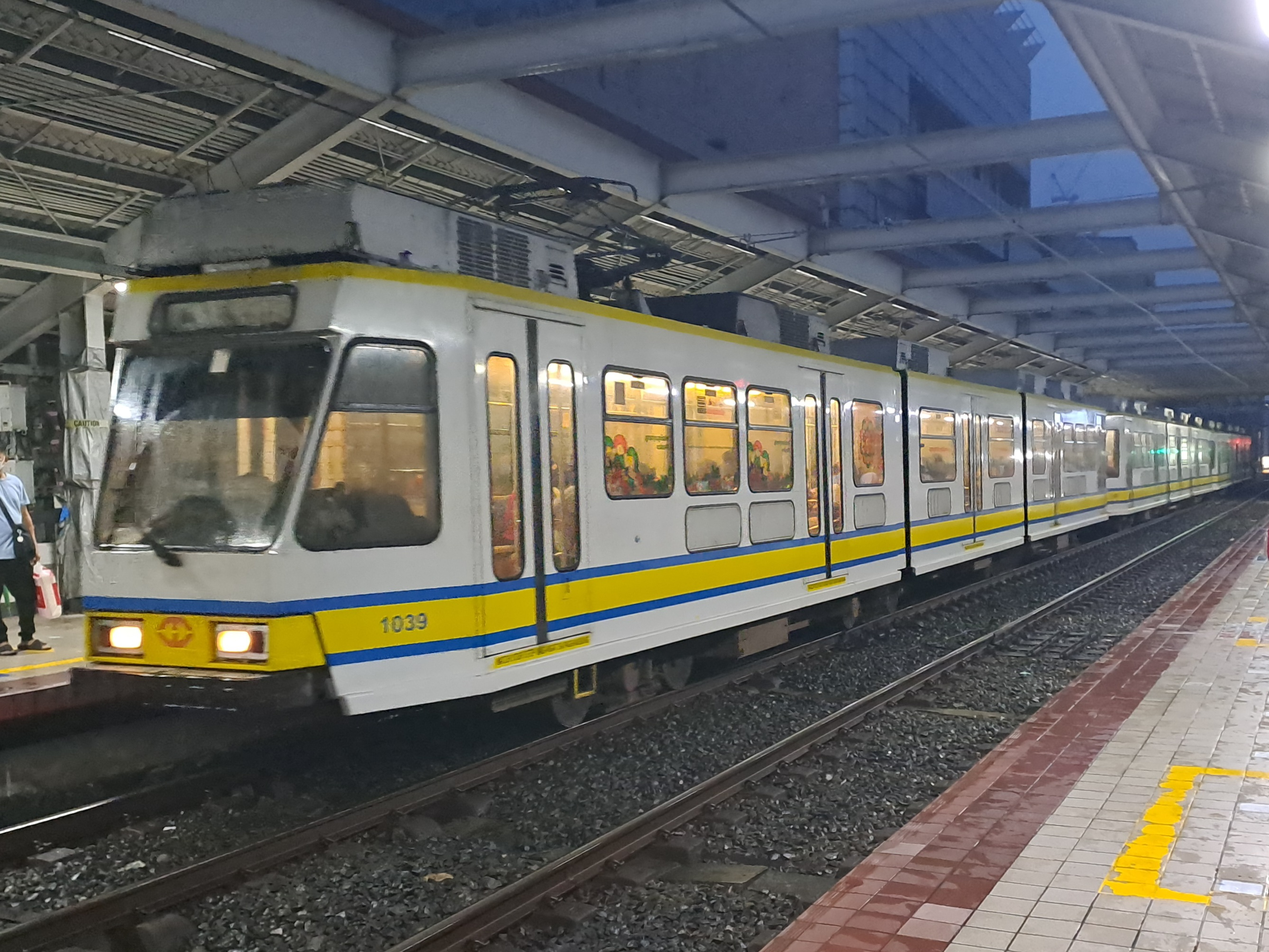
- 1000 class LRV at Carriedo in June 2023

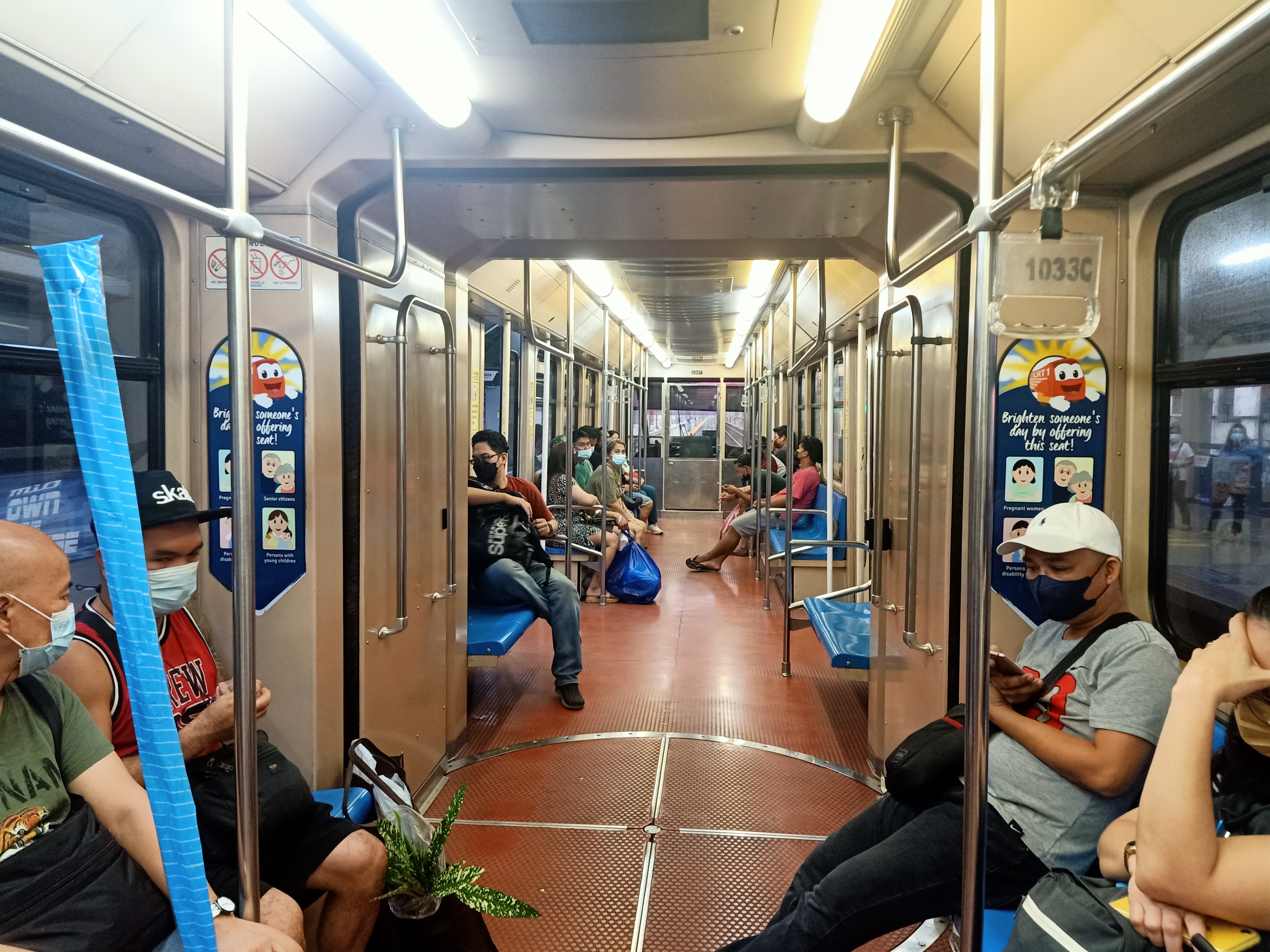
- Train interior in March 2022
- Stock type: Light rail vehicle
- In service: 1984–2025
- Manufacturers: BN and ACEC
- Assembly: Bruges, Belgium
- Constructed: 1982–1983
- Entered service: December 1, 1984; 41 years ago
- Refurbished: 1999–2001, 2003–2008; 2016–2022
- Scrapped: 2000–
- Number built: 64 vehicles (32 sets, initially 2-car sets)
- Number in service: None
- Number scrapped: 8 vehicles
- Successor: 13000 class
- Formation: 2/3 cars per trainset
- Fleet numbers: 1001–1064
- Capacity: 374 per car 748–1,122 per train
- Operators: METRO, Inc. (1984–2000); LRTA (2000–2015); LRMC (2015–present)
- Depot: Baclaran
- Line served: Line 1

Specifications
- Car body construction: BI sheet/copper-clad steel
- Train length: 59.58 m (195 ft 5 43/64 in) (2 cars); 89.37 m (293 ft 2 1/2 in) (3 cars)
- Car length: 29.79 m (97 ft 8 53/64 in)
- Width: 2.5 m (8 ft 2 27/64 in)
- Height: 3,272 mm (10 ft 8 13/16 in) (as built); 3,525 mm (11 ft 6 25/32 in) (refurbished)
- Floor height: 0.9 m (2 ft 11 7/16 in)
- Platform height: 0.69 m (2 ft 3 11/64 in)
- Doors: Double-leaf plug-type; 5 per side; 51 in (1.3 m) wide
- Articulated sections: 3
- Wheel diameter: 660 mm (25 63/64 in) (new)
- Wheelbase: 1.9 m (6 ft 3 in) (motor bogies); 1.8 m (5 ft 11 in) (trailer bogies)
- Maximum speed: 70 km/h (43 mph)
- Weight: 41 t (90,000 lb) (as built); 46 t (101,000 lb) (refurbished)
- Axle load: 9 t (20,000 lb)
- Traction system: ACEC thyristor chopper
- Traction motors: 2 × 217.7 kW (291.9 hp) DC series-wound
- Power output: 435.4 kW (583.9 hp) per LRV; 870.8 kW (1,167.8 hp) (2 cars); 1.31 MW (1,760 hp) (3 cars)
- Transmission: Right-angle link drive
- Acceleration: 1.0 m/s^{2} (3.28 ft/s^{2})
- Deceleration: 1.3 m/s^{2} (4.27 ft/s^{2}) (service); 2.08 m/s^{2} (6.82 ft/s^{2}) (emergency)
- Auxiliaries: Static converter
- HVAC: Forced ventilation (1984–2008); Roof-mounted duct-type air conditioning (2004–present)
- Electric systems: 750 V DC overhead catenary
- Current collection: Schunk single-arm pantograph
- UIC classification: Bo′+2′+2′+Bo′
- Bogies: Inside-frame type
- Minimum turning radius: 25 m (82 ft 0 in)
- Braking systems: WABCO electro-pneumatic, regenerative, and rheostatic Bogie-mounted disc and track brakes
- Safety systems: ACEC fixed block relay-type ATS (1984–2007); Siemens fixed block ATP/ATS (2007–2022); Alstom Atlas 100 ETCS-1 with subsystem of ATP (2022–present)
- Coupling system: Semi-permanent
- Seating: Longitudinal
- Track gauge: 1,435 mm (4 ft 8 1/2 in) standard gauge

Notes/references
- Sourced from unless otherwise noted.

The LRTA 1000 class is the first-generation class of high-floor light rail vehicles (LRV) of the Manila LRT Line 1. Purchased under soft loans from the Belgian Government, the trains first entered service under the Light Rail Transit Authority (LRTA) in 1984.

It has undergone two refurbishments; the first from 1999 to 2008, and the most recent by the Light Rail Manila Corporation (LRMC) from 2016 to 2017. The newer 13000 class trains have gradually replaced the older 1000 class trains since July 2023.

== Operational history ==
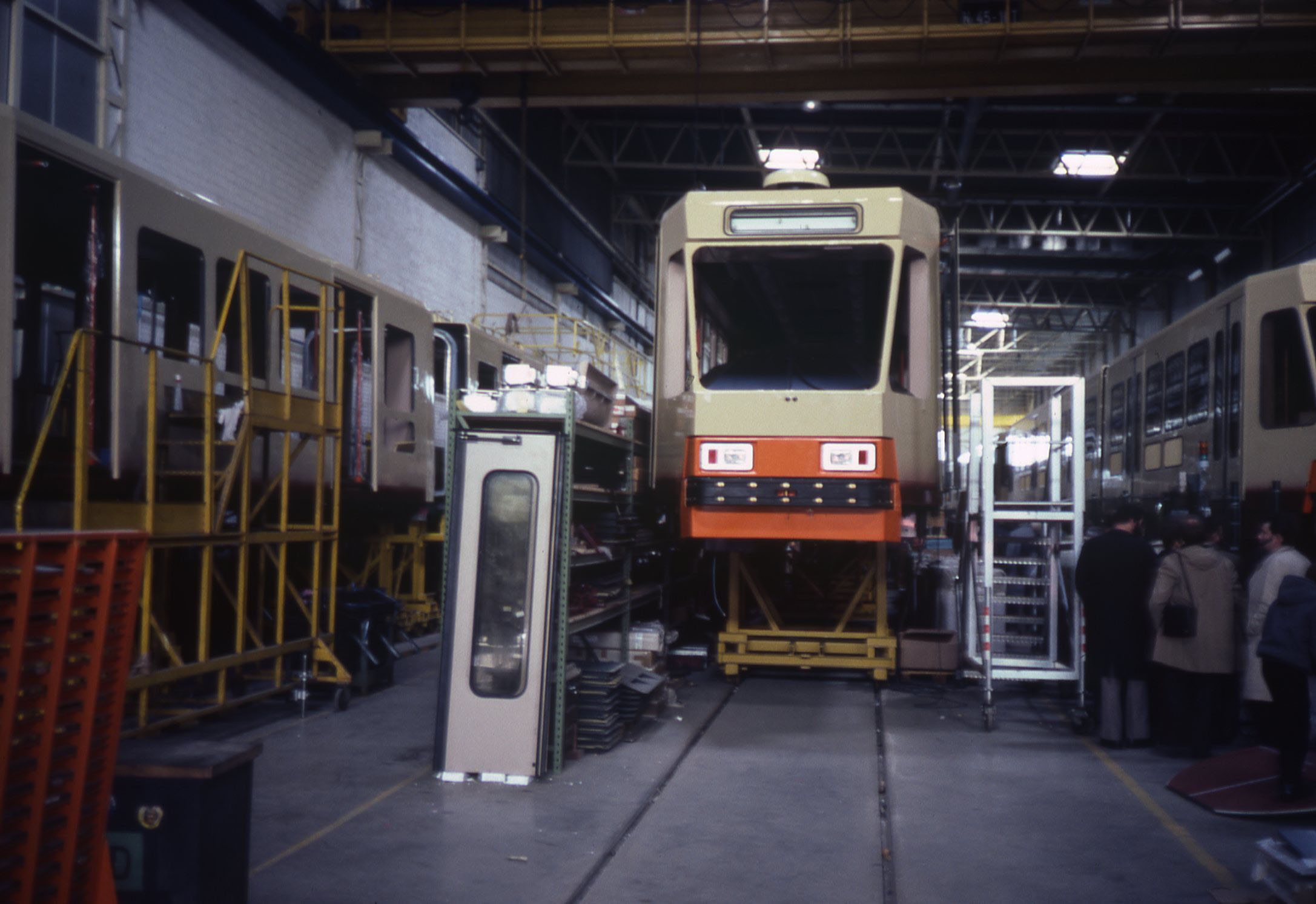
LRT 1000 class LRVs under construction in the BN plant in Bruges, Belgium

=== Purchase ===
The construction of the original 15-kilometer (9.3 mi) section of the LRT Line 1 was funded by a ₱300 million soft and interest-free loan from the Belgian Government. Additional funding for the project was later sourced from a ₱700 million loan provided by the consortium of ACEC (Ateliers de Constructions Electriques de Charleroi), BN (Constructions Ferroviaires et Metalliques, formerly Brugeoise et Nivelles), TEI (Tractionnel Engineering International), and TC (Transurb Consult). The trains were included in the second loan package, along with the power systems, signaling, and telecommunications.

=== Production and initial operations ===
The trains were manufactured by BN (later Bombardier Transportation Belgium S.A.; now Alstom), while the electrical equipment supplied were from ACEC. A total of 64 trains were built between 1982 and 1983.

In its early stages, these trains ran on a two-car configuration until 1999, when it was upgraded to three cars. However, not all of the train cars are capable to be coupled to form three-car sets.

=== First refurbishment ===
From 1999 to 2001, 32 LRVs underwent the first refurbishment, carried out by BN (Bombardier Transportation Belgium S.A.), ACEC Transport SA, Transurb Consult, and Tractebel. The car body was repaired, and a new livery design was added. Seats were also replaced, new components were installed, and modifications were made on the roof for the installation of air conditioning units. Replacement and cleaning of electrical components were not included.

The 31 remaining LRVs that were not modernized in Phase 1 underwent refurbishment by the Light Rail Transit Authority from 2004 to January 2008. This involved the replacement of the electrical components of the trains, along with additional works in the 32 refurbished LRVs.

=== Second refurbishment ===
In September 2012, the then-Department of Transportation and Communications (DOTC) and the Light Rail Transit Authority (LRTA) announced a ₱203 million rehabilitation program for twenty-one first-generation vehicles.

After the Light Rail Manila Corporation (LRMC) took over the operations and maintenance of Line 1 in 2015, the company initiated the second refurbishment of the trains in 2016 worth ₱1 billion. LRMC contracted Joratech Corporation to rehabilitate forty-six LRVs. These underwent removal of rust from the car body, repainting, replacement of flooring, and installation of new LED lightings and onboard signaling systems.

As of April 2022, 46 light rail vehicles underwent the second refurbishment.

=== Themed trains ===
By 2016, LRMC began placing special themed decorations in the 1000 class trains. These include the yearly Christmas and Valentine's-themed trains, special COVID-19 pandemic and vaccination-themed decorations, and a Gabay Guro themed train for teachers.

=== Retirement ===
The first-generation 1000 class trains have been gradually replaced with the newer 13000 class fourth-generation trains. with some trains been relocated in order to accommodate the new trains.

== Design ==
The LRV design is an 8-axle rigid body consisting of three articulated cars. It is the only 8-axle light rail vehicle in the entire rolling stock of the LRT Line 1, as subsequent trains since 1999 were built to the 6-axle design.

=== Car body ===
The 1000 class trains are made of BI sheet, sporting a white body livery with blue and yellow cheatlines. Prior to the first refurbishment, the 1000 class wore an orange and cream-white livery under the "Metrorail" branding, and notably had "mushroom-cap" roof-mounted ventilation.

Prior to the 2003 refurbishment, each light rail vehicle had 12 roof-mounted forced ventilation units. A refurbished light rail vehicle has five roof-mounted air-conditioning units.

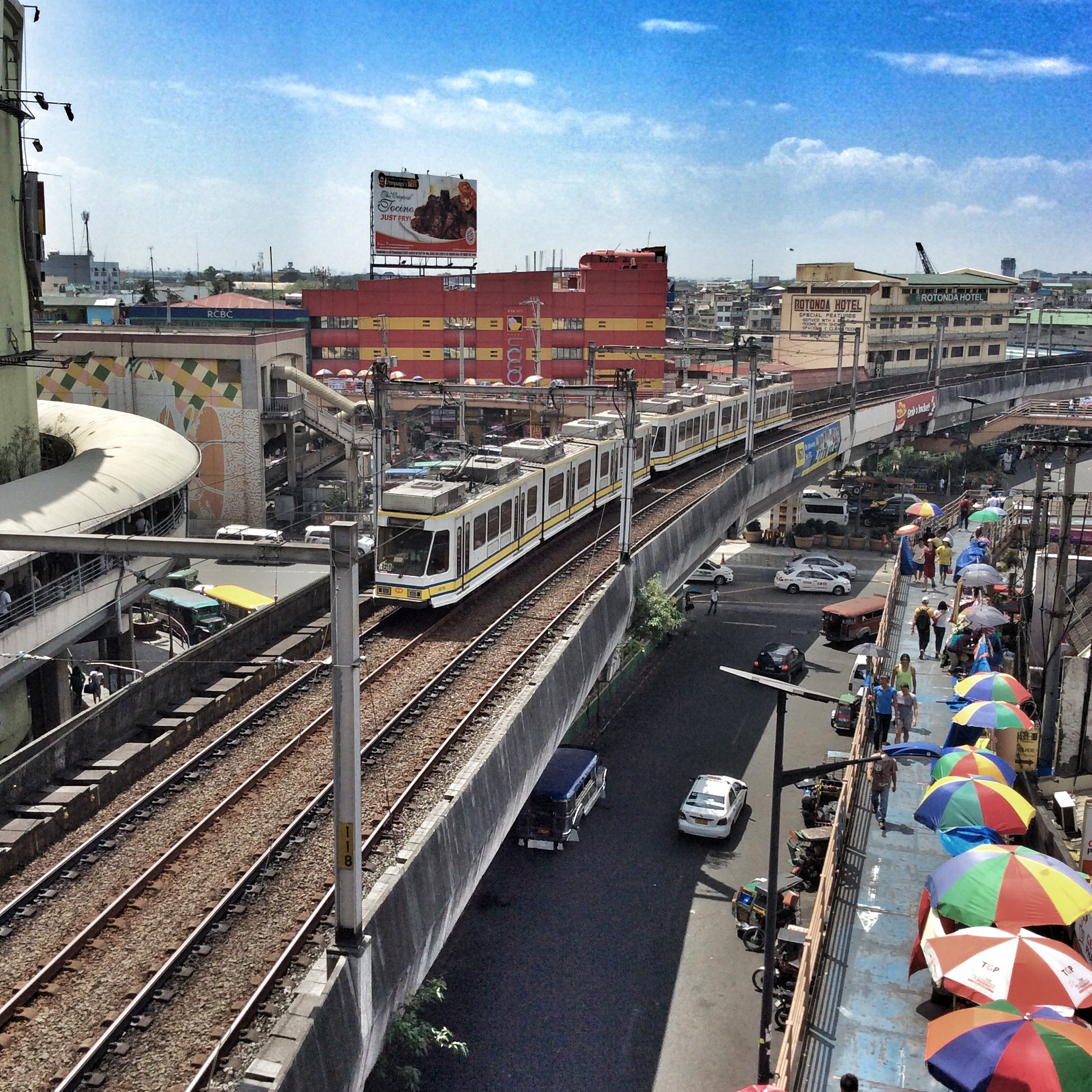
A two-car 1000 class train approaching EDSA station

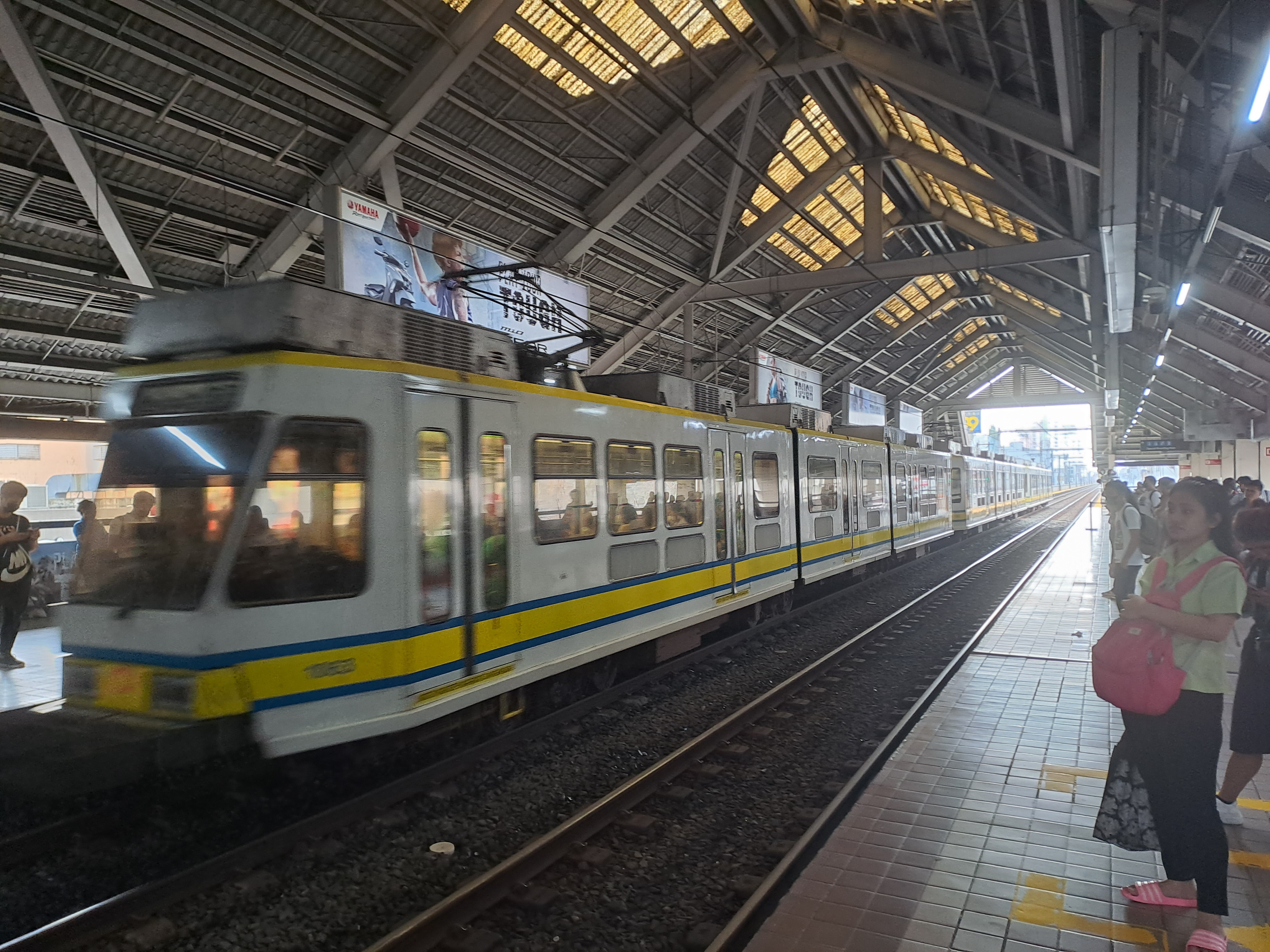
A three-car 1000 class train at Monumento station

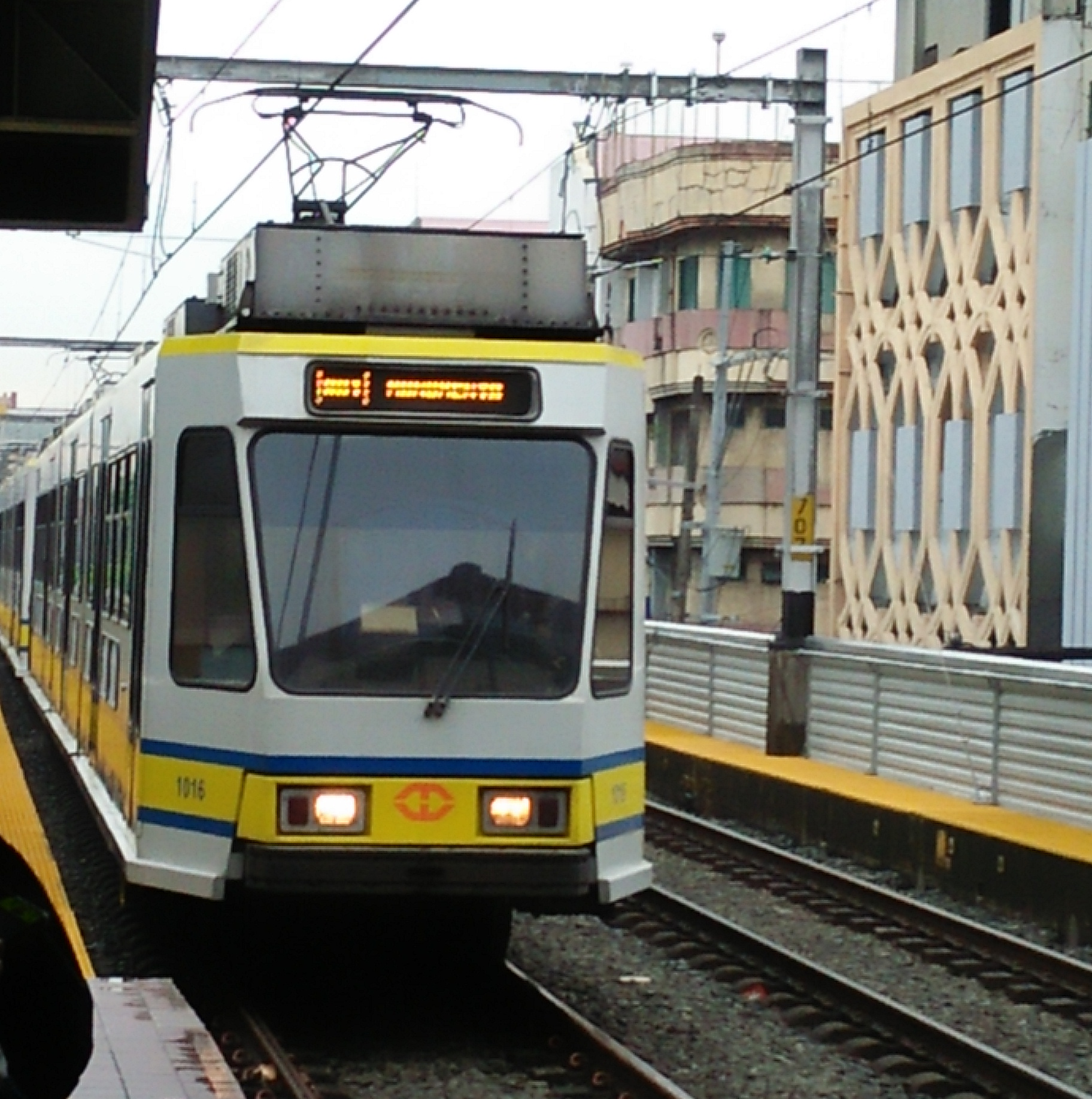
A newly refurbished 1000 class LRV with an LED destination front display

=== Interior ===
Each LRV has five door swing plug-type doors per side. Each train car has a capacity of 81 seated passengers and 293 standing passengers, carrying a total of 374 passengers. Seats are colored blue and are longitudinal-type.

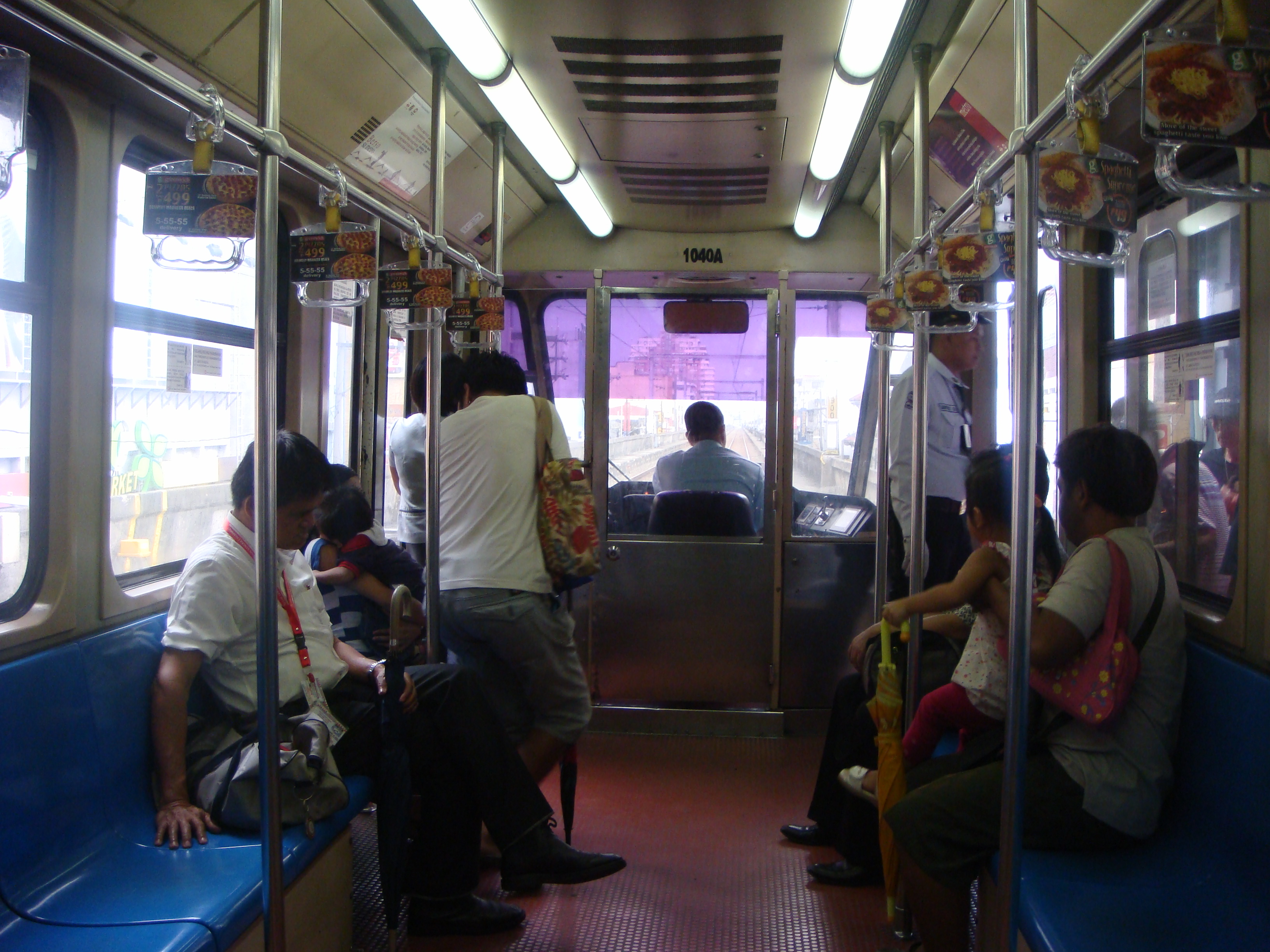
Interior of 1000 class LRV (first refurbishment)

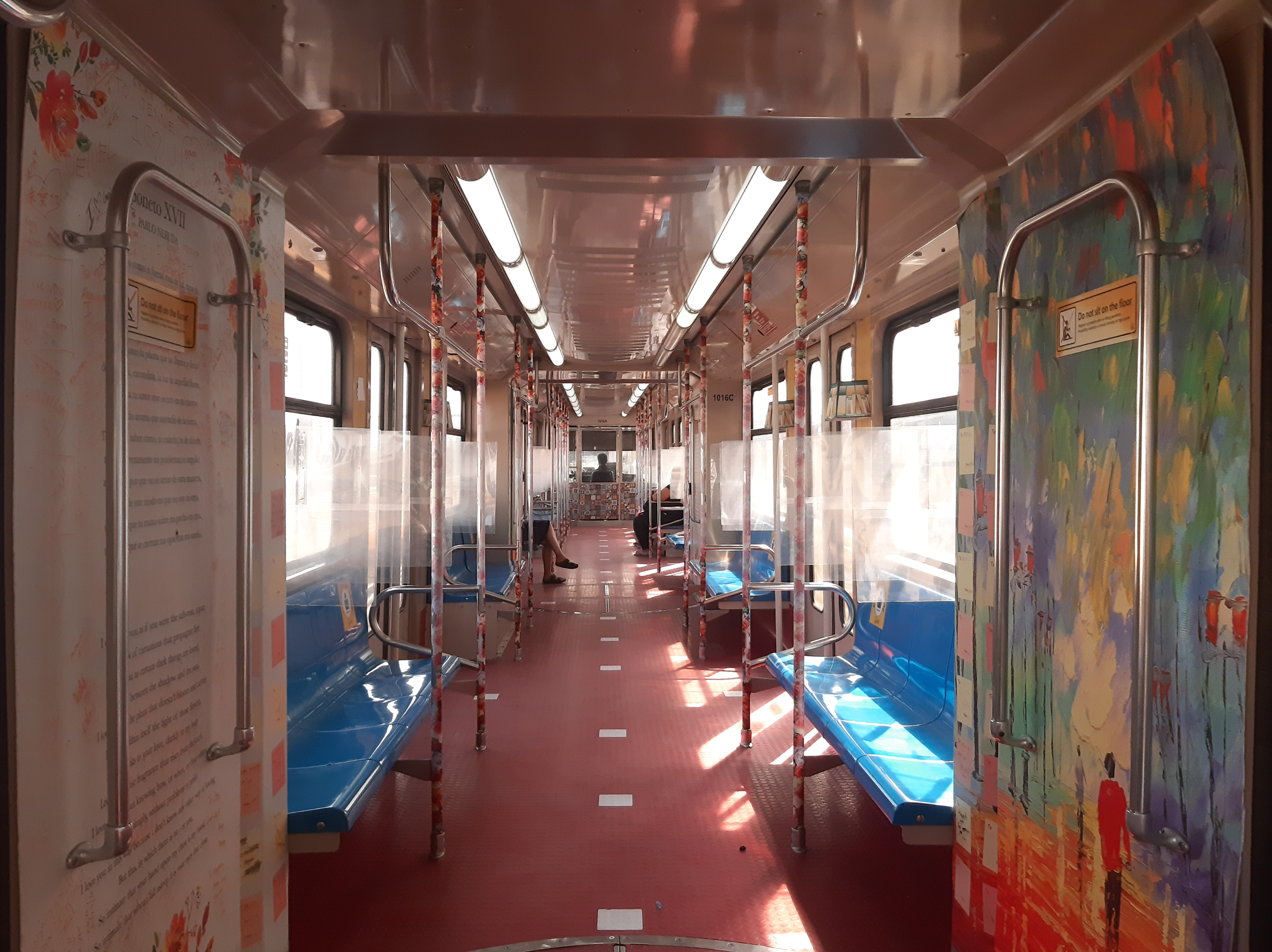
Interior of 1000 class LRV (second refurbishment)

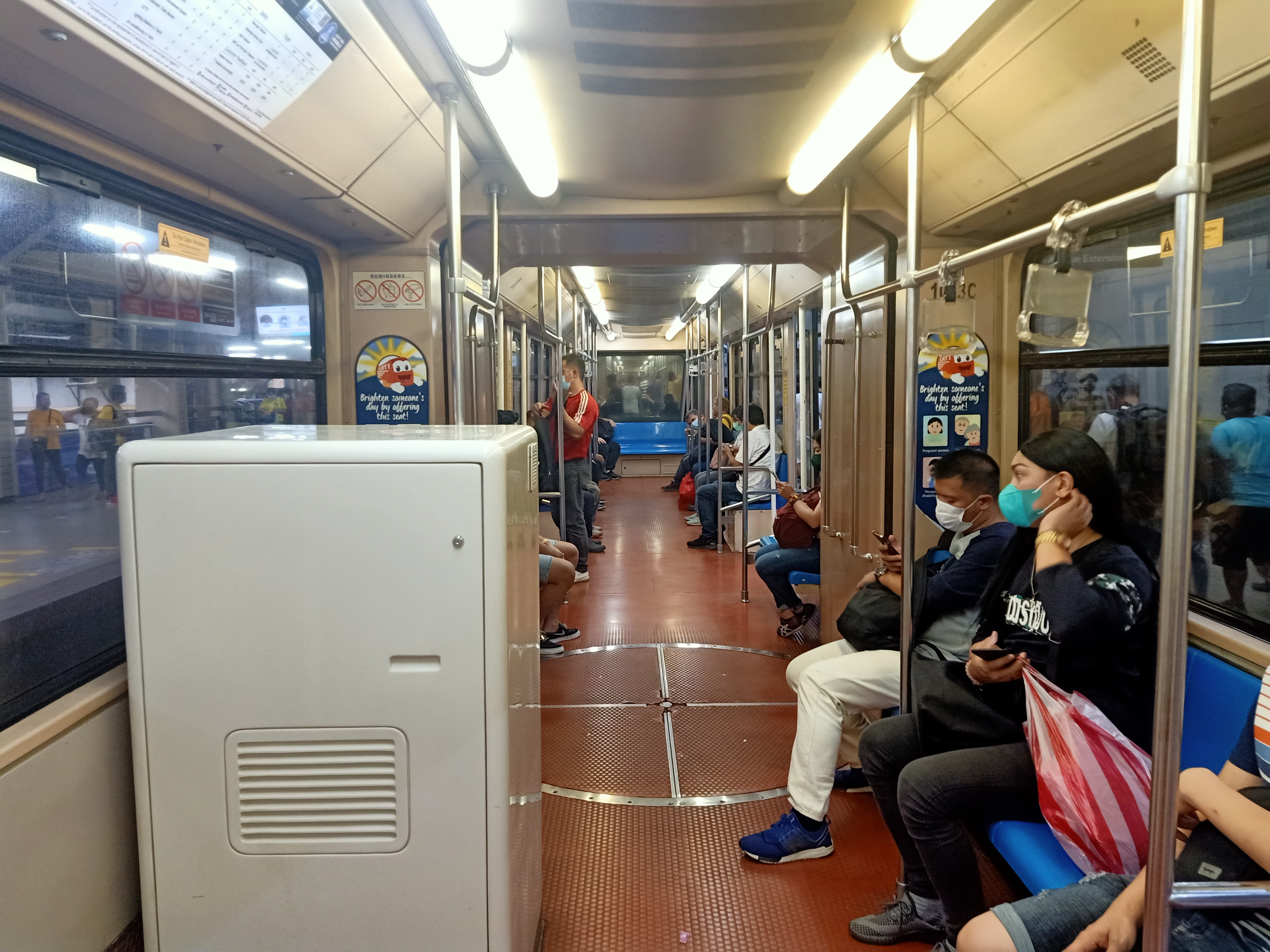
Interior with new Alstom signaling equipment on the left

=== Electrical and mechanical ===
A thyristor chopper traction control system is installed in the trains, powering two direct current (DC) straight-wound traction motors. Ateliers de Constructions Electriques de Charleroi (ACEC) manufactured the electrical and traction equipment for the trains.

Each LRV has four inside-frame bogies consisting of two motorized bogies at the ends of the LRV and two trailer bogies under the articulations. The primary suspension is a conical rubber, while the secondary suspension is a coil spring. Semi-permanent couplers are present at the ends of the non-cab section (section B) of the light rail vehicles.

=== Braking system ===
Dynamic brakes are used as a service brake. There are two disc brakes per trailer bogies acting as a service brake and two disc brakes per motor bogies used as an emergency and substitution brake. Each bogie has two electromagnetic track brakes for use in case of emergency.

The transmission is a bogie-mounted transmission consisting of a right-angle link drive transmitted via gears and two elastic couplings.

== Train formation ==
Each unidirectional light rail vehicle consists of three articulated cars.

Cars of 1000 class
Car designation		A-car	B-car	C-car
Control cab		Yes	No	No
Motor		Yes	No	Yes
Pantograph		Yes	No	No
Car length	m	31.72		
Car length	ft in	97 ft 8 53/64 in		
Capacity	Seated	81		
Capacity	Standing	293		
Capacity	Total	374		

== Incidents and accidents ==
- On December 30, 2000, Rizal Day, a train (car number 1037) exploded at Blumentritt station as part of a series of explosions in a terrorist attack known as the Rizal Day bombings. The attack on Line 1 killed some 22 people and injured hundreds. The damaged train was decommissioned immediately after the incident. No confirmed plans were announced on its ultimate fate, whether it would be restored or scrapped. The train, together with other trainsets involved in accidents, have been ultimately sold for scrap.
- On June 24, 2010, two trains (1G and 3G) collided at Balintawak station.
- On February 18, 2011, two trains (3G and 1G trains) collided near Roosevelt Station in Quezon City on Friday at the reversing tracks, around a kilometer away to the east. No passengers were injured. This caused the Roosevelt and Balintawak stations to remain closed for two months until the stations were reopened on April 11, 2011. An investigation was conducted and was shown that one of the drivers was texting when the incident occurred. As a result, LRV 1015 sustained damage.
- On May 23, 2015, thousands of passengers were stranded after a train of Line 1 slammed into another train near Monumento station. A train driver was hurt after the impact caused his head to slam into the dashboard of the train. The accident, later revealed to be caused by power fluctuation that affected the signalling system, forced passengers to alight from the station until services was restored around 1 pm at the same day.
- On March 10, 2016, a door in a 1G train car was left open while running between Central Terminal and Pedro Gil stations. The problem was fixed at the Pedro Gil station.
- On March 22, 2016, the doors of a 1G train car at the Central Terminal station failed to open, leaving passengers trapped inside the train.
- On September 26, 2016, a faulty door in a 1G train car suddenly slammed shut in less than a second. No one was injured.
- On September 26, 2018, a faulty 1G train door was unable to open at the Balintawak station. A passenger pushed the door open and was able to disembark. The next passenger pushed the door though it abruptly closed on him but managed to get through.
- On November 6, 2020, a 1G train car emitted smoke at Gil Puyat station at 2:00 PM due to a catenary fault. Passengers were evacuated, and the line implemented a provisional service from Balintawak to Central Terminal and vice versa. The situation normalized at 8:00 PM.

== Sources ==
- Japan International Cooperation Agency; Oriental Consultants Co., Ltd.; ALMEC Corporation; Katahira & Engineers International; Tonichi Engineering Consultants, Inc. (July 2013). Study on railway strategy for enhancement of railway network system in Metro Manila of the Republic of the Philippines: Final report, Vol.1-LRT Line 1: Cavite extension project (2013) (PDF) (Report). Archived (PDF) from the original on December 27, 2021.
- Japan International Cooperation Agency; Oriental Consultants Co., Ltd.; ALMEC Corporation; Katahira & Engineers International; Tonichi Engineering Consultants, Inc. (July 2013b). Study on railway strategy for enhancement of railway network system in Metro Manila of the Republic of the Philippines: Final report, Vol.1 LRT Line 1: Cavite extension project (2013) (PDF) (Report). Archived (PDF) from the original on December 27, 2021.
