= Radial Road 5 =

Road network in Luzon, Philippines

R-5 Radial Road 5

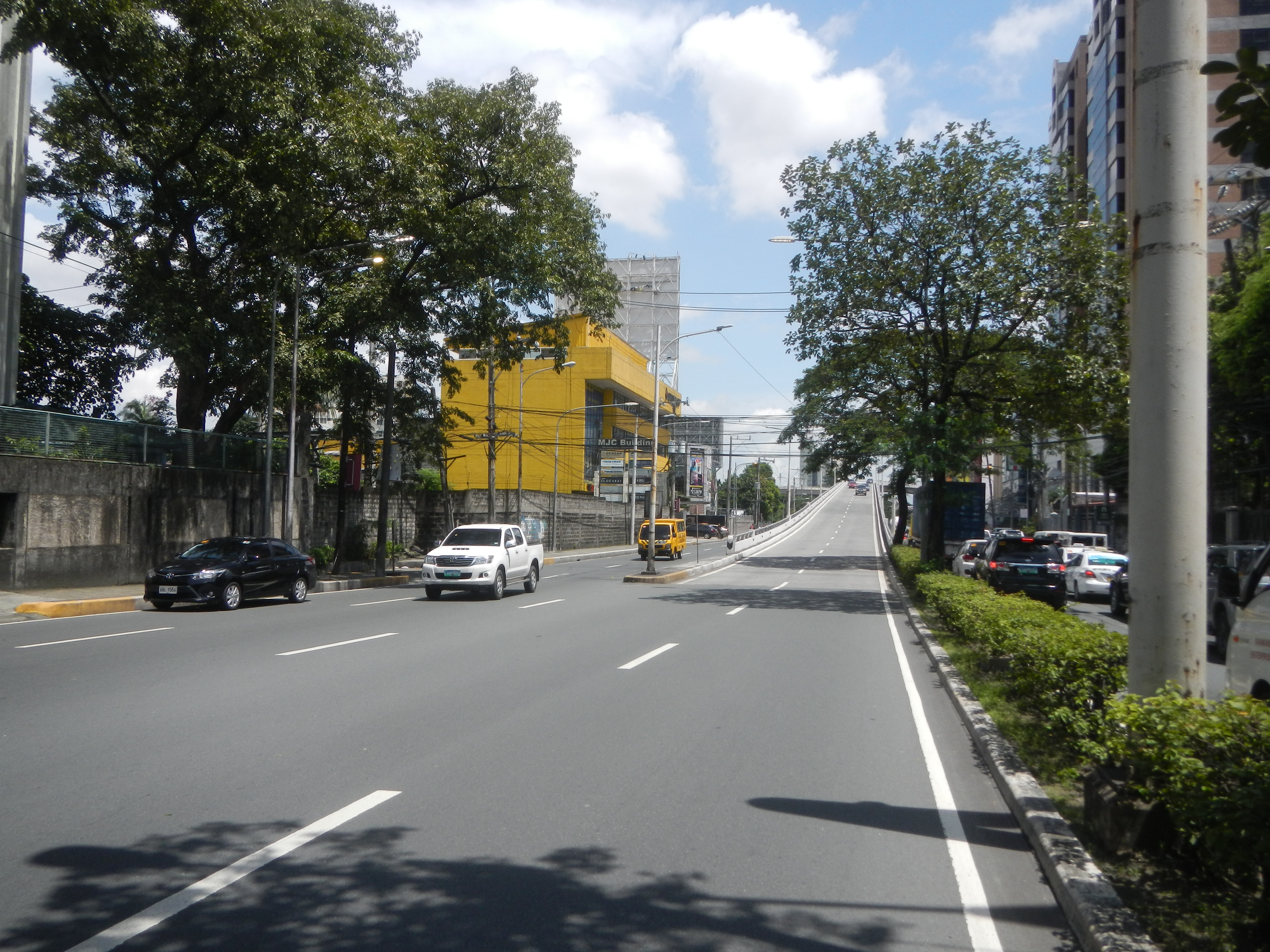
- Ortigas Avenue, part of R-5 road

Route information
- Maintained by Department of Public Works and Highways (entire route) and Metropolitan Manila Development Authority (Metro Manila segments only)
- Length: 97.9 km (60.8 mi)
- Component highways: N183 in Manila; N141 from Manila to Pasig; N60 from Pasig to Taytay; N601 from Taytay to Famy; N602 from Famy to Pagsanjan

Major junctions
- North end: N180 (Magsaysay Boulevard) in Manila
- South end: N66 (Calamba–Pagsanjan Road) / N603 (Pagsanjan–Cavinti Road) in Pagsanjan, Laguna

Location
- Country: Philippines
- Major cities: Manila, Mandaluyong, Pasig, and San Juan
- Towns: Cainta, Taytay, Angono, Binangonan, Cardona, Morong, Baras, Tanay, Pililla, Mabitac, Famy, Siniloan, Pangil, Pakil, Paete, Kalayaan, Lumban, Pagsanjan

Highway system
- Roads in the Philippines; Highways; Expressways; List

Radial Road 5, informally known as the R-5 Road, is a network of roads and bridges which comprise the fifth arterial road of Metro Manila in the Philippines. The road links the city of Manila with Mandaluyong and Pasig in the east, leading out of Metro Manila into the province of Rizal and south towards Laguna. It is the only arterial road traversing the east side of Laguna de Bay.

== Current route ==
Based on 2024 data from the Department of Public Works and Highways, Radial Road 5 consists of Ortigas Avenue from the Ortigas Interchange to the Metro Manila-Rizal border at the Sapang Bato-Buli Creek.

For traffic management purposes, the Metropolitan Manila Development Authority designates its Radial Road 5 separately, the same as the DPWH alignment.

== Original route ==
The route was originally planned outwards from Manila towards Rizal province, consisting of Victorino Mapa Street, P. Sanchez Street, Shaw Boulevard, and Pasig Boulevard until the Circumferential Road 5–Ortigas Avenue Interchange and Ortigas Avenue in Metro Manila. It then continues on Ortigas Avenue into Rizal province as Ortigas Avenue Extension, Taytay Diversion Road, and Manila East Road, which goes further into the province.

=== Victorino Mapa Street ===
R-5 begins as Victorino Mapa Street in Santa Mesa, Manila from the intersection with Magsaysay Boulevard to where it connects to P. Sanchez Street at a junction with Victorino Mapa Street Extension. It is the main north–south road of Santa Mesa.

=== P. Sanchez Street ===
R-5 is known as P. Sanchez Street along the rest of the route in Santa Mesa. Named after Francisco de Paula Sanchez, a Jesuit priest from the Ateneo Municipal de Manila, it links Santa Mesa to Mandaluyong east of the San Juan River.

=== Shaw Boulevard ===
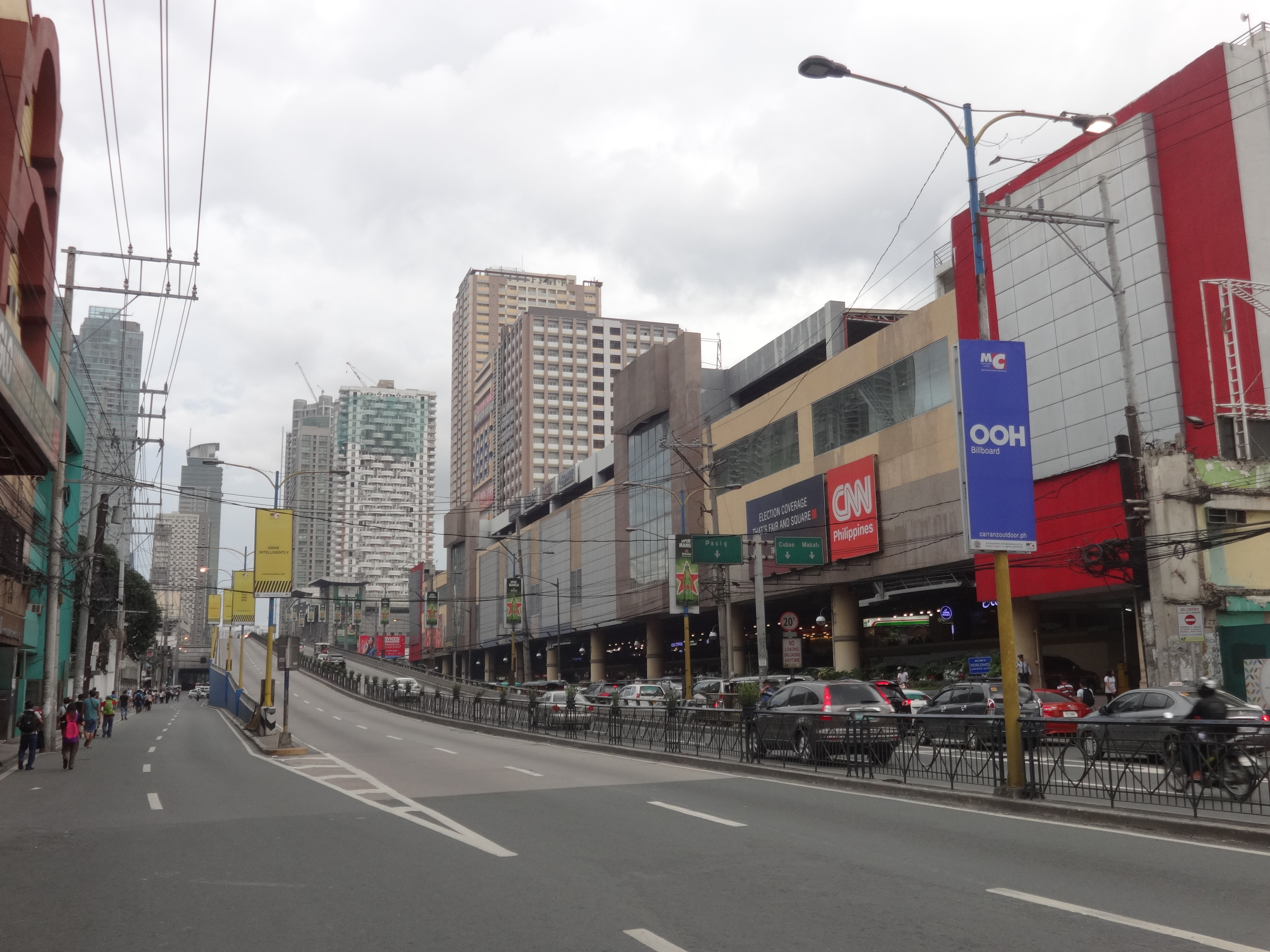
Shaw Boulevard in Mandaluyong

The main segment of R-5 in Mandaluyong and Pasig is known as Shaw Boulevard. Padre Sanchez Street merges with Shaw Boulevard at the intersection with General Kalentong Street. It travels east-southeast near the border with San Juan, passing through the Wack Wack Golf and Country Club before arriving at the intersection with Epifanio de los Santos Avenue (C-4). East of EDSA, R-5 forms the southern boundary of the Ortigas Center business district and quickly enters the city of Pasig after crossing San Miguel Avenue. It passes through the Capitol Commons development at the former Rizal Provincial Capitol complex before turning south on Pasig Boulevard at the junction with Hillcrest Drive in Bagong Ilog, Pasig.

=== Pasig Boulevard ===
Between Shaw Boulevard and Eulogio Rodriguez Jr. Avenue (C-5), R-5 is known as Pasig Boulevard. It marks the boundary between barangays Kapitolyo and Bagong Ilog, running north–south towards the Pasig River before turning east towards C-5 by the Rizal Medical Center.

=== Ortigas Avenue ===
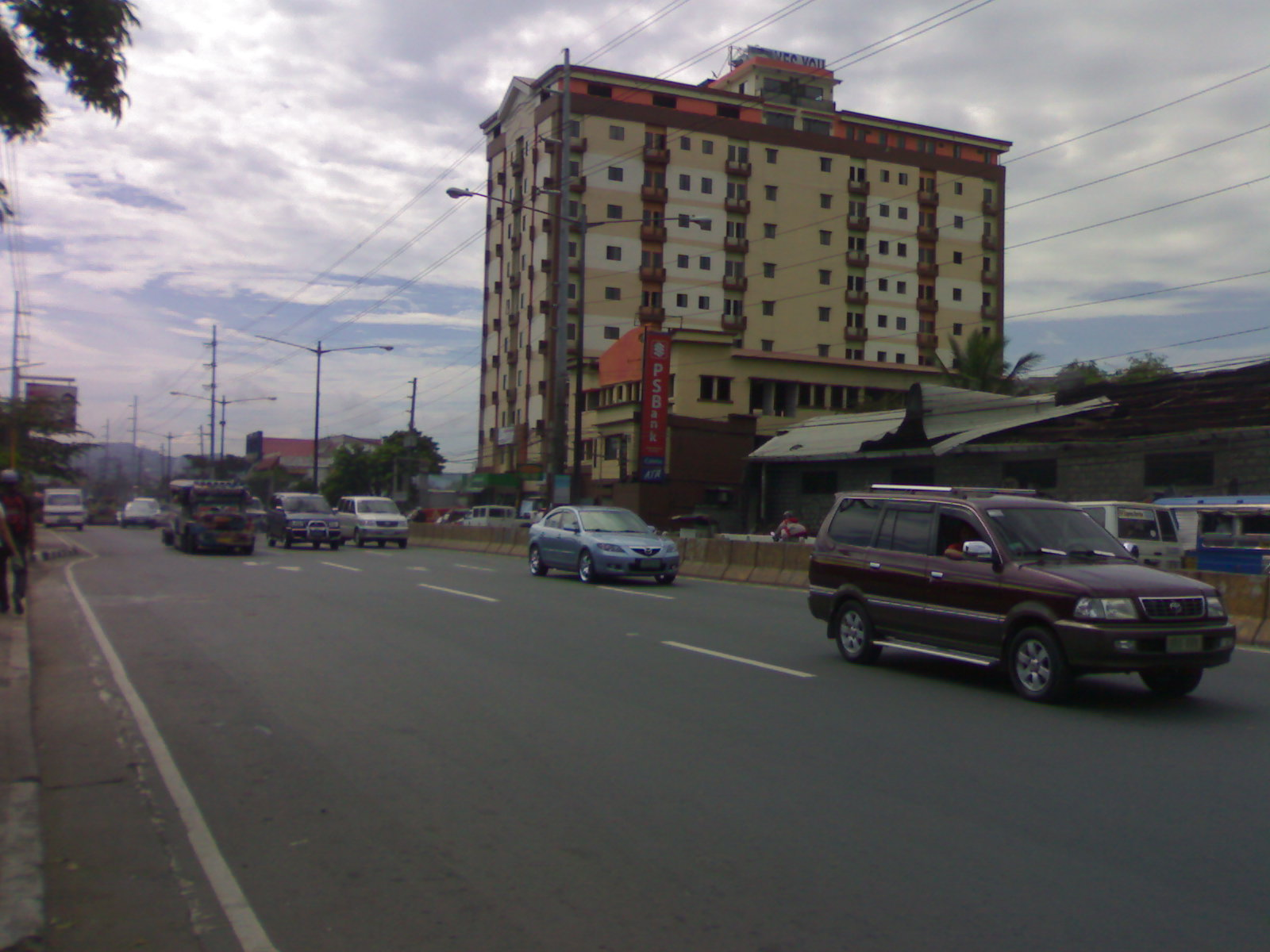
Ortigas Avenue in Cainta, Rizal

The area of the old city proper of Pasig (Malinao, etc.) east of Bagong Ilog from Pasig Boulevard has a short and narrow street layout. Hence, R-5 follows C-5 northbound and continues its eastward route along Ortigas Avenue towards Rizal. From Rosario, Pasig, R-5 passes through the municipalities of Cainta and Taytay, turning south on Taytay Diversion Road at the Tikling Junction.

=== Taytay Diversion Road ===
SM City Taytay

Between Ortigas Avenue Extension and the Manila East Road, R-5 is known as the Taytay Diversion Road. It runs north–south traversing the Taytay poblacion of Dolores, where SM City Taytay is located.

=== Manila East Road ===
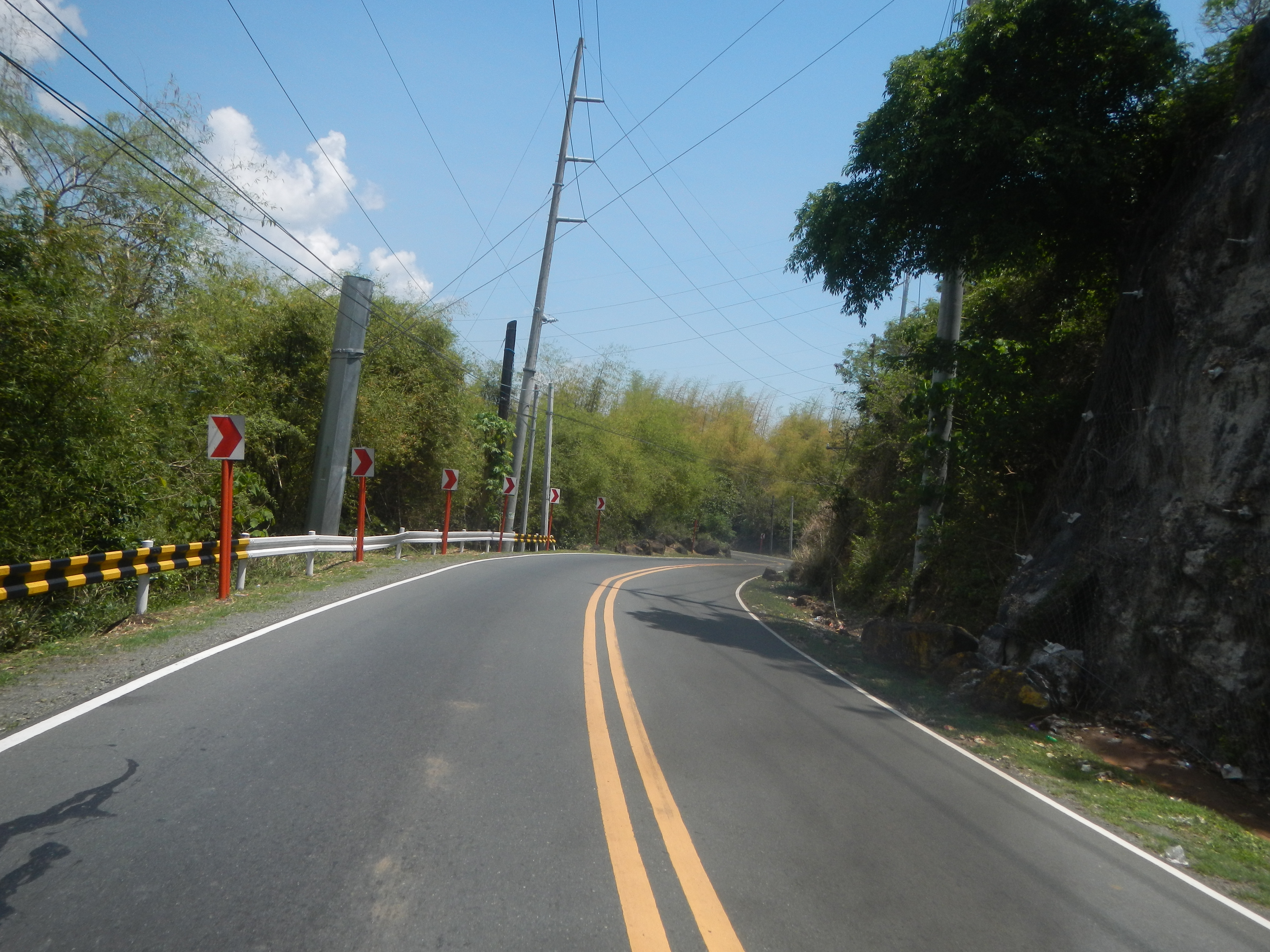
Manila East Road in Pililla, Rizal

R-5 in the rest of southern Rizal and eastern Laguna province is known as the Manila East Road. It travels east-southeast, mostly along the shore of Laguna de Bay from Angono to Pililla. It crosses the Sierra Madre border between Rizal and Laguna and continues along the lakeshore from Mabitac south towards Pagsanjan.

== See also ==
- List of roads in Metro Manila
