= Felix Avenue =

Road in Metro Manila and Rizal, Philippines

F. P. Felix Avenue

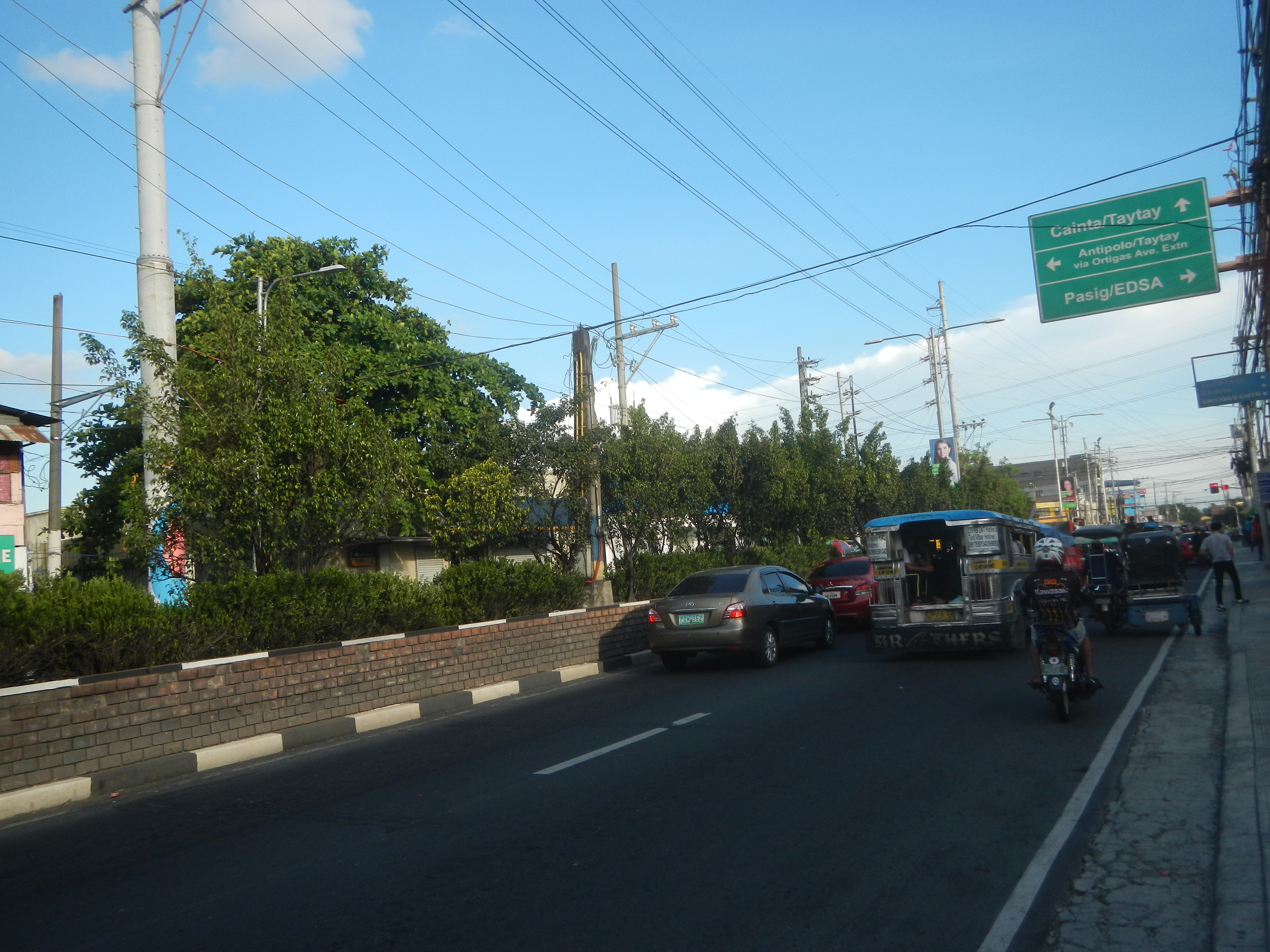
- Felix Avenue southbound at the Cainta Junction

Route information
- Maintained by the Department of Public Works and Highways
- Length: 2.643 km (1.642 mi)
- Component highways: N601

Major junctions
- North end: N59 (Marcos Highway) / Gil Fernando Avenue in Marikina
- South end: N60 (Ortigas Avenue) / N601 (A. Bonifacio Avenue) in Cainta

Location
- Country: Philippines
- Regions: Metro Manila, Calabarzon
- Major cities: Marikina, Pasig
- Towns: Cainta

Highway system
- Roads in the Philippines; Highways; Expressways; List

F.P. Felix Avenue (Filipino: Abenida F.P. Felix), also called by its former name Imelda Avenue (Filipino: Abenida Imelda), is a four-lane major road which connects Marcos Highway to Ortigas Avenue Extension. It is one of the busiest roads in Cainta, Rizal, Philippines. The road is named after Francisco P. Felix, the longest-serving Mayor of Cainta from 1927 to 1941 and from 1945 until his death in 1980. It also serves as a boundary of Cainta and Pasig. It highly accessible by jeepneys, taxis, UV Express, tricycles, and private vehicles.

Previously a tertiary national road, it was upgraded in 2025 to a secondary national road and reassigned as a component of National Route 601 (N601) of the Philippine highway network.

== Proposed integration with C-6 Road ==
This avenue is also on a proposal to become one of the service road segments of Circumferential Road 6, it will be later called "Lower C-6" connecting with Gil Fernando Avenue in Marikina, it intersects with Batasan–San Mateo Road, then intersects Commonwealth Avenue (segment of R-7 Road) in Quezon City until the very end point of "Lower C-6" at the corner between Lias Road and MacArthur Highway in Marilao, Bulacan. Meanwhile, the Southeast Metro Manila Expressway (SEMME) also known as Skyway Stage 4 or C-6 Expressway will be called "Upper C-6". And both upper and lower segments will intersect the North Luzon Expressway (NLEX) along Lias Road in arilao.

== Intersections ==
Province	City/Municipality	km	mi	Destinations	Notes
Rizal	Cainta			N60 (Ortigas Avenue)	Traffic light intersection; Southern terminus. Continues to Cainta as N601 (A. Bonifacio Avenue).
Rizal	Cainta			London Street	Access to Vista Verde Country Homes.
Rizal	Cainta			Village East Avenue	Access to Village East Executive Homes.
Pasig–Cainta boundary				Vista Verde Avenue Extension	
Pasig–Cainta boundary				Kaginhawaan Road	Southbound access only.
Pasig–Cainta boundary				Kapayapaan Road	
Pasig–Cainta boundary				Kabayanihan Road	
Pasig–Cainta boundary				Karangalan Drive	
Pasig–Cainta boundary				Kayamanan Street	Northbound and southbound exit only
Pasig–Cainta boundary				Kayumanggi Street	Northbound and southbound entrance only
Hakbangan Creek					
Pasig–Cainta boundary				Jasmine Street / Hawaii Street	No access to opposite directions. Jasmine Street is closed and Hawaii Street is accessible to residents of Pasig Greenpark Village.
Pasig–Cainta boundary				Benito Soliven Avenue	Accessible to residents of Cainta Greenpark Village only.
Rizal	Cainta			V.V. Soliven Avenue I	
Rizal	Cainta			Sta. Lucia Drive	Access to Sta. Lucia Mall.
Rizal	Cainta			V.V. Soliven Avenue II	Northbound access only.
Rizal	Cainta			V.V. Soliven Avenue III	Northbound access only.
Marikina				N59 (Marikina–Infanta Highway)	Access to opposite directions via u-turn slot; Northern terminus. Continues to Marikina as Gil Fernando Avenue.
1.000 mi = 1.609 km; 1.000 km = 0.621 mi: Closed/former; Incomplete access

== Landmarks ==
Sta. Lucia East, Q. Plaza, ICCT College Cainta, Charm Residences, Greenpark Executive Village in Pasig and Karangalan Village in Cainta are the well-known landmarks in this road.
