= Ortigas Avenue =

Major Metro Manila-Rizal arterial

Coordinates: 14°35′45″N 121°3′17″E

R-5 Ortigas Avenue

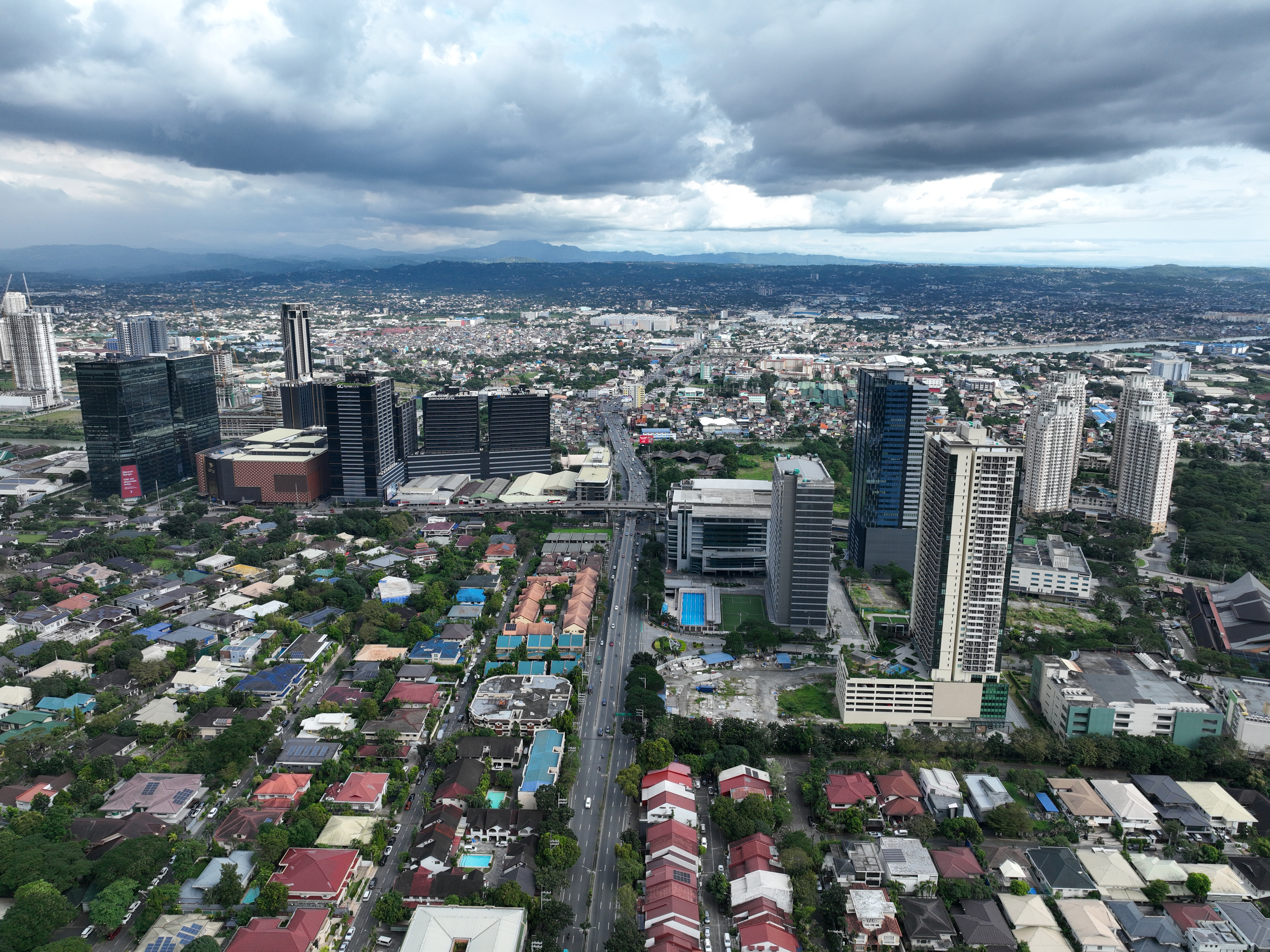
- Aerial view of Ortigas Avenue (2026)

Route information
- Maintained by Department of Public Works and Highways
- Length: 12.1 km (7.5 mi) Including extension from Pasig to Taytay
- Component highways: R-5 R-5; N60 from Quezon City to Taytay; N184 in San Juan and Mandaluyong

Major junctions
- West end: N184 (Bonny Serrano Avenue) at the Quezon City–San Juan boundary
- AH26 (EDSA); N11 (Circumferential Road 5); N601 (Bonifacio Avenue / Felix Avenue); N60 (Taytay Diversion Road)
- East end: N60 (Corazon C. Aquino Avenue / Taytay Diversion Road) / L. Wood Street in Taytay

Location
- Country: Philippines
- Regions: Metro Manila, Calabarzon
- Provinces: Rizal
- Major cities: San Juan, Mandaluyong, Quezon City, Pasig
- Towns: Cainta, Taytay

Highway system
- Roads in the Philippines; Highways; Expressways; List

Ortigas Avenue is a 12.1 km (7.5 mi) highway connecting eastern Metro Manila and western Rizal in the Philippines. It is one of the busiest highways in Metro Manila, serving as the main thoroughfare of the metro's east–west corridor, catering mainly to traffic to and from Rizal.

The western terminus of the highway is at the boundary of San Juan and Quezon City. The highway then traverses through Ortigas Center and along the cities of Mandaluyong, Quezon City, and Pasig, followed by the municipality of Cainta, and finally ending in the municipality of Taytay. Its section from Dr. Sixto Antonio Avenue in Pasig to Felix Avenue in Cainta is also part of the Manila East Road.

The portion of Ortigas Avenue from EDSA–Ortigas Interchange, Quezon City to the Buli Bridge at the Pasig–Cainta boundary is designated as Radial Road 5 (R-5). The highway is also designated as National Route 60 (N60) and National Route 184 (N184) of the Philippine highway network, respectively.

== Etymology ==
The highway is named after Filipino lawyer and businessman Don Francisco Emilio Barcinas Ortigas Sr. (1875–1935), popularly known as "Don Paco" or simply Francisco Ortigas. Ortigas is known for establishing a partnership with several businessmen (now Ortigas & Company) in 1931 to purchase the 4,033-hectare (9,970-acre) Hacienda de Mandaluyon from the Augustinian Order, which now spans the cities of San Juan, Mandaluyong, Pasig, and Quezon City.

== Route description ==
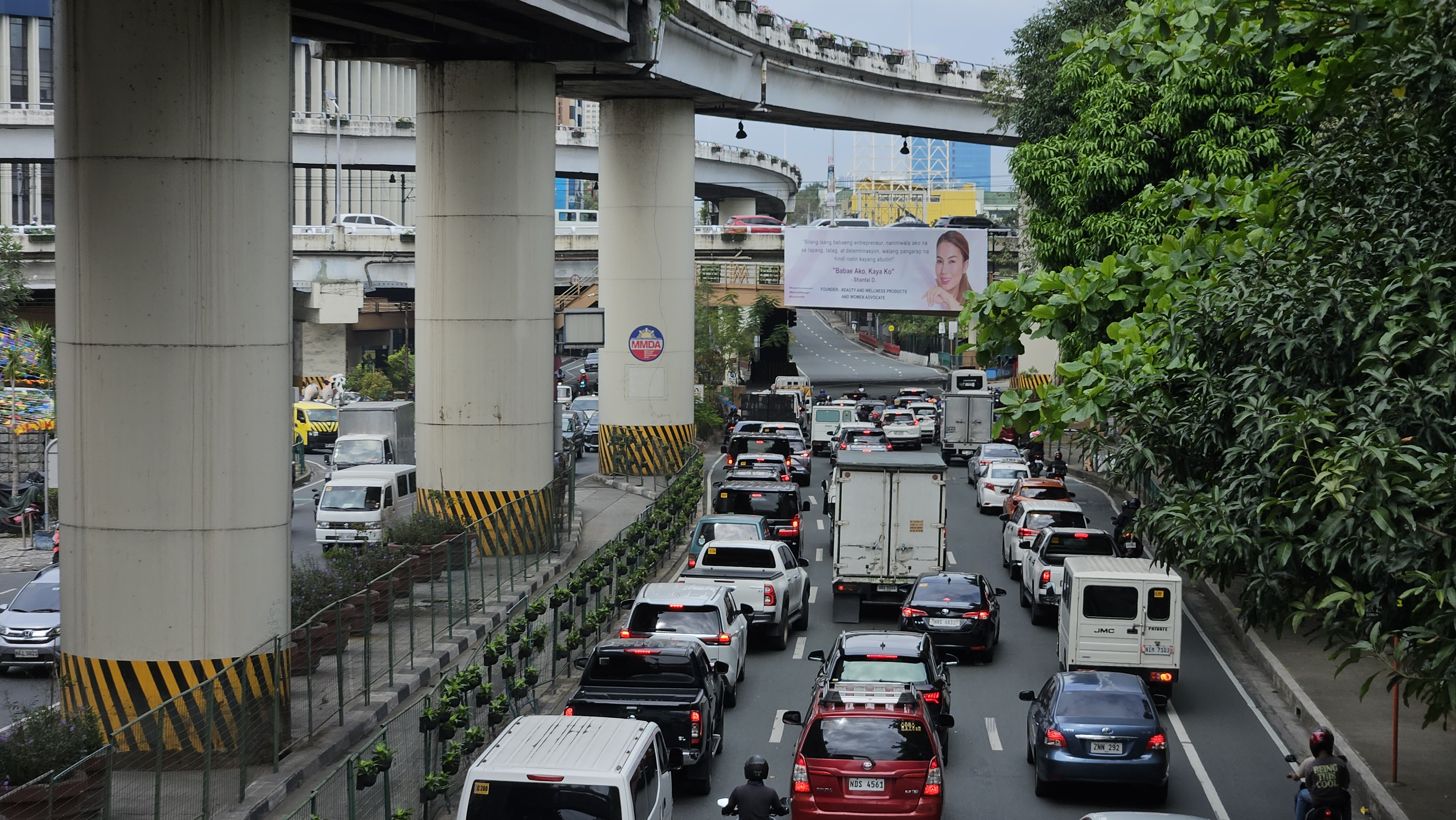
Ortigas Avenue facing west towards Mandaluyong at the EDSA-Ortigas Interchange in Quezon City

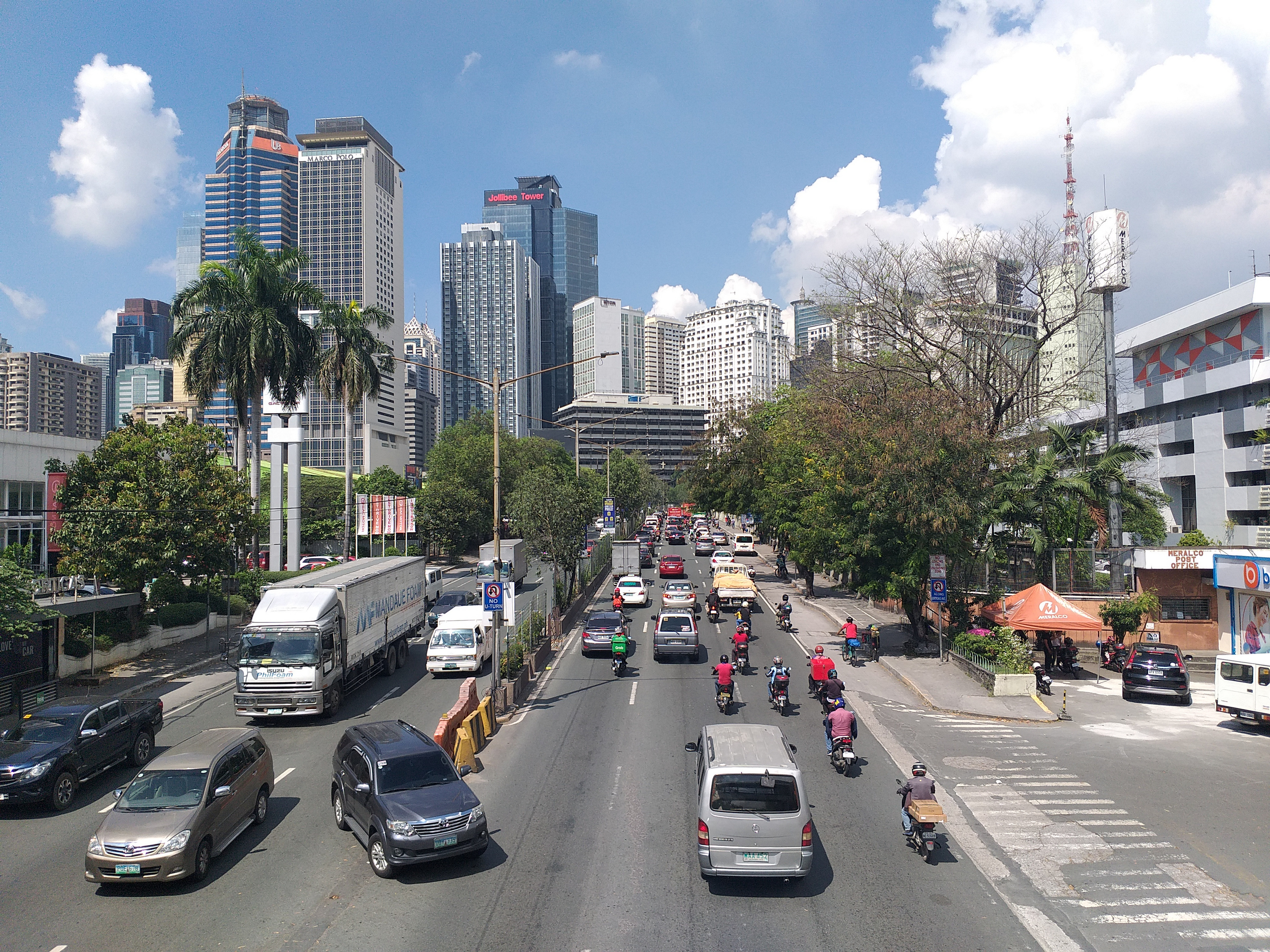
Looking west towards Ortigas Center

Ortigas Avenue cuts eastwards from the city boundary of San Juan and Quezon City in Metro Manila to Antipolo in Rizal, passing through residential, industrial, and commercial areas, including Ortigas Center, its namesake central business district. Its section from Bonny Serrano Avenue to EDSA forms part of National Route 184 (N184), a secondary national road under the Philippine highway network. Meanwhile, the rest of the route east of EDSA forms part of National Route 60 (N60), a primary national road. Eastwards past the C5–Ortigas Interchange in Pasig, the avenue is called Ortigas Avenue Extension. Its section from Dr. Sixto Antonio Avenue in Pasig to Felix Avenue at the Cainta Junction is officially known as Pasig–Cainta Road and forms part of the Manila East Road. From Cainta Junction to Kaytikling Rotunda in Taytay, it is alternatively known as Cainta-Kayticling-Antipolo-Teresa-Morong Road.

Ortigas Avenue starts as a physical continuation of Granada Street past Bonny Serrano Avenue at the boundary of San Juan and Quezon City. It then cuts through Greenhills, San Juan and northeast of Wack Wack Golf and Country Club in Mandaluyong. It crosses EDSA at the EDSA–Ortigas Interchange at the boundary of Mandaluyong and Quezon City, and marks the northern border of Ortigas Center, before making a slight curve at Meralco Avenue. The avenue soon cuts through Ugong, enters Pasig, and crosses Circumferential Road 5 at the C5–Ortigas Interchange, where the Bridgetowne development is located. It soon crosses the Marikina River and Manggahan Floodway, entering the barangay of Rosario, still in Pasig. The avenue partially becomes a single carriageway, changing back into a dual carriageway, and then enters the province of Rizal at Cainta, past SM City East Ortigas (formerly Ever Gotesco Ortigas).

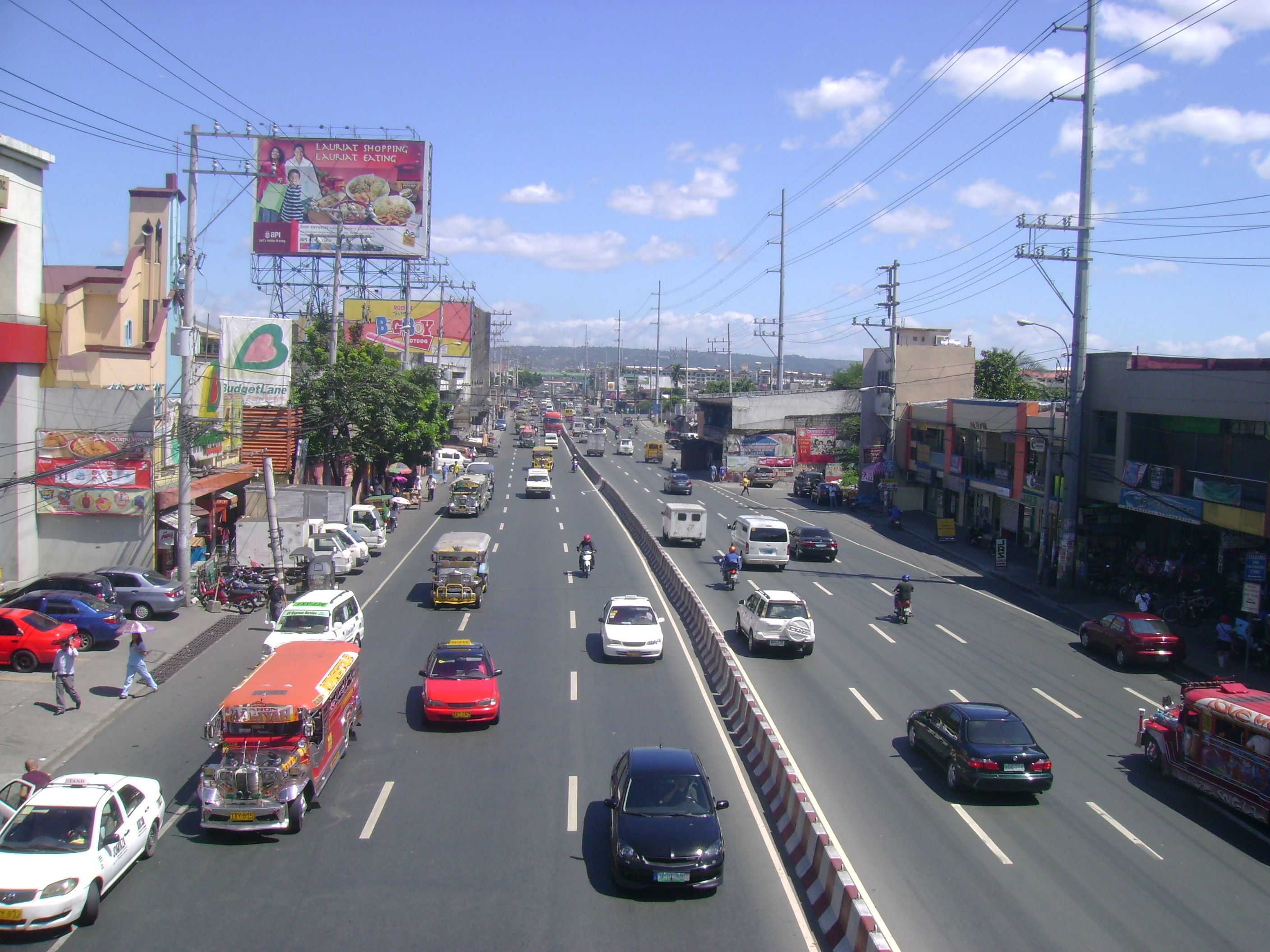
View of the avenue eastwards in Rosario, Pasig

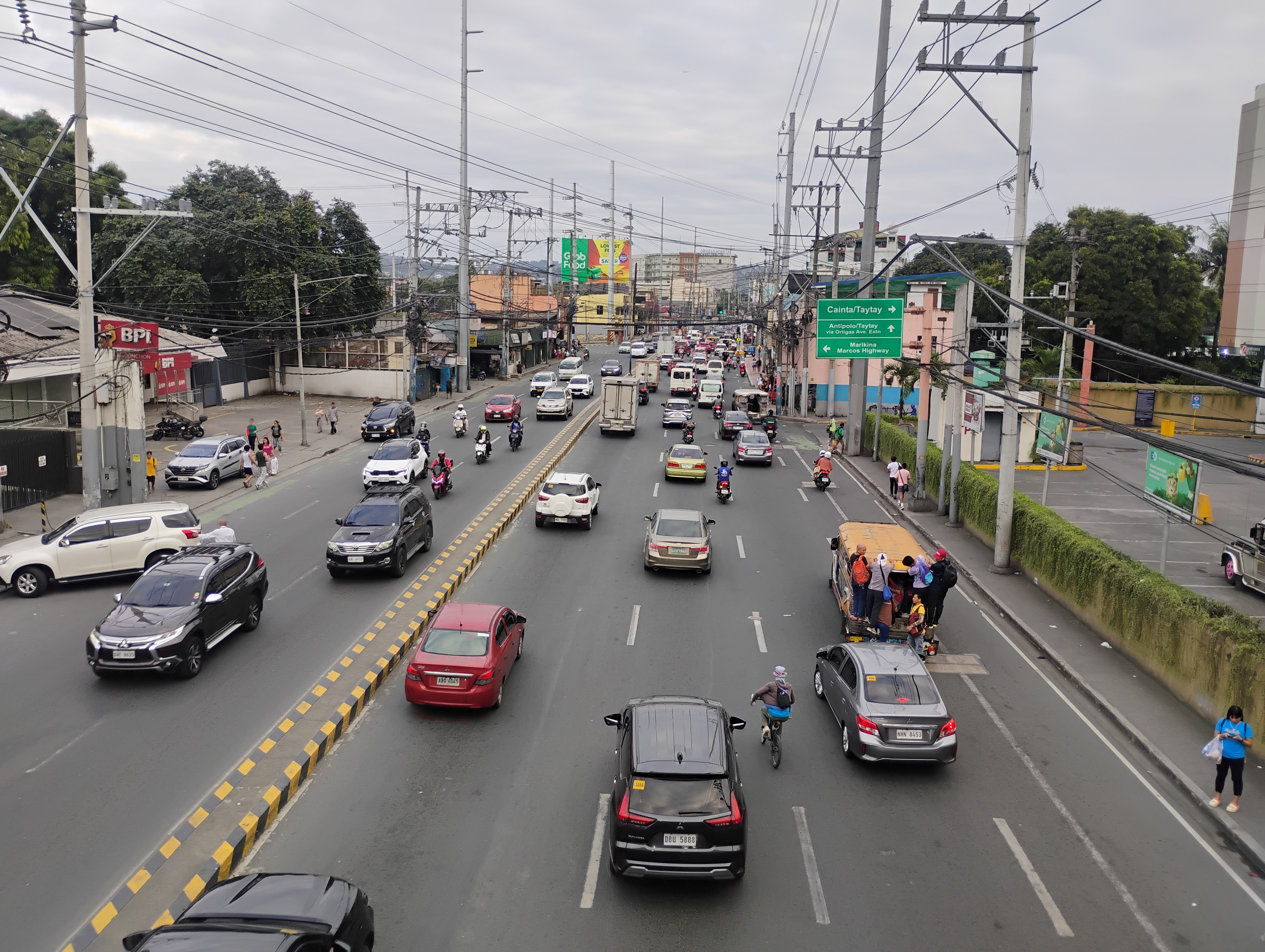
The avenue in Cainta, Rizal

It crosses Bonifacio and Felix Avenues at Cainta Junction. It then continues to Taytay and passes over the Kaytikling Rotunda with Taytay Diversion Road in Taytay, Rizal before continuing as Manila East Road.

=== Bicycle lanes ===
Most of the road inside Metro Manila has Class II paint-separated one-way bicycle lanes as part of the Metropolitan Bike Lane Network. Additionally, the entire span of Ortigas Avenue from Bonny Serrano Avenue to Connecticut Street in San Juan has bollards as protection. However, these bollards are frequently damaged by motorists who intrude into the bicycle lanes, as the San Juan city government has struggled to regularly replace damaged bollards since its implementation in 2020.

On August 18, 2023, San Juan Mayor Francis Zamora issued an advisory stating that the city has removed the bollards along the Ortigas Avenue bicycle lanes to be replaced with cat's eye markers. The advisory stated that this was done following a "thorough evaluation" conducted by the Metropolitan Manila Development Authority to "restore roads to their optimal capacity" due to "congestion and a reduction in road capacity".

=== Elevated railway ===
The Manila Metro Rail Transit Line 4 (MRT-4) is a proposed fully elevated railway mass-transit system connecting the Ortigas Center area in Quezon City to Taytay. The project is planned to have 10 stations along an approximately 13.4 km (8.3 mi) alignment.

The Asian Infrastructure Investment Bank (AIIB) describes the MRT-4 as a high-capacity railway mass-transit system with an elevated viaduct approximately 12.7 km (7.9 mi) long and 10 stations. A March 2023 AIIB market-engagement notice described the project as a "fully-elevated railway mass-transit system" and stated that the preliminary design consisted of an approximately 13 km (8.1 mi) railway with 10 stations.

The project's Environmental Impact Statement and technical annexes provide further documentation on the proposed alignment, elevated structures, stations, and associated railway facilities.

=== Proposal for an elevated expressway (R-5/Ortigas Expressway) ===
Ireka Construction Berhad, a Malaysian company, and EEI Corporation entered into a memorandum of understanding in 1996 to construct the elevated highway as part of a joint venture with the Philippine National Construction Corporation (PNCC). This would have been the Philippines' first elevated road of this length, similar to the Metro Manila Skyway.

In 1999, a joint venture of Strategic Alliance Development Corporation (STRADEC), Marubeni, and Kumagai Gumi under the build-operate transfer (BOT) scheme proposed the construction of a 5.7-kilometer (3.5 mi) 6-lane Ortigas Expressway as a multi-story structure over the existing Ortigas Avenue Extension from E. Rodriguez (junction with C-5) to the Circumferential Road 6. No new proposals were made since then.

== Intersections ==
Province	City/Municipality	km	mi	Destinations	Notes
Quezon City–San Juan boundary		9	5.6	Bonny Serrano Avenue	Traffic light intersection. Western terminus. Continues west as Granada Street.
San Juan				Xavier Street	Restricted eastbound access for North Greenhills. Former westbound access for heavy traffic in the Xavier School vicinity.
San Juan		9	5.6	Madison Street	Traffic light intersection. Access for North Greenhills and the Xavier School-ICA vicinity.
San Juan				Roosevelt Street	Traffic light intersection. No left turn on both sides. Access for North Greenhills and West Greenhills.
San Juan				Club Filipino Drive	Traffic light intersection. Provides access to the Greenhills Shopping Center.
San Juan		10	6.2	Wilson Street	Traffic light intersection. Provides access to the Greenhills Shopping Center.
San Juan–Mandaluyong boundary				Connecticut Street	Traffic light intersection. Access for West Greenhills and the Greenhills Shopping Center. No left turn from westbound.
Mandaluyong				La Salle Street	Former westbound access to Greenhills East.
Mandaluyong				Holy Cross Street	Former westbound access to Greenhills East.
Mandaluyong		11	6.8	Notre Dame Street	Eastbound access only. Access for Wack-Wack Village.
Mandaluyong				Columbia Street	Eastbound access served by a U-turn slot. Access for Greenhills East.
Mandaluyong–Quezon City boundary				AH26 (Epifanio de los Santos Avenue)	EDSA–Ortigas Interchange. Traffic light intersection below interchange. Route number change from N184 to N60. Start of R-5 concurrency.
Quezon City				Arcadia Avenue	Westbound access only. Access for Arcadia Village.
Quezon City				ADB Avenue	Eastbound access only. Traffic light intersection on the eastbound side.
Quezon City				Zalameda Street	Westbound access only. Access for Corinthian Gardens.
Quezon City–Pasig boundary				E. Abello Street	Westbound access only.
Pasig		12.1	7.5	F. Ortigas Jr. Road	Eastbound access only.
Pasig				Meralco Avenue	Traffic light intersection.
Pasig				Gardner Street	Westbound access only. Access for Meralco Sports Club.
Pasig		13	8.1	Royal Palm Street	Eastbound access only. Access for Valle Verde IV.
Pasig				M. D. Camacho Road	Westbound access only.
Pasig				Lanuza Avenue	Traffic light intersection.
Pasig				Green Meadows Avenue	Traffic light intersection.
Pasig				Central Avenue	Eastbound access only.
Pasig		14	8.7	N11 (Eulogio Rodriguez Jr. Avenue)	Traffic light intersection under interchange. Left turns from westbound service road provided by U-turn under Ortigas Flyover.
Pasig				West Drive	Access from westbound service road only.
Pasig				Rosario Bridge over Marikina River	
Pasig				Dr. Sixto Antonio Avenue / ROTC Street	Left turns from westbound provided by U-turn under Rosario Bridge. Start of Manila East Road.
Pasig				Eulogio Amang Rodriguez Avenue	Right-in, right out. Left turns via U-turn slots.
Pasig		15	9.3	C. Raymundo Avenue / Tramo Street	Left turns provided by U-turn locations
Pasig		15.5	9.6	West Bank Road	Eastbound exit and westbound entrance. U-turn location used for left turns from Sixto Antonio and C. Raymundo intersections.
Pasig				Ortigas Bridge over Manggahan Floodway	
Pasig				East Bank Road	Westbound exit and eastbound entrance.
Pasig				President Quezon Street	Westbound access only.
Pasig				De Castro Avenue	Eastbound access only.
Pasig				Pearl Street	
Pasig				Melbourne Street	
Pasig				Countryside Avenue	
Pasig				Monaco Street	
Pasig				Riverside Drive	
Pasig				Saint Joseph Drive	
Pasig				Kamagong Sur Street	Restricted westbound access.
Pasig				5th Avenue	
Buli Creek				Cainta-Buli Bridge	
Rizal	Cainta			Malinis Street	Westbound access only.
Rizal	Cainta			Gloria Extension	Eastbound access only.
Rizal	Cainta	18	11	N601 (Bonifacio Avenue / Felix Avenue)	Cainta Crossing. Traffic light intersection. End of Manila East Road (Rosario–Cainta Road) segment.
Rizal	Cainta			Brookside Drive	Unsignaled intersection.
Rizal	Cainta			Sunrise Drive	
Rizal	Cainta			Marlo Drive	Eastbound access only.
Rizal	Cainta			Sunset Drive / J.G. Garcia Sr. Street	Access from opposite directions accessible via U-turn slot. Former traffic light intersection.
Rizal	Cainta			Robin Street	
Rizal	Cainta	20	12	Hunters ROTC Guerilla Street	
Rizal	Cainta			Eagle Street	Westbound access only.
Rizal	Cainta–Taytay boundary			General A. Ricarte Street / Don Celso Tuason Street	Traffic light intersection.
Rizal	Cainta–Taytay boundary			Sampaloc Street	Eastbound access only.
Rizal	Cainta–Taytay boundary			Santol Street	Eastbound access only.
Rizal	Cainta–Taytay boundary			Tanguille Street	Eastbound access only.
Rizal	Cainta–Taytay boundary			Suburban Drive	Unsignaled intersection
Rizal	Taytay			Dao Street	Eastbound access only.
Rizal	Taytay			Narra Street	
Rizal	Taytay			E. Rodriguez Avenue	Traffic light intersection.
Rizal	Taytay			N. Pascual Street	Eastbound access only.
Rizal	Taytay			Baltao Street	
Rizal	Taytay			Pearl Avenue	Eastbound access only.
Rizal	Taytay			Palmera Avenue	
Rizal	Taytay	21	13	N60 (Corazon C. Aquino Avenue / Taytay Diversion Road) / L. Wood Street	Roundabout (Kaytiking Rotunda). Eastern terminus. End of N60 and R-5 designations; Future interchange with the Southeast Metro Manila Expressway.
1.000 mi = 1.609 km; 1.000 km = 0.621 mi: Closed/former; Concurrency terminus; Incomplete access; Route transition

== Landmarks ==
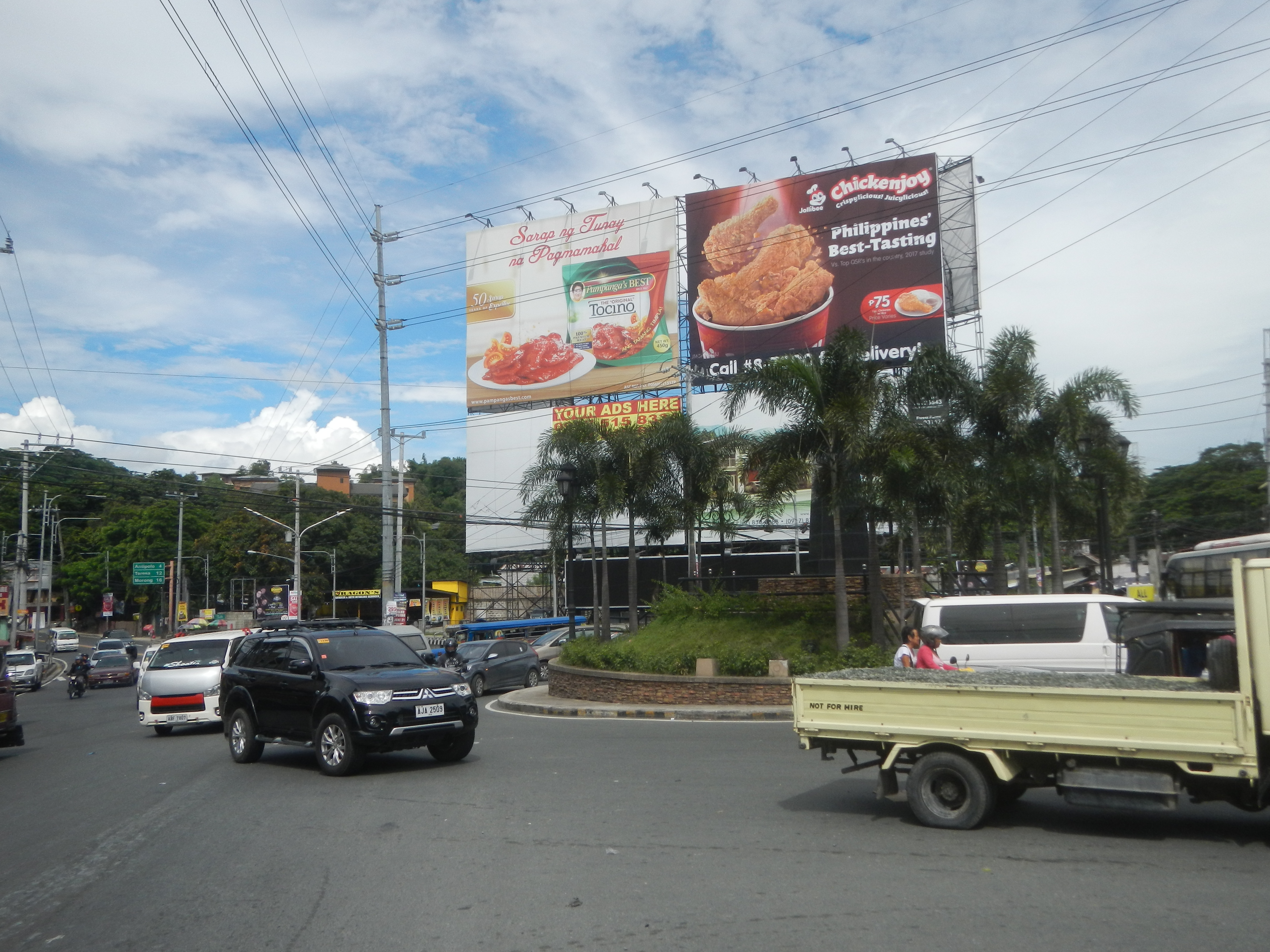
Kaytikling Rotunda in Taytay, Rizal

This list is from Bonny Serrano Avenue at the northwest to the Kaytikling Rotonda at the southeast:

=== San Juan ===
- Greenhills

=== Mandaluyong ===
- Wack Wack Golf and Country Club
- La Salle Green Hills
- Department of Migrant Workers

=== Quezon City ===
- EDSA Shrine
- Robinsons Galleria

=== Pasig ===
- Ortigas Building
- Meralco main office
  - Meralco Theater
- The Medical City Ortigas
  - Ateneo School of Medicine and Public Health
- Christ's Commission Fellowship
- Bridgetowne
- International Pipe Industries (IPI)
- Santo Rosario de Pasig Church
- SM City East Ortigas

=== Cainta ===
- Robinsons Cainta
- Primark Town Center Cainta

=== Taytay ===
- Kaytikling Rotunda

== See also ==
- List of roads in Metro Manila
