= Manila East Road =

Road in the Philippines

R-5 Manila East Road

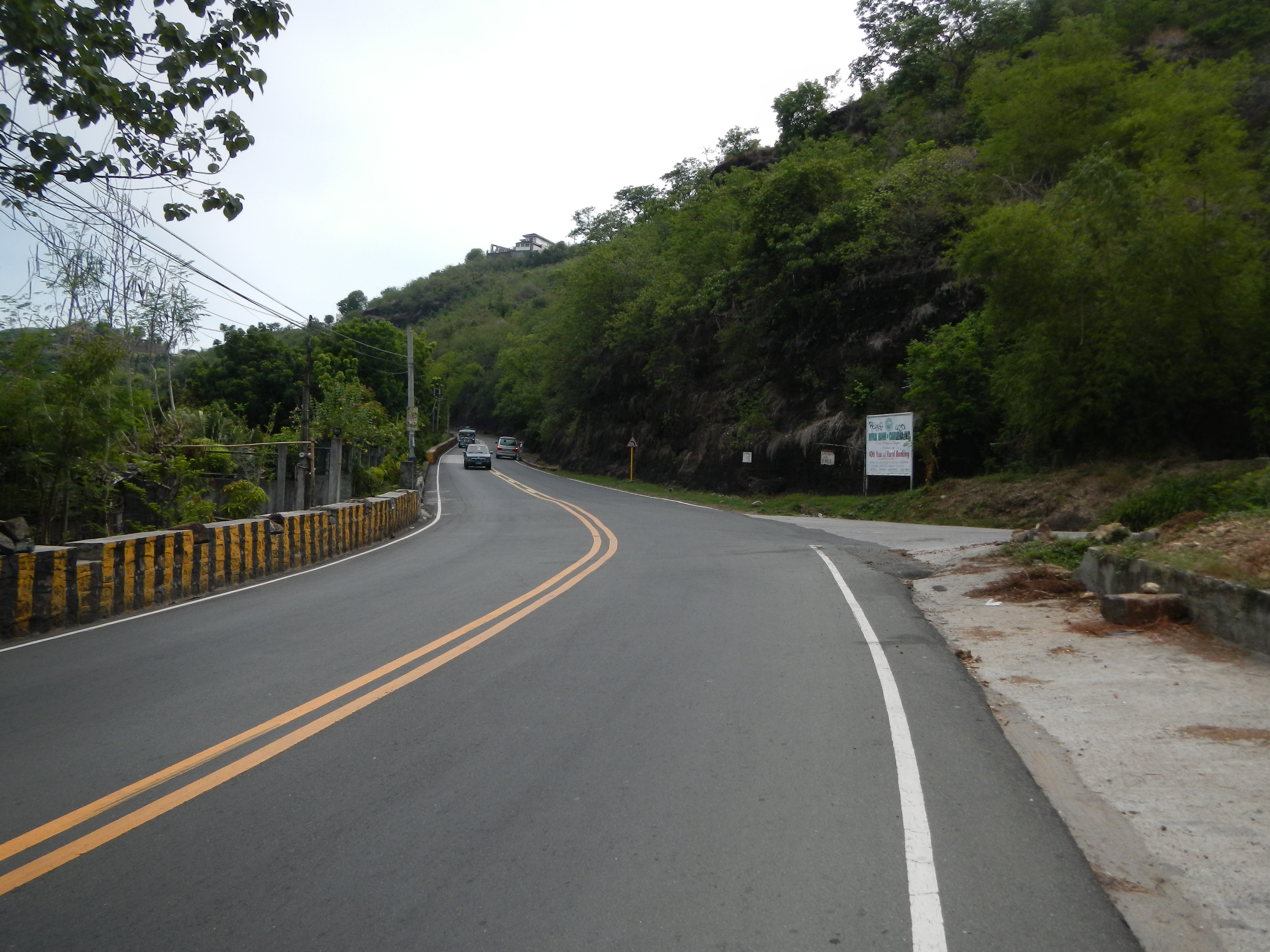
- Manila East Road in Cardona

Route information
- Maintained by Department of Public Works and Highways
- Length: 100.104 km (62.202 mi)
- Component highways: R-5 R-5; N60 in Pasig and Cainta; N601 from Cainta to Famy; N66 from Famy to Pagsanjan

Major junctions
- North end: N60 (Ortigas Avenue) / Dr. Sixto Antonio Avenue in Pasig
- N60 (Ortigas Avenue) / N601 (Felix Avenue) in Cainta; N60 (Taytay Diversion Road) in Taytay; N60 (Angono Diversion Road) / Don Mariano Santos Avenue in Angono; N60 (Angono Diversion Road) in Binangonan; N60 (Binangonan Diversion Road) in Binangonan; N60 (Sagbat–Pililla Diversion Road) in Morong; N60 (Sagbat–Pililla Diversion Road) in Pililla; N601 (Famy–Real–Infanta Road) in Famy
- South end: N66 (Calamba–Pagsanjan Road) / N603 (Pagsanjan–Lucban Road) in Pagsanjan

Location
- Country: Philippines
- Regions: Metro Manila and Calabarzon
- Provinces: Rizal and Laguna
- Major cities: Pasig
- Towns: Cainta, Taytay, Angono, Binangonan, Cardona, Morong, Baras, Tanay, Pililla, Mabitac, Famy, Siniloan, Pangil, Pakil, Paete, Kalayaan, Lumban, Pagsanjan

Highway system
- Roads in the Philippines; Highways; Expressways; List

The Manila East Road, also known as National Road and National Highway, is a two-to-four lane primary and secondary highway connecting Metro Manila to the provinces of Rizal and Laguna in the Philippines.

Since 2014, the entire road is a part of the series of national highways by the Department of Public Works and Highways. It is a component of National Route 60 from Pasig to Cainta, National Route 601 (N601) from Cainta to Famy, while the segment from Famy to Pagsanjan is a component of National Route 66 (N66).

== Route description ==
Manila East Road starts in barangay Rosario, Pasig as Ortigas Avenue at its intersection with Dr. Sixto Antonio Avenue. It then enters the province of Rizal at Cainta, where it turns south at Cainta Junction towards the poblacion. It enters Taytay, where it meets Taytay Diversion Road near the marketplace. It will then follow a route that circumscribes Laguna de Bay, passing through the coastal municipalities of Angono, Binangonan, Cardona, Morong, Baras, Tanay, and Pililla in Rizal. It then climbs through a mountainous terrain and enters the province of Laguna, traversing the municipalities of Mabitac, Famy, Siniloan, Pangil, Pakil, Paete, Kalayaan, Lumban, and Pagsanjan.

=== Alternative names ===
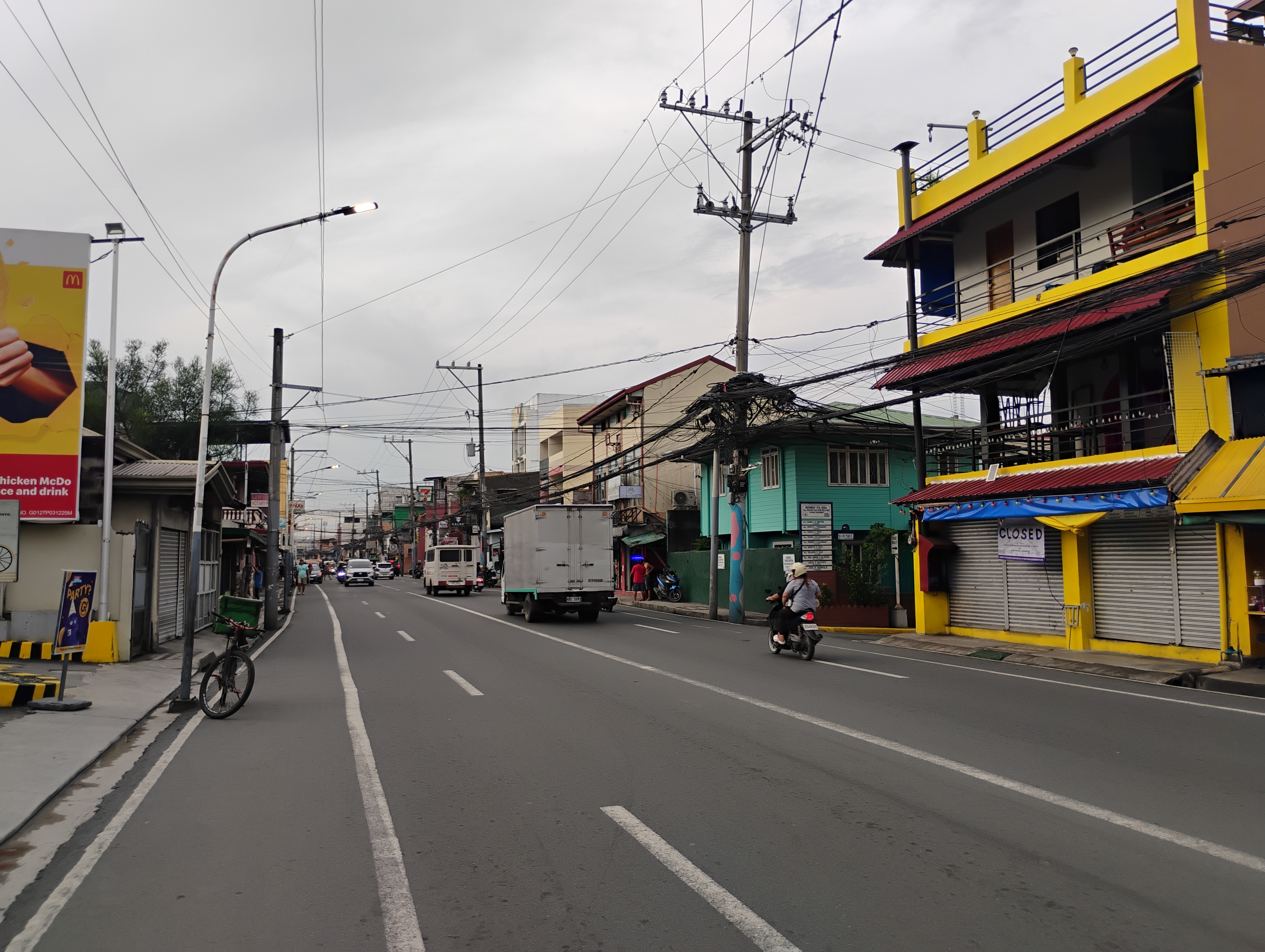
The road as Bonifacio Avenue in Cainta, Rizal

Manila East Road is also known as National Road or National Highway. Its section from Rosario, Pasig to Cainta Junction is also known as Rosario–Cainta Road and a part of Ortigas Avenue Extension, while its section from Tanay to Pililla is also known as Tanay–Pililla Road and its section from Mabitac to Famy is also known as Mabitac–Famy Road. Its section designated as N602, from Famy to Pagsanjan, forms part of Calamba–Santa Cruz–Famy Junction Road.

The highway is also locally known as the following within respective poblaciones:

- Bonifacio Avenue in Cainta
- Rizal Avenue in Taytay
- M.L. Quezon Avenue in Angono
- Baltazar Street and J.P. Rizal Avenue in Binangonan
- San Pedro Street and Rizal Street in Cardona
- T. Claudio Street in Baras
- J.P. Rizal Street in Baras and Pililla
- M.H. Del Pilar Street and F.T. Catapusan Street in Tanay
- G. Paz Street, M.L. Quezon Street, and M.A. Roxas Street in Pililla
- Gen. Taiño Street in Pagsanjan

== History ==
The highway used to start in or near Manila and took the present-day alignment of J.P. Rizal Avenue in Makati and Taguig (formerly part of Rizal), branching off from Santa Ana, Manila. Its alignment was later passed north of the Pasig River to the present-day P. Sanchez Street in Santa Mesa, Manila, and Shaw Boulevard from Mandaluyong to Pasig (the then-capital of Rizal). Both alignments also converged at the present-day Dr. Sixto Antonio Avenue in Pasig before meeting its present-day alignment along Ortigas Avenue up to Cainta. The highway was also designated as part of Highway 21 that linked the city of Manila with the provinces of Rizal and Laguna to the east, especially during the American colonial era. In the 1930s, its Laguna segment formed part of the Calamba–Santa Cruz–Rizal Boundary Road, while the rest of the section in Rizal was already officially known as the Manila East Road.

In 2025, the eastern section of the Manila East Road from Famy to Pagsanjan, initially N602, was upgraded from secondary to primary national road as part of N66. However, N602 still exists as a right-turn slot into the eastbound direction at the Famy Junction.

== Intersections ==
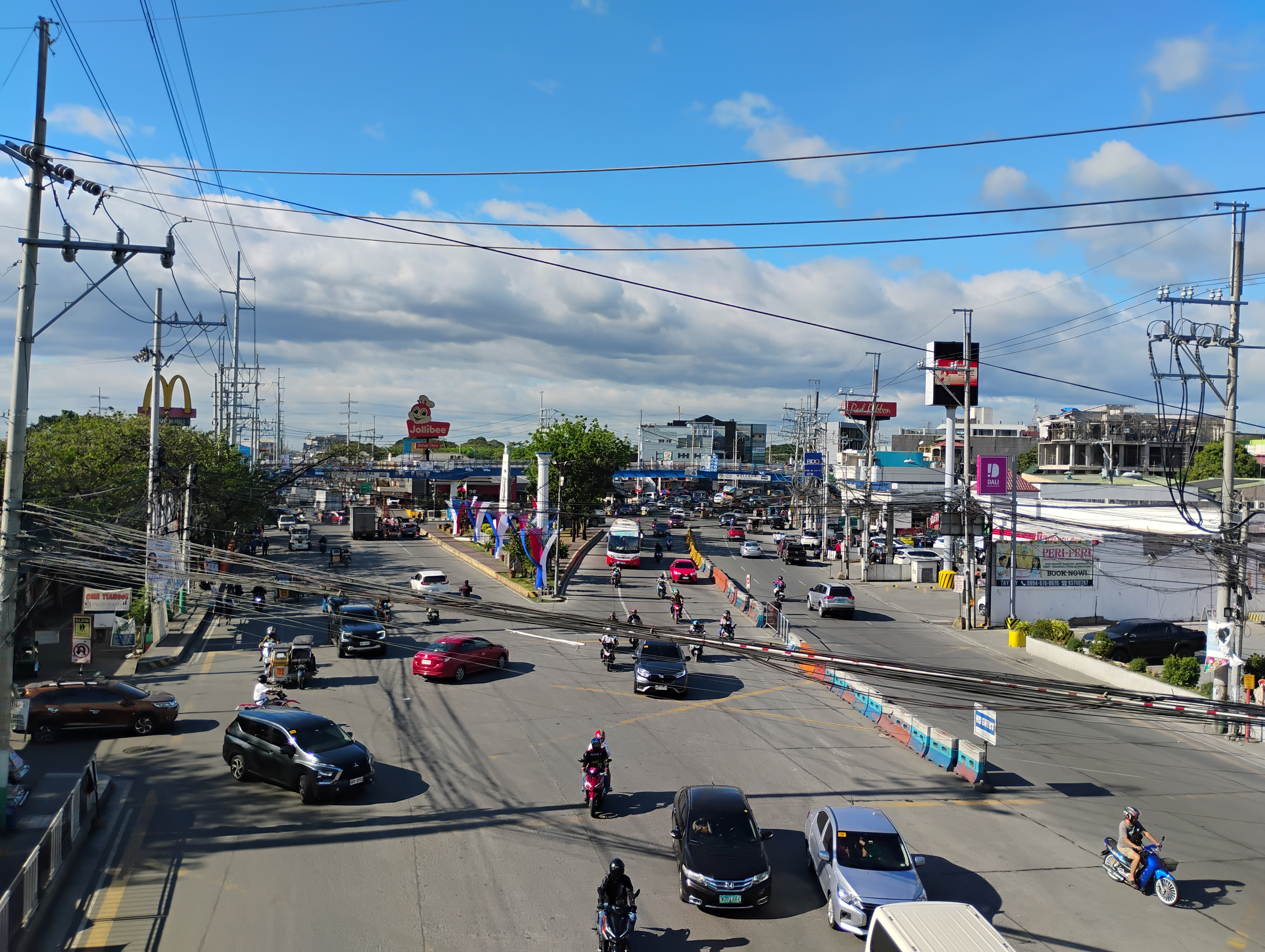
Taytay Triangle, the intersection of Manila East Road and Taytay Diversion Road in Taytay, Rizal

Province	City/Municipality	km	mi	Destinations	Notes
Pasig				N60 (Ortigas Avenue) / Dr. Sixto Antonio Avenue / ROTC Street — Mandaluyong, Quezon City, San Juan	Terminus. Continues westward as N60 (Ortigas Avenue).
Pasig				Eulogio Amang Rodriguez Avenue — Manggahan, Circulo Verde, Santolan	Right-in, right out. Left turns via U-turn slots. Alternate access to N59 (Marikina-Infanta Highway).
Pasig				Cipriano Raymundo Avenue — Maybunga, Bagong Ilog	Eastbound side only.
Rizal	Cainta			N60 (Ortigas Avenue Extension) / N601 (Felix Avenue) – Taytay, Marikina, Antipolo	Cainta Crossing. Traffic light intersection. Alternate access to N59 (Marikina-Infanta Highway). Road designation changes to N601 and follows Bonifacio Avenue into Taytay.
Rizal	Taytay			Gen. Artemio Ricarte Street / Rizal Avenue	Access to Ortigas Avenue Extension.
Rizal	Taytay			Pulumbarit Street	Access to Kaytikling Junction via Leonard Wood Street.
Rizal	Taytay			P. Ocampo Street	Access to Highway 2000 leading to Taguig & Pasig.
Rizal	Taytay			Taytay Market Road — Taguig, Pasig	Two one-way roads around the New Taytay Public Market. Access to Taguig & Pasig via Highway 2000 & Circumferential Road 6.
Rizal	Taytay			N601 (Taytay Diversion Road) – Antipolo	Taytay Triangle.
Rizal	Angono			N60 (Angono Diversion Road) / Don Mariano Santos Avenue	Northern end of diversion road. Access to Mahabang Parang in Angono and alternate access to Antipolo via DOMSA.
Rizal	Angono			Don Mariano Santos Avenue	
Rizal	Angono			Colonel Guido Street	Access to Mahabang Parang & Angono poblacion.
Rizal	Angono			N60 (Angono Diversion Road)	Southern end of diversion road.
Rizal	Binangonan			Quarry Road	Internal road leading to Barangays Pantok & Palangoy and Mahabang Parang in Angono.
Rizal	Binangonan			Binangonan–Angono–Taytay Coastal Road	Under construction.
Rizal	Binangonan			N60 (Binangonan Diversion Road)	Western end of diversion road.
Rizal	Binangonan			Osmeña Street / Baltazar Street	Continues through the town as Baltazar Street.
Rizal	Binangonan			J.P. Rizal Avenue	
Rizal	Binangonan			N60 (Binangonan Diversion Road)	Eastern end of diversion road.
Rizal	Cardona			Cardona Diversion Road	South end of the diversion road.
Rizal	Cardona			Rizal Street / San Pedro Street / Pasay Street	Cardona poblacion. All roads are one-way segments due to the width of the road.
Rizal	Cardona			Cardona Diversion Road	North end of the diversion road.
Rizal	Morong			Corazon C. Aquino Avenue — Antipolo, Teresa	Eastern end of Corazon Aquino Avenue.
Rizal	Morong			N60 (Sagbat–Pililla Diversion Road) – Baras, Tanay, Pililla	Western end of diversion road. Road continues as T. Claudio Street.
Rizal	Morong			H. Raymundo Street	Brgy. Lagundi internal road leading to Pinugay in Baras. Road continues into Baras poblacion as J.P. Rizal Avenue.
Rizal	Baras			Bayani–Ferrera Road (Alejo Street)	Internal road leading to Brgy. Pinugay in Baras.
Rizal	Tanay			Tanay–Sampaloc Road — Tanay, Santa Maria	Tanay poblacion. Access to N59 (Marikina-Infanta Highway).
Rizal	Pililla			N60 (Sagbat–Pililla Diversion Road) – Tanay, Pililla	Pililla poblacion. Eastern end of diversion road.
Rizal	Pililla			Pililla–Jala-Jala–Pakil Road	Access to the municipalities of Jalajala and Pakil.
Laguna	Mabitac			J.P. Rizal Street — Mabitac, Santa Maria	Northbound leads to Santa Maria poblacion; southbound to Mabitac poblacion.
Laguna	Mabitac			Santa Maria Diversion Road — Real, Infanta	Access to N59 (Marikina-Infanta Highway).
Laguna	Famy			N601 (Famy–Real–Infanta Road) / Paete-Famy Poblacion Road – Siniloan, Infanta, Paete	Famy Junction. Road designation changes to N66.
Laguna	Famy			N602	Eastbound entrance only. Part of Famy Junction.
Laguna	Siniloan			Q. Dela Rosa Street	Access to Siniloan poblacion.
Laguna	Pakil			Pakil–Pangil–Mabitac Road — Siniloan, Pakil	
Laguna	Pakil			Tavera Street — Pakil, Paete	
Laguna	Paete			J.V. Quesada Street	Paete poblacion internal road.
Laguna	Paete			J.P. Rizal Street	
Laguna	Kalayaan			Longos–San Antonio Road	Internal road leading to Brgy. San Antonio in Kalayaan.
Laguna	Kalayaan			Kalayaan Poblacion Road	Road to Brgy. San Juan (Kalayaan poblacion).
Laguna	Lumban			Lagumbay Road	Internal road to Lumban poblacion.
Laguna	Lumban			Lumban–Caliraya–Cavinti Road — Lake Caliraya, Lumot Lake, Cavinti	
Laguna	Pagsanjan			N66 (Calamba–Pagsanjan Road) / N603 (Pagsanjan–Lucban Road) – Calamba, Batangas, Quezon	Terminus. Pagsanjan segment locally known as General Taino Street.
1.000 mi = 1.609 km; 1.000 km = 0.621 mi: Incomplete access; Route transition; Unopened

== Landmarks ==
This is from its western end in Pasig to the eastern end in Pagsanjan.

Pasig

- Santo Rosario de Pasig Church
- Ortigas Bridge (Manggahan Floodway)
- SM City East Ortigas
- Cainta-Buli Bridge (Buli Creek)

Cainta, Rizal

- Cainta Brookside Bridge (Cainta River)
- Mapindan Bridge (Mapindan River)
- Primark Town Center

Taytay, Rizal

- Kaytikling Rotonda
- SM City Taytay
- Veterans Memorial Park (Taytay Triangle)
- National College of Business and Arts

Angono, Rizal

- SM Center Angono
- Angono 2 Bridge (Angono River)

Binangonan, Rizal

- Binangonan Public Market
- Darangan Bridge
- University of Rizal System Binangonan campus

Cardona, Rizal

- Cardona Church
- Cardona Municipal Hall

Morong, Rizal

- Morong Bridge (Morong River)
- Namay Bridge
- Rizal Provincial Hospital
- Morong Municipal Cemetery

Baras, Rizal

- Baras New Public Market
- Baras Bridge (Baras River)

Tanay, Rizal

- Tanay Bridge (Tanay River)

Pililla, Rizal

- Pililia Bridge I (Pililia River)
- Pililia Veterans Park

Mabitac, Laguna

- Paaghan Bridge
- Mabitac Municipal Hall
- Mayputat Bridge

Famy, Laguna

- Famy World War II Veterans Monument
- Liavak Bridge

Siniloan, Laguna

- Siniloan Bridge (Siniloan River)

Pangil, Laguna

- Pangil Bridge 1 (Pangil River)

Pakil, Laguna

- Pakil Bridge

Paete, Laguna

- Paete Town Bridge

Kalayaan, Laguna

- Longos Bridge
- Kalayaan Bridge
- Kalayaan Church

Lumban, Laguna

- Lumban Bridge (Pagsanjan River)
- Balanac Bridge (Pagsanjan River)

Pagsanjan, Laguna

- Pagsanjan Church
- Pagsanjan Town Plaza
- Liceo de Pagsanjan
