= Circumferential Road 5–Ortigas Avenue Interchange =

Junction in the Philippines

- C-5–Ortigas Interchange
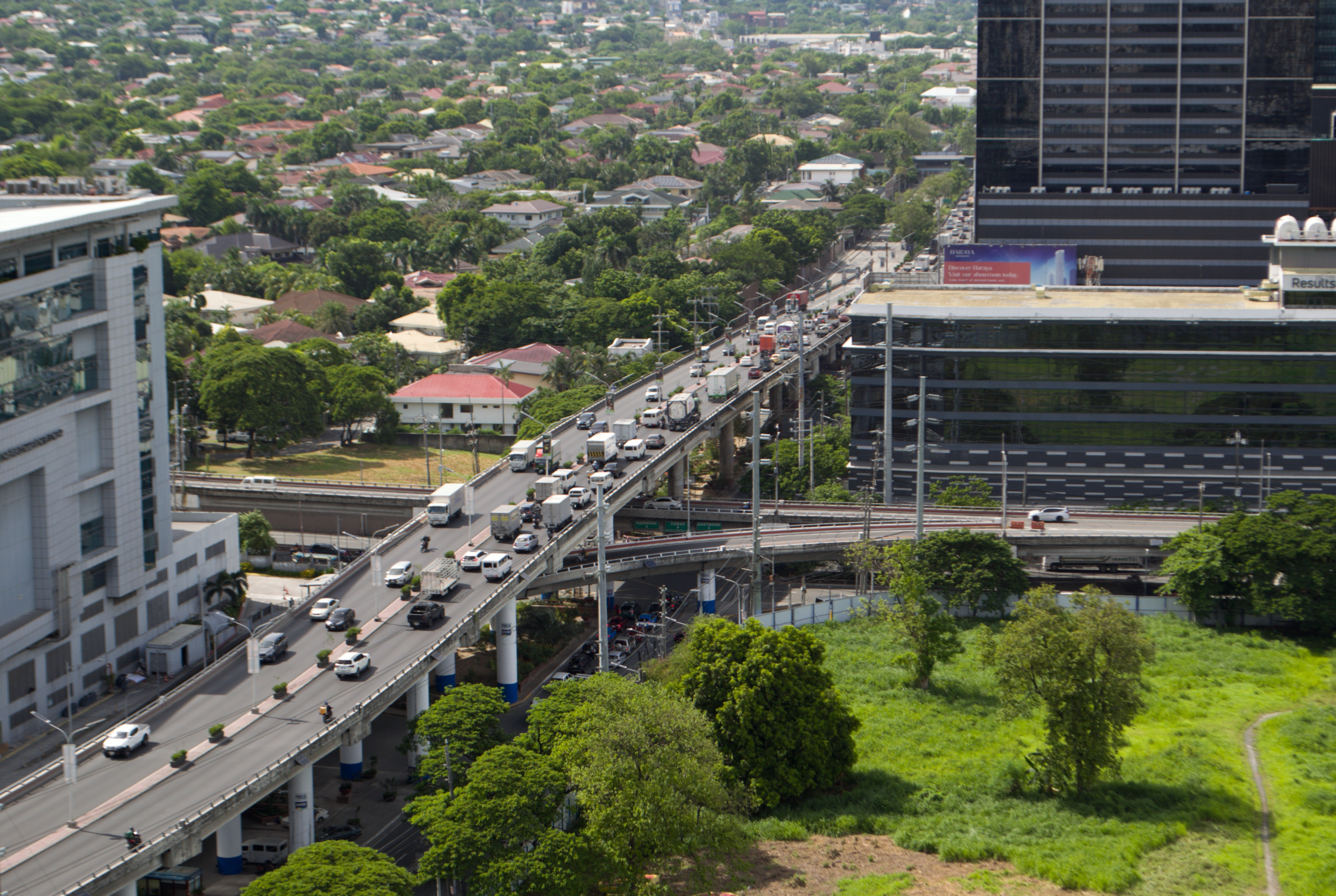
- The interchange in 2024

Location
- Ugong, Pasig, Metro Manila, Philippines
- Coordinates: 14°35′23.11″N 121°4′47.84″E
- Roads at junction: N11 (Circumferential Road 5); N60 (Ortigas Avenue)

Construction
- Type: Three-level set of intersecting flyovers
- Constructed: 2001–2004 by F.F. Cruz and Company
- Opened: December 23, 2003
- Maintained by: Department of Public Works and Highways

The Circumferential Road 5–Ortigas Avenue Interchange, also known as the C-5–Ortigas Interchange, is a pair of intersecting flyovers in Pasig, Metro Manila, Philippines that serves as the junction between Circumferential Road 5 (C-5) and Ortigas Avenue. Originally a regular four-way intersection, the current interchange was inaugurated in 2003 and completed in 2004.

== History and technical specifications ==
The C-5–Ortigas Interchange consists of two flyovers: a three-level, four-lane, 694-meter-long (2,277 ft) flyover along Circumferential Road 5, particularly Eulogio Rodriguez Jr. Avenue, and a two-level, two-lane, 232-meter-long (761 ft) left-turn flyover along Ortigas Avenue which would allow for the grade separation of traffic coming from eastern Metro Manila towards C-5 southbound. Another two-lane, 427-meter (1,401 ft) flyover along Ortigas Avenue was also supposed to be constructed as part of the project but was ultimately excluded by the Department of Public Works and Highways.

Construction of the interchange began in January 2001, led by the Sumitomo Corporation, with the work being contracted out to F.F. Cruz and Company, one of the Philippines' largest construction companies. The interchange was finally completed in March 2004, although it was inaugurated on December 23, 2003, by then-Metropolitan Manila Development Authority (MMDA) chairman Bayani Fernando.

=== Cost overruns ===
Construction of the C-5–Ortigas Interchange was marred by cost overruns and accusations of overpricing by the contractor, Sumitomo. Columnist Federico Pascual, Jr. claimed in the Philippine Star that bidding for the interchange project was rigged in favor of Sumitomo, despite submitting a bid 28% above the mandated project price of ₱770 million. Ultimately, the interchange project that the C-5–Ortigas Interchange was a part of was ₱1 billion over budget.

== See also ==
- Circumferential Road 5
- Ortigas Avenue
- EDSA–Ortigas Interchange
- Media related to Circumferential Road 5–Ortigas Avenue at Wikimedia Commons
