= Famy =

Municipality in Laguna, Philippines

- Municipality
- Municipality of Famy
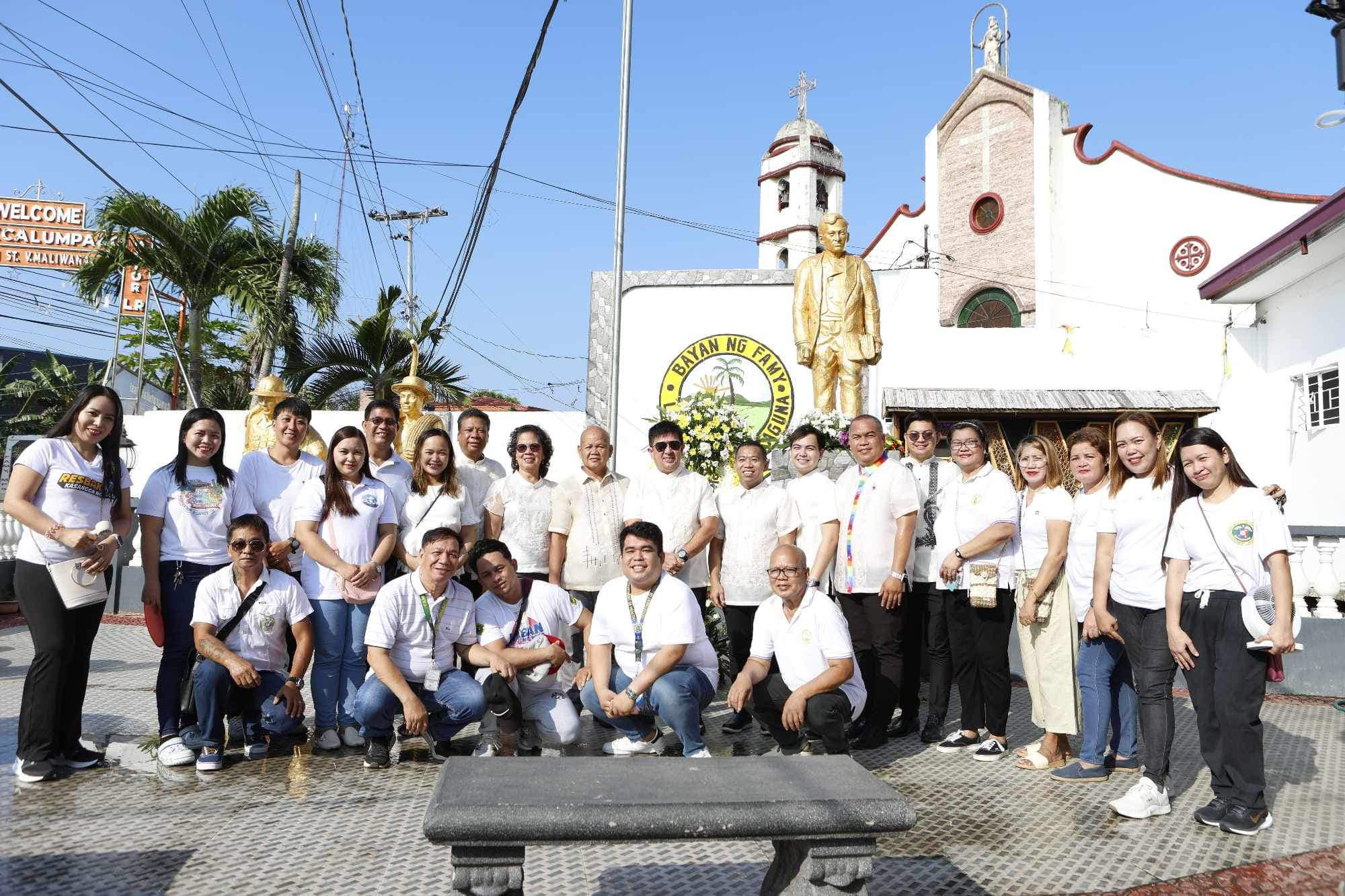
- Famy Park

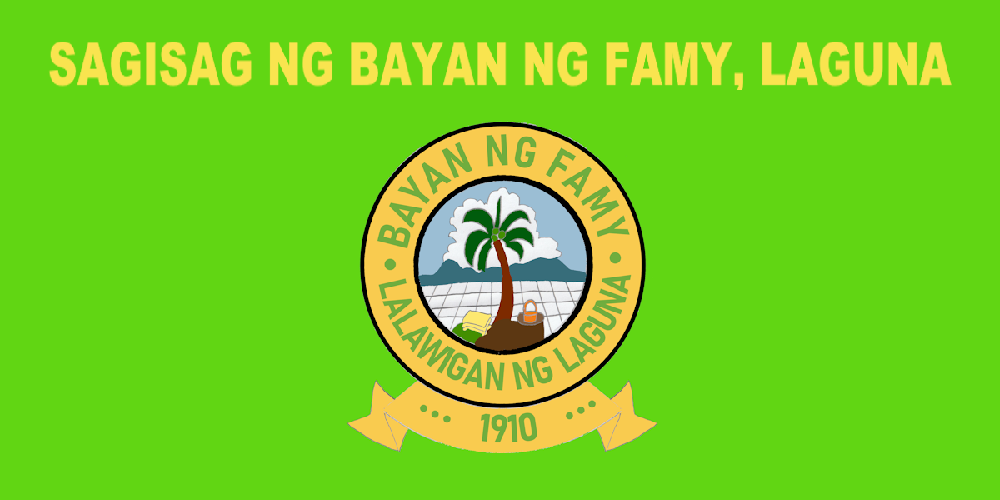
- Flag Seal
- Nickname: Home of Bamboo Weavers
- Motto: Bang Gara Aba!
- Anthem: Himno ng Famy & Martsa ng Bayan ng Famy
- Map of Laguna with Famy highlighted
- Interactive map of Famy
- Location within the Philippines
- Coordinates: 14°26′N 121°27′E
- Country: Philippines
- Region: Calabarzon
- Province: Laguna
- District: 4th district
- First settlements established: 1612
- Annexation to Siniloan: October 12, 1903
- Founded: August 15, 1910
- Named for: Trinidad Aguinaldo y Famy
- Barangays: 20 (see Barangays)

Government
  - Type: Sangguniang Bayan
  - Mayor: Lorenzo B. Rellosa
  - Vice Mayor: Wilfredo M. Valois
  - Representative: Benjamin C. Agarao Jr.
  - Municipal Council: Members: Ezekiel A. Pangilinan; Emmanuel L. Valois; Amador A. Acomular; Roelito V. Orozco; Ashley V. Fernandez; Ernesto A. Sibayan Jr.; Charmaine D. Acomular; Elijah P. Gabriel
  - Electorate: 14,985 voters (2025)

Area
  - Total: 53.06 km^{2} (20.49 sq mi)
- Elevation: 265 m (869 ft)
- Highest elevation: 835 m (2,740 ft)
- Lowest elevation: 1 m (3.3 ft)

Population (2024 census)
  - Total: 17,668
  - Density: 333.0/km^{2} (862.4/sq mi)
  - Households: 4,189

Economy
  - Income class: 4th municipal income class
  - Poverty incidence: 14.27% (2023)
  - Revenue: ₱ 112.2 million (2024)
  - Assets: ₱ 279.4 million (2024)
  - Expenditure: ₱ 51.44 million (2024)
  - Liabilities: ₱ 130.8 million (2024)

Service provider
  - Electricity: First Laguna Electric Cooperative (FLECO)
- Time zone: UTC+8 (PST)
- ZIP code: 4021
- PSGC: 0403408000
- IDD : area code: +63 (0)49
- Native languages: Tagalog
- Patron saint: Saint Sebastian
- Website: www.famylaguna.gov.ph

Famy, officially the Municipality of Famy (Tagalog: Bayan ng Famy), is a municipality in the province of Laguna, Philippines. According to the 2024 census, it has a population of 17,668 people, making it the least populated municipality in the province.

== Etymology ==
The area now known as Famy was originally a barrio called Calumpang, under the jurisdiction of the municipality of Siniloan. When it was separated and established as an independent municipality, it was renamed Famy in honor of Trinidad Famy y Villanueva, the mother of General Emilio Aguinaldo.

== History ==
The history of the town as a barrio of Siniloan dates back to 1612 when its natural resources were first exploited by home seekers from Daraitan in Tanay. These home seekers named the place Calumpang, after a big shady Calumpang tree that grows in the heart of the place.

Year after year, the inhabitants of the place increased. People from nearby towns were attracted to the barrio because of the vast area of uncultivated lands. They succeeded in making the lands suitable for food crops. They especially made use of the lowlands where more of the inhabitants settled. Home industries gained interest among women. Spiny bamboos were planted as raw materials for the basket industry that remain an important industry in the present.

In 1835, when the people realized the changes of the place, from the bedlam of wilderness to a barrio worthy of becoming a town, they for the first time, sought to become a municipality with its own government. The plan was rejected because of the meager population of the barrio. Again the prominent men of the barrio tried to secure the separation. Stimulated by the feeling of patriotism, men from the barrio voluntarily presented themselves as revolutionist claiming that they will fight on the side of General Emilio Aguinaldo if he will help make the barrio a town. After the revolution, Aguinaldo ordered that Calumpang be separated from Siniloan. Barrio Calumpang was then renamed Famy. This was in memory of Aguinaldo's mother, Trinidad Aguinaldo y Famy.

When the Americans took possession of the Philippines, the form of government automatically changed. With an Executive Order, small towns became barrios of nearby towns. Famy was affected by this order, and again became a barrio of Siniloan in 1903. In spite of these changes the people continued the development of the barrio. They tried their best to increase the area of cultivated lands. The inhabitants of this municipality were not satisfied of being a barrio again of Siniloan, so they filed a request to the Governor General that Famy be a town again, citing that no salary for services rendered will be asked and that the municipal hall and school buildings shall be constructed, all on the help of the town's people. By virtue of this request, the Governor General issued Executive Order No. 60 series of 1910, separating Famy from Siniloan. This order took effect on August 15, 1910.

== Geography ==
Famy lies in the north-eastern part of the province of Laguna via Manila East Road. It is bounded by Siniloan to the east and south, Santa Maria to the north, Mabitac and Santa Maria to the west. It is 27 kilometers (17 mi) from the provincial capital, Santa Cruz, 79 kilometers (49 mi) from Manila, and 75 kilometers (47 mi) from Lucena.

=== Barangays ===
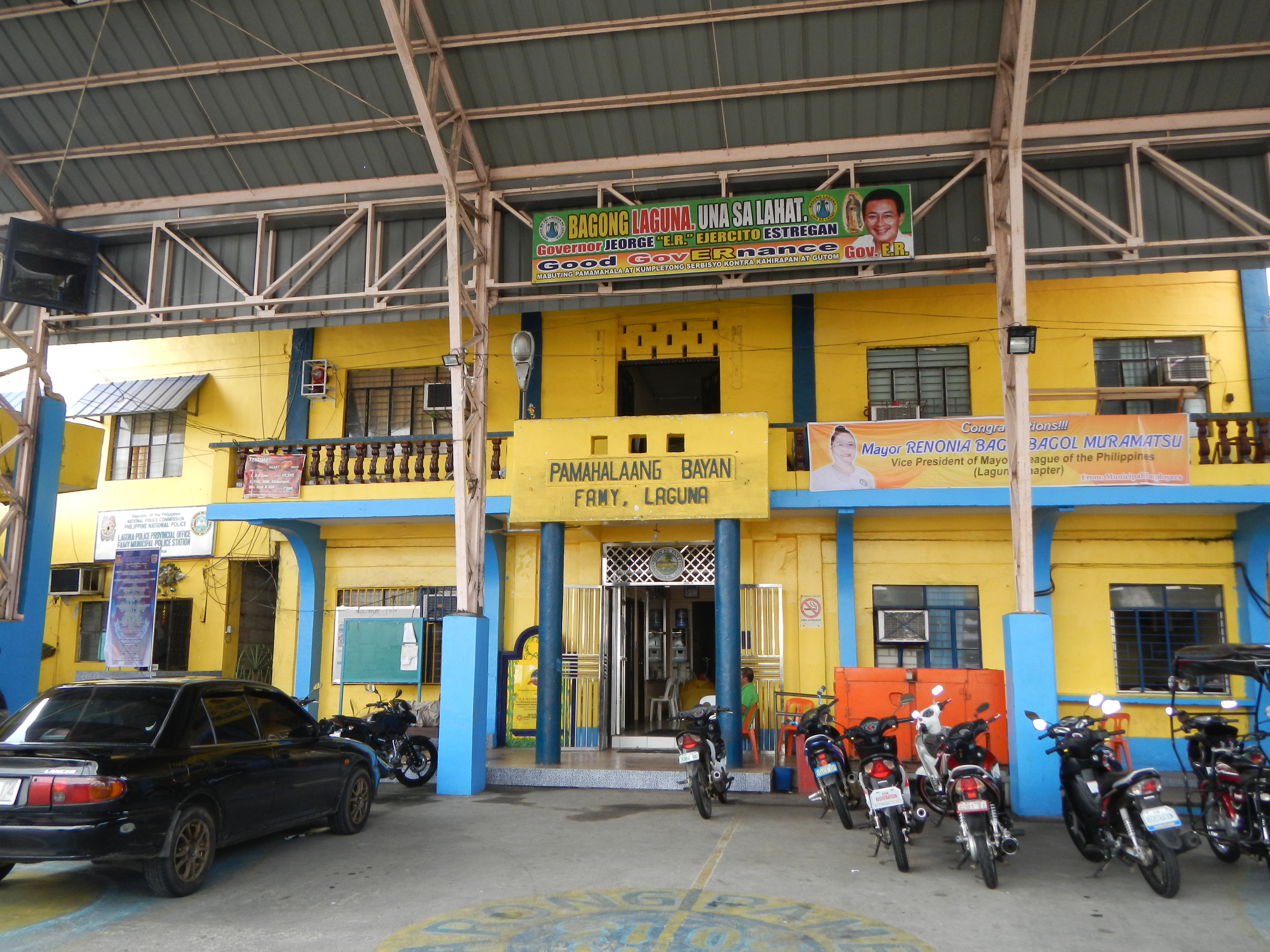
Famy town hall

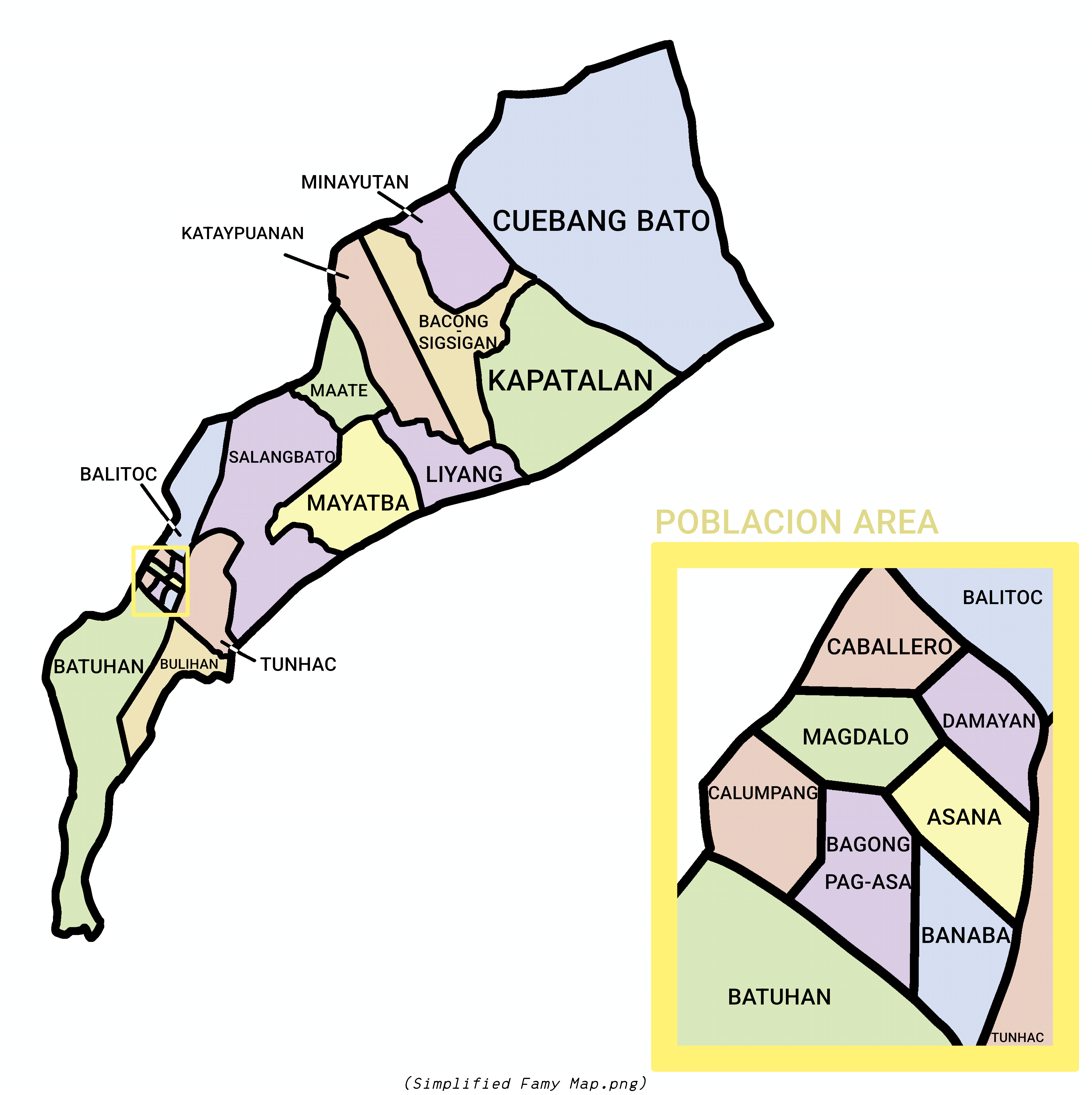
Barangay Map of Famy

Famy is politically subdivided into 20 barangays, as indicated below. Each barangay consists of puroks and some have sitios.

- Asana (Poblacion)
- Bacong-Sigsigan
- Bagong Pag-Asa (Poblacion)
- Balitoc
- Banaba (Poblacion)
- Batuhan
- Bulihan
- Caballero (Poblacion)
- Calumpang (Poblacion)
- Kapatalan
- Cuebang Bato
- Damayan (Poblacion)
- Kataypuanan
- Liyang
- Maate
- Magdalo (Poblacion)
- Mayatba
- Minayutan
- Salangbato
- Tunhac

=== Climate ===
Climate data for Famy, Laguna
Month	Jan	Feb	Mar	Apr	May	Jun	Jul	Aug	Sep	Oct	Nov	Dec	Year
Mean daily maximum °C (°F)	26 (79)	27 (81)	29 (84)	31 (88)	31 (88)	30 (86)	29 (84)	29 (84)	29 (84)	29 (84)	28 (82)	26 (79)	29 (84)
Mean daily minimum °C (°F)	22 (72)	22 (72)	22 (72)	23 (73)	24 (75)	25 (77)	24 (75)	24 (75)	24 (75)	24 (75)	24 (75)	23 (73)	23 (74)
Average precipitation mm (inches)	58 (2.3)	41 (1.6)	32 (1.3)	29 (1.1)	91 (3.6)	143 (5.6)	181 (7.1)	162 (6.4)	172 (6.8)	164 (6.5)	113 (4.4)	121 (4.8)	1,307 (51.5)
Average rainy days	13.4	9.3	9.1	9.8	19.1	22.9	26.6	24.9	25.0	21.4	16.5	16.5	214.5
Source: Meteoblue

== Demographics ==
Population census of Famy
Year	Pop.	±% p.a.
1903	1,262	—
1918	1,095	−0.94%
1939	1,547	+1.66%
1948	1,569	+0.16%
1960	4,163	+8.47%
1970	4,651	+1.11%
1975	5,222	+2.35%
1980	5,241	+0.07%
1990	7,928	+4.23%
1995	9,661	+3.77%
2000	10,419	+1.63%
2007	13,577	+3.72%
2010	15,021	+3.75%
2015	16,587	+1.91%
2020	16,791	+0.26%
2024	17,668	+1.23%
Source: Philippine Statistics Authority

In the 2024 census, the population of Famy, Laguna, was 17,668 people, with a density of 330 inhabitants per square kilometre or 850 inhabitants per square mile.

== Economy ==
Poverty incidence of Famy (%)

Source: Philippine Statistics Authority

== Transportation ==
=== Bus route ===
- MRR Transport Inc & Raymond Transportation Inc (Manila Sampaloc/Legarda Via Antipolo Famy-Real-Infanta Road) local only.

== Education ==
The Famy-Mabitac Schools District Office governs all educational institutions within the municipality. It oversees the management and operations of all private and public, from primary to secondary schools.

=== Primary and elementary schools ===
- Famy Elementary School
- Mayatba Elementary School
- Minayutan Elementary School
- Sahur-Ulan Elementary School
- San Miguel Elementary School

=== Secondary schools ===
- Famy National Integrated High School
- Famy National Integrated High School - Mayatba Extension
