= Calamba–Pagsanjan Road =

Primary highway in Laguna, Philippines

Calamba–Pagsanjan Road
- National Highway
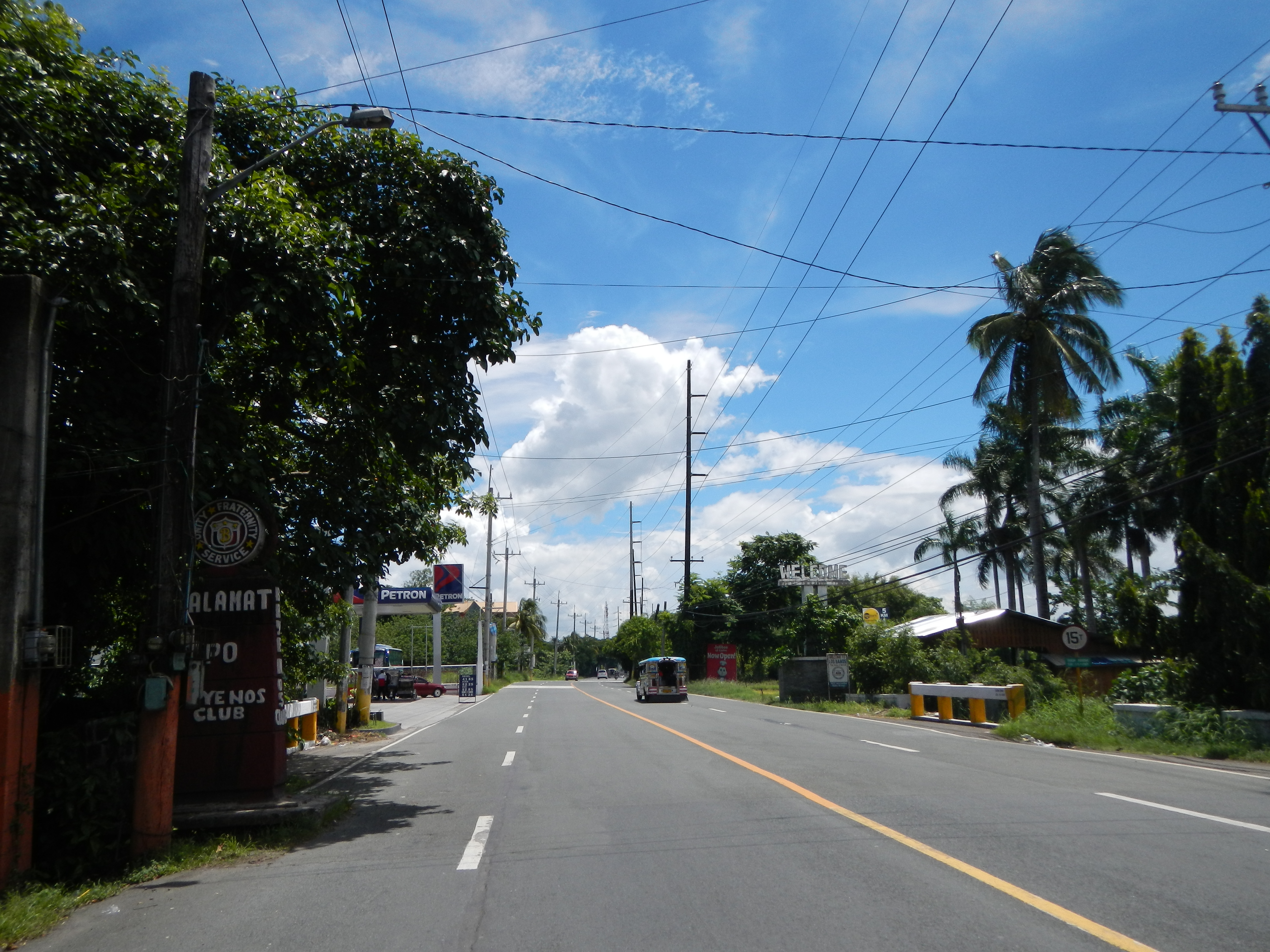
- Calamba–Pagsanjan Road in Los Baños, Laguna

Route information
- Maintained by Department of Public Works and Highways
- Length: 40.762 km (25.328 mi)
- Component highways: N66

Major junctions
- West end: N1 (Manila South Road) in Calamba
- N67 (Calauan–Victoria Road) in Victoria
- East end: N66 (Manila East Road) / N603 (Pagsanjan–Cavinti Road) in Pagsanjan

Location
- Country: Philippines
- Provinces: Laguna
- Major cities: Calamba
- Towns: Los Baños, Bay, Calauan, Victoria, Pila, Santa Cruz, Pagsanjan

Highway system
- Roads in the Philippines; Highways; Expressways; List
← N65	→ N67

The Calamba–Pagsanjan Road, officially known as Calamba–Sta. Cruz–Famy Junction Road, Manila South Road, and National Highway, is a two-to-four lane primary highway located in the province of Laguna in the Philippines.

The entire road is designated as National Route 66 (N66), a national primary route of the Philippine highway network.

== Route description ==
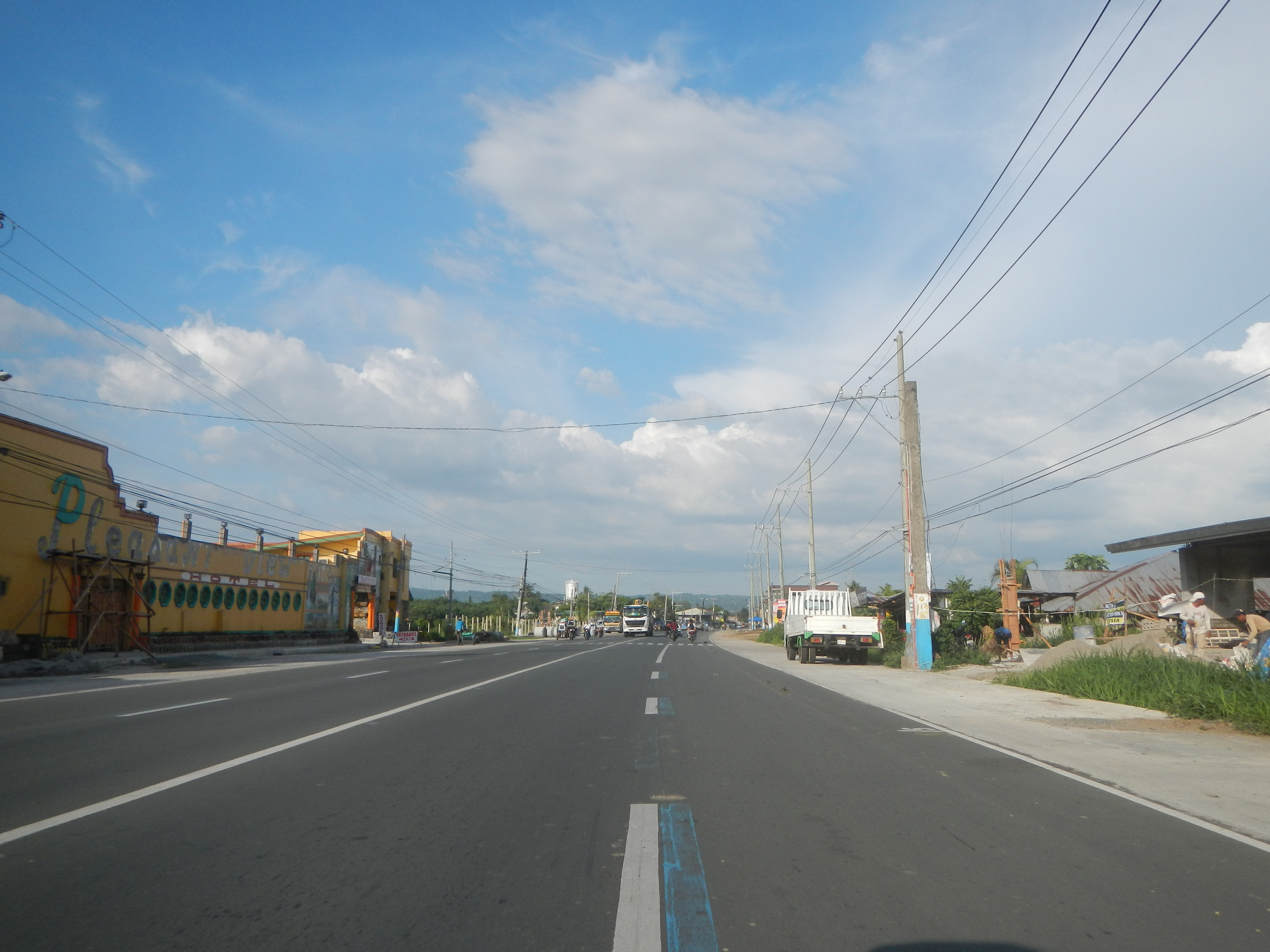
The road eastbound in Santa Cruz, Laguna

It starts from the intersection of the Old National Highway (Manila South Road) at the Calamba Crossing in Calamba, where it briefly carries one-way northbound traffic. It then follows a route that circumscribes Laguna de Bay, passing through the municipalities of Los Baños, Bay, Calauan, Victoria, Pila, Santa Cruz, the capital of Laguna, and terminates in Pagsanjan, all in Laguna.

=== Alternative names ===
The highway is also known as National Highway or Manila South Road (Extension) for being such. It forms part of the Calamba to Pagsanjan segment of the Calamba–Sta. Cruz–Famy Junction Road. Its section in Calauan and Victoria is also known as Masapang Highway (misspelled or also known as Maspang Highway), apparently after the barangay of the same name in Victoria where its eastern end is located. At the town proper of Pagsanjan, it is locally known as J.P. Rizal Street or simply as Rizal Street.

== History ==
Most of the highway existed back to the American colonial era as part of Highway 21 that linked the city of Manila to the provinces of Rizal and Laguna by circumscribing Laguna de Bay. The Calamba–Calauan segment of the highway was part of the Manila South Road system prior to the completion of the present-day section of the Pan-Philippine Highway from Santo Tomas, Batangas to San Pablo, Laguna during that era. The entire road formed part of what was known as the Calamba–Santa Cruz–Rizal Boundary Road. Roads bypassing the poblaciones of Santa Cruz, Calauan, and Bay were later built to form the present-day highway alignment.

As of 2026, the Department of Public Works and Highways (DPWH) revised the western terminus of the Calamba–Pagsanjan Road from its junction with J.P. Rizal Street and Real Road (officially known as Rizal Shrine Road) to its intersection with Manila South Road, both at the Calamba Crossing, incorporating a segment of the latter into its alignment.

== Intersections ==
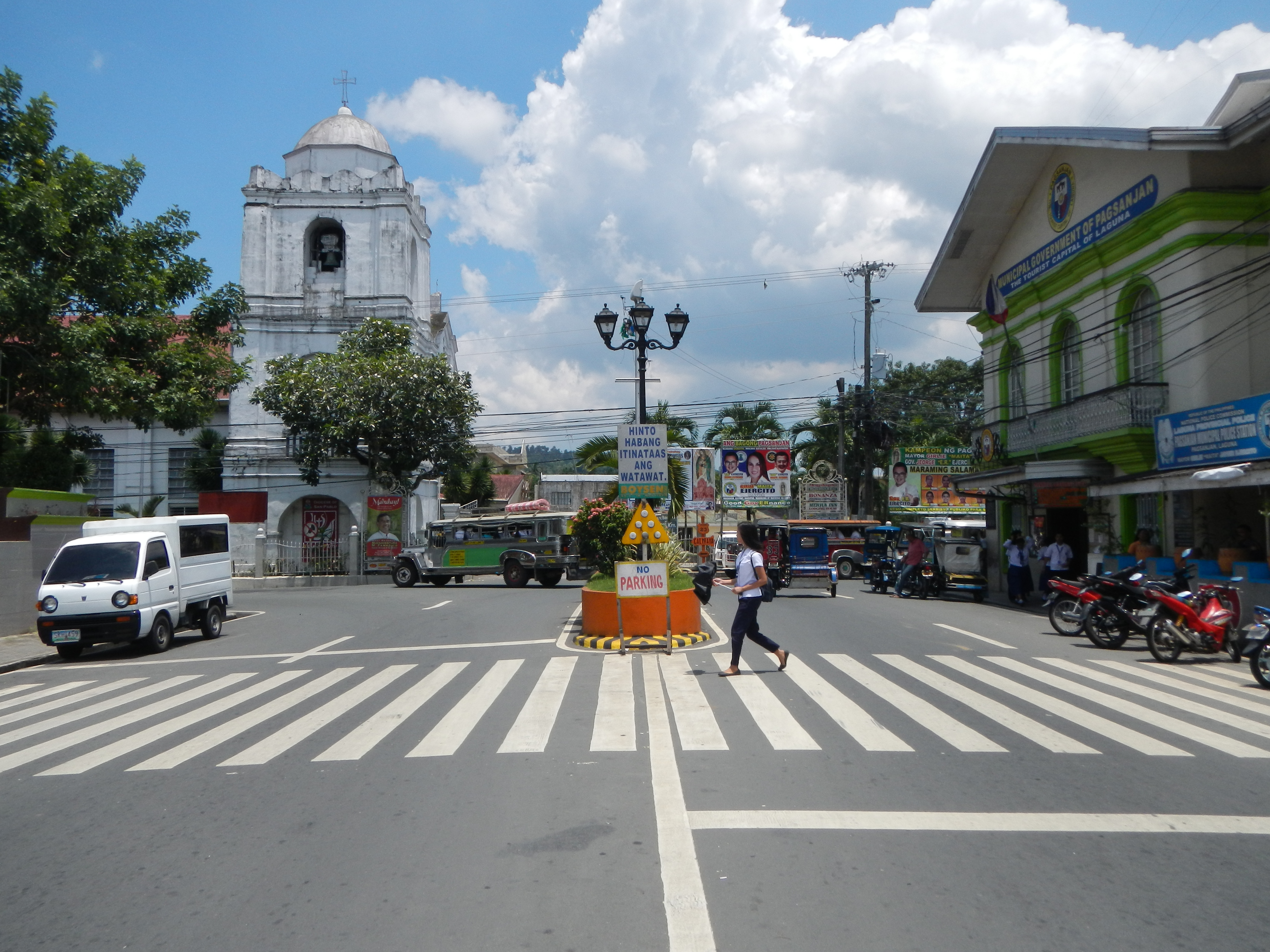
The road's eastern terminus in Pagsanjan, Laguna

The entire route is located in Laguna. Intersections are numbered by kilometer posts, with Rizal Park in Manila designated as kilometer zero.

City/Municipality	km	mi	Destinations	Notes
Calamba	50.9	31.6	N1 (Manila South Road)	Western terminus
Calamba	51.1	31.8	N420-2 (Real Road / J.P. Rizal Street)	Traffic light intersection. Access to Rizal Shrine and old Calamba City proper.
Calamba	55.4	34.4	Milagrosa–Bucal Bypass Road	Traffic light intersection
Los Baños	61.8	38.4	N420-3 (Jamboree Road)	
Los Baños	64.3	40.0	N420-3 (Lopez Avenue) / Junction Road	
Bay	67.8	42.1	Bay Poblacion Road	
Bay	68.3	42.4	F.T. San Luis Avenue	
Bay–Calauan	69.4	43.1	Bay–Calauan Road / Bay Poblacion Road	Traffic light intersection
Victoria–Calauan	74.9	46.5	N67 (Calauan–Victoria Road)	Itik Park
Pila	80.8	50.2	Rizal Street / Pila-Calumpang Road	
Pila	82.2	51.1	General Luna Street (Pila-Poblacion Road)	
Santa Cruz	86.4	53.7	N602-1 (Quezon Avenue) / Calumpang-Santa Cruz Road	
Santa Cruz	89.7	55.7	N602-1 (Pedro Guevarra Avenue)	
Pagsanjan	93.4	58.0	N66 / N603 (Gen. Taiño Street)	Eastern terminus
1.000 mi = 1.609 km; 1.000 km = 0.621 mi
