= Ortigas Interchange =

Road interchange in Metro Manila, Philippines

- EDSA–Ortigas Interchange; Ortigas Flyover
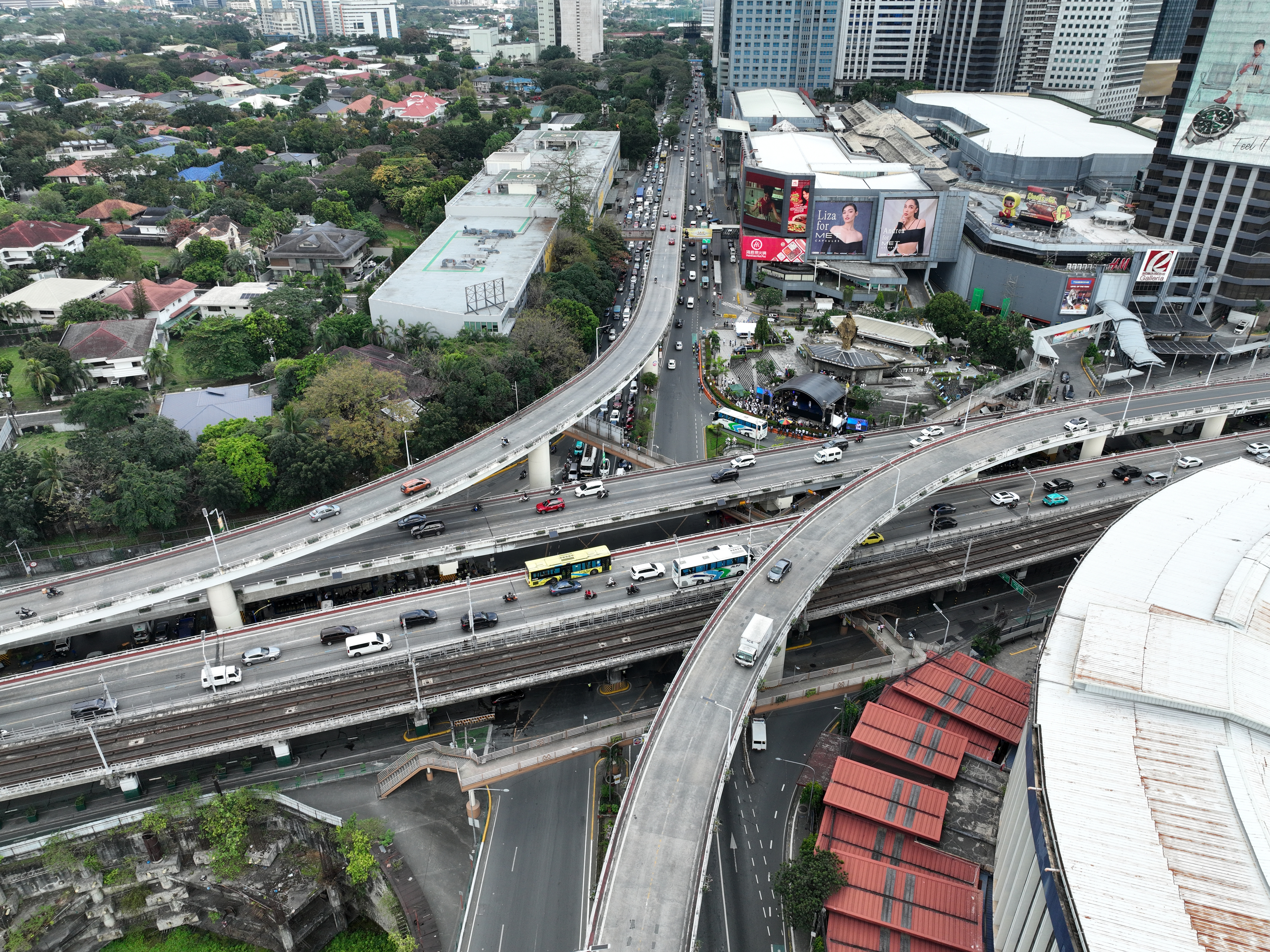
- Aerial view of the Ortigas Interchange facing south (2026)
- Interactive map of Ortigas Interchange

Location
- Mandaluyong and Quezon City, Metro Manila, Philippines
- Coordinates: 14°35′35.36″N 121°3′30.44″E
- Roads at junction: AH 26 (N1) (Epifanio de los Santos Avenue); N60 / N184 (Ortigas Avenue)

Construction
- Type: Three-level partial stack interchange
- Opened: December 23, 1991
- Maintained by: Department of Public Works and Highways

The Ortigas Interchange, also known as the EDSA–Ortigas Interchange or the Ortigas Flyover, is a three-level partial stack interchange at the boundary between Mandaluyong and Quezon City in Metro Manila, Philippines, which serves as the junction between Epifanio de los Santos Avenue (EDSA) and Ortigas Avenue. Originally a regular four-way intersection, the current interchange was built in 1991 as the flagship infrastructure project of President Corazon Aquino.

== History ==
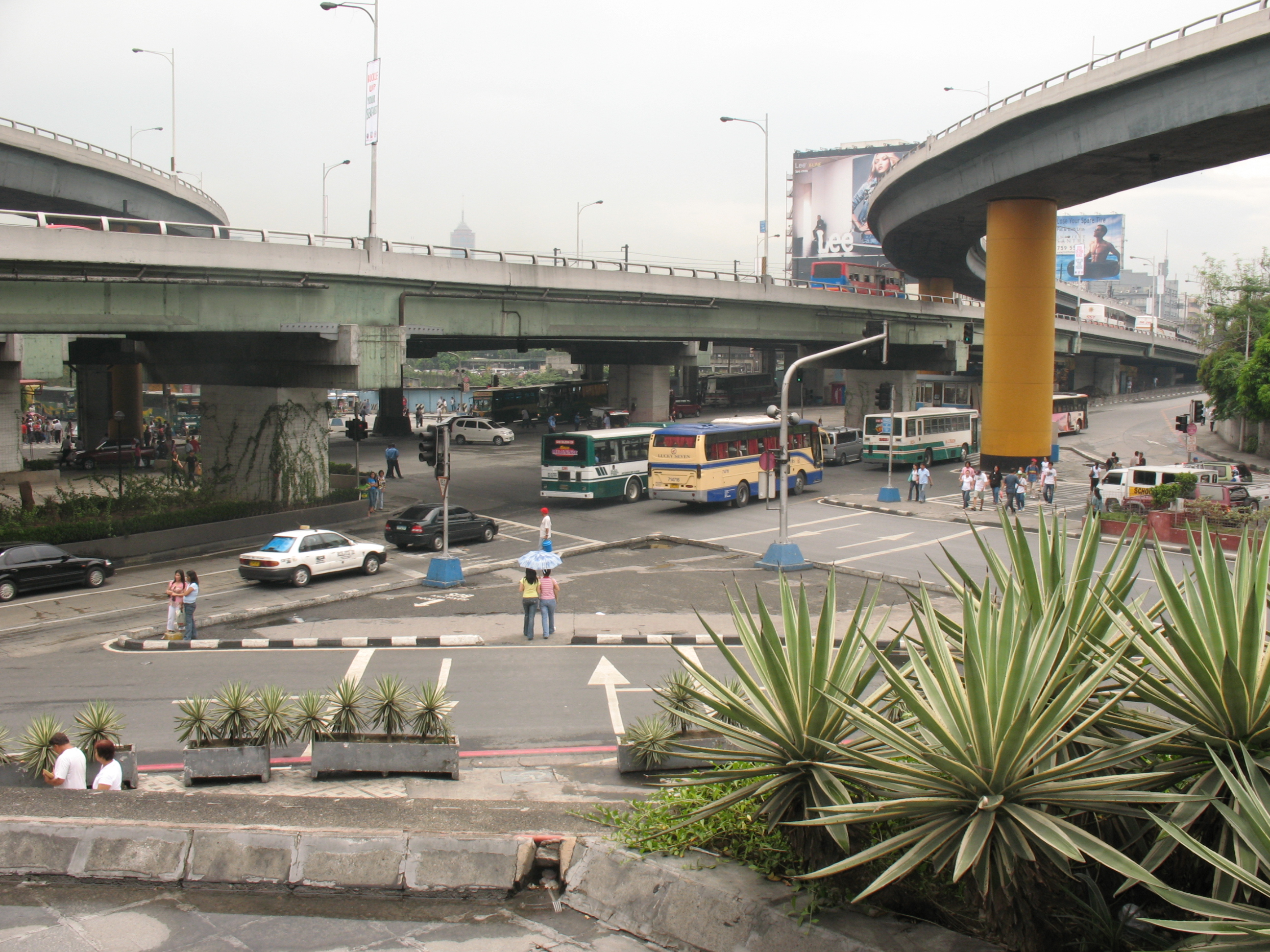
The EDSA-Ortigas Interchange on the ground level prior to the construction of its pedestrian footbridges

The primary impetus for constructing the Ortigas Interchange was the need to improve travel times along Epifanio de los Santos Avenue (EDSA), with the road already suffering from severe traffic congestion. On January 11, 1991, President Corazon Aquino approved the construction of the interchange along with two other major road projects. However, the urgent need to resolve traffic problems on EDSA allowed for the project to be expedited.

Construction of the ₱400 million interchange began on April 1, 1991, with work being contracted to F. F. Cruz and Co., one of the Philippines' largest construction companies, under the supervision of the Department of Public Works and Highways. The interchange's northbound lanes were opened to traffic on December 23, 1991.

Between 1993 and 1998, maintenance of the Ortigas Interchange was handled by the Manila Jaycees under an agreement that the group signed with the Metropolitan Manila Authority.

During the Second EDSA Revolution in 2001, crowds gathered around the Ortigas Interchange and the EDSA Shrine, demanding President Joseph Estrada's resignation.

As of July 2020, with the implementation of the EDSA Carousel on the dedicated EDSA Busway, city buses no longer traverse the service roads at the Ortigas Interchange and instead use the northbound and southbound flyovers.

=== 2026 bus fire ===
On April 24, 2026, at around 6:10 pm, both the southbound flyover and the northbound left-turning flyover towards Greenhills were closed to traffic after a tourist bus caught fire on the southbound flyover. The incident also led to delayed MRT-3 trips at 6:30 pm. Train services later resumed with speed restrictions between the Ortigas and Santolan-Annapolis stations at 6:50 pm.

The southbound flyover was reopened on April 25 following an initial inspection by the Department of Public Works and Highways (DPWH). The northbound left-turning flyover remained closed until April 27, where it was reopened to light vehicles only with a speed limit of 20 km/h (12 mph) and a height restriction of 2.40 m (7.9 ft). The restriction was put in place pending a more detailed structural analysis by the DPWH after exposed rebars and concrete spalling were observed on portions of the structure affected by the fire.

== Criticism ==
Though intended to alleviate traffic congestion on the Ortigas portion of EDSA, the Ortigas Interchange has been criticized for worsening traffic congestion. In a column in the Philippine Daily Inquirer, the at-grade service roads of the Ortigas Interchange were criticized in 2013 for being "too narrow" at two to three lanes per direction. The pavement quality on the southbound service road at the time was also criticized as poor, causing motor vehicles to drive slowly on the service road and contributing to the traffic congestion in the area.

In 2018, a spiral staircase along the EDSA-Ortigas pedestrian footbridge was criticized on social media for its "narrow and dizzy" design. The staircase was originally constructed in 2008 for disembarking provincial bus passengers to climb the footbridge.

== See also ==
- Epifanio de los Santos Avenue
- Ortigas Avenue
- Media related to EDSA-Ortigas Interchange at Wikimedia Commons
