= Circumferential Road 6 =

Road in the Philippines

C-6 Circumferential Road 6
- C-6 Road
- C-6 in Barangay Hagonoy, Taguig

Major junctions
- Beltway around Manila
- South end: N142 (M. L. Quezon Avenue) / N143 (General Santos Avenue) in Taguig
- North end: Batasan–San Mateo Road in San Mateo, Rizal (planned); N601 in Taytay, Rizal (current)

Location
- Country: Philippines
- Major cities: Pasig and Taguig
- Towns: Taytay, Rizal and San Mateo, Rizal

Highway system
- Roads in the Philippines; Highways; Expressways; List

Circumferential Road 6 (C-6), informally known as the C-6 Road, is a network of roads and bridges which will comprise the sixth and outermost beltway of Metro Manila once completed.

The road would link Metro Manila with the provinces of Bulacan in the north, Rizal in the east, and Cavite in the south via Phase 2, passing through the cities of Pasig, Taguig, and Muntinlupa.

== History and alignment proposals ==
The development of a major road network in Manila was first conceived in the Metropolitan Thoroughfare Plan of 1945, predicting that the metropolis would expand further to the shorelines of Laguna de Bay. The plan proposed the laying of circumferential roads 1 to 6 and radial roads 1 to 10.

Eventually conceived during the Ferdinand Marcos Sr. administration, C-6 was intended to be a 59.5-kilometer (37.0 mi) long circumferential road linking the North Luzon Expressway in Bulacan and the South Luzon Expressway in Muntinlupa, passing through Marilao and San Jose del Monte in Bulacan, Rodriguez, San Mateo, Antipolo and Taytay in Rizal, and extending to Bacoor, Imus, Kawit and Noveleta in Cavite; it was also proposed to include the northern section of Commonwealth Avenue and Alabang–Zapote Road. Additionally, there were proposals for its northern endpoint to connect with the proposed Manila–Bataan Coastal Road in Navotas or Bulakan, near Manila Bay. The project, now known as the Metro Manila Expressway, also known as the Skyway Stage 4. Phase 1, Known as the Southeast Metro Manila Expressway, is expected to run from Arca South in Taguig to the Batasang Pambansa Complex in Quezon City, and Phase 2, also known as the East Metro Manila Expressway, will connect San Mateo, Rizal to San Jose del Monte, Bulacan. Phase 3, dubbed as the Northeast Metro Manila Expressway, will also extend the highway to NLEX, and possibly to NMIA in the future.

== Route description ==
=== Taguig ===
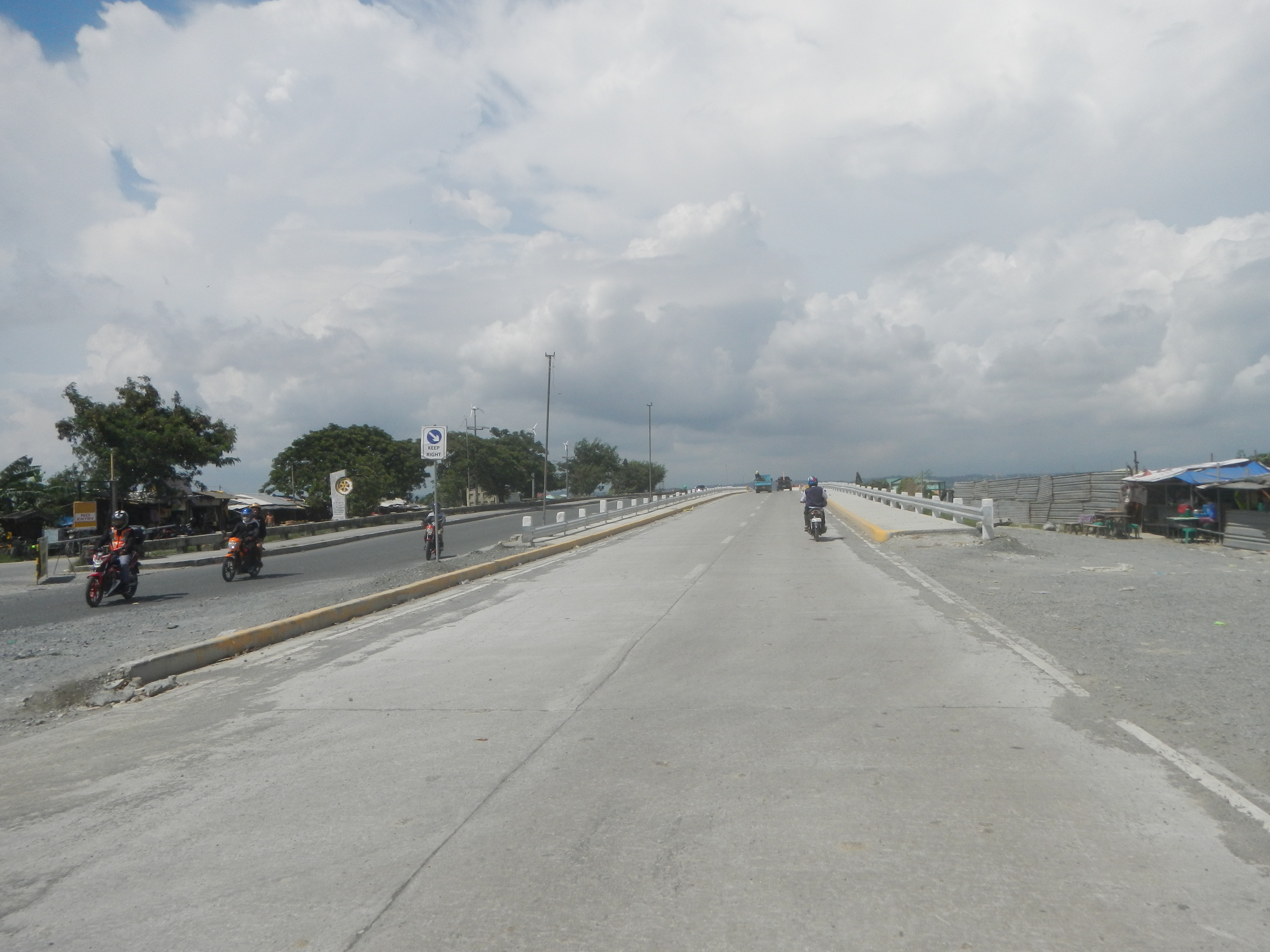
View north along the Laguna Lake Highway approaching the Napindan Bridge in Taguig

C-6 in Taguig is a four-lane road built in 2009 along the shore of Laguna de Bay. It was constructed as a two-lane road which runs for approximately 7 kilometers (4.3 mi) from M.L. Quezon Street in Lower Bicutan, Taguig to the Napindan Bridge over the Pasig River on the city's border with Pasig. The road project was approved in 2002 as the Taguig Road Dike intended to run for 9.8 kilometers (6.1 mi) from the South Luzon Expressway towards Rizal, which also serves as flood control for the city. In February 2017, the road was widened to four lanes and renamed by the Department of Public Works and Highways (DPWH) as the Laguna Lake Highway.

The road is planned to link to the proposed Laguna Lakeshore Expressway Dike.

=== Pasig to Taytay ===
After crossing the mouth of the Pasig River at Napindan Bridge, it veers towards the northern riverbank and briefly traverses Barangay Pinagbuhatan in Pasig before entering the province of Rizal at Taytay. There, the route becomes Sampaguita Street, a six lane road. The road circles around the residential community of Lupang Arenda until it reaches the Tapayan Pumping Station.

The route then turns right into a pair of two-lane bridges and continues on as Ejercito Avenue until it reaches the Manggahan Floodway. it crosses the waterway via Barkadahan Bridge, a pair of 2 lane bridges.

It then continues on as Highway 2000, a four-lane road, until it reaches the area of the Taytay Public Market. There, it splits into two two-lane, one-way roads named Market Road that loop around the market before terminating at a pair of intersections with Rizal Avenue, a component of the Manila East Road.

== Intersections ==
Province	City/Municipality	km	mi	Destinations	Notes
Taguig				N142 (M.L. Quezon Avenue) / N143 (General Santos Avenue)	Southern Terminus. Traffic light intersection. Continues on as General Santos Avenue.
Taguig				R. Adriano Street	Southbound right-in, right out. Access to and from northbound via U-turn slots. Alternate access to Lower Bicutan.
Taguig				Marichu Rodriguez Tiñga Avenue	Southbound right-in, right out. Access to and from northbound via U-turn slots. Alternate access to Hagonoy, New Lower Bicutan, Signal Village, and Circumferential Road 5.
Taguig				Hagonoy Pumping Station Bridge	Over Hagonoy Reservoir
Taguig				Taguig City General Hospital Access Road	Manned intersection
Taguig				Seagull Drive	Flashing yellow light intersection. Access to Barangay San Miguel.
Taguig				Taguig Pumping Station Bridge	Over Taguig River
Taguig				San Isidro Road	Southbound right-in, right out. Access to and from northbound via U-turn slots. Access to Barangay Santa Ana.
Taguig				Ruhale Street	Southbound right-in, right out. Access to and from northbound via U-turn slots. Access to Barangay Calzada-Tipas.
Taguig				Labasan Pumping Station Bridge	Over Tipas River
Taguig				Earth Road	Southbound right-in, right out. Access to and from northbound via U-turn slots. Alternate access to Napindan.
Taguig				Tipas-Napindan Road	Southbound right-in, right out. Access to northbound via U-turn slots. Access to Napindan.
Pasig River				Napindan Bridge	
Pasig					Access road to Nagpayong.
Rizal	Taytay			Kenneth Road	Unmanned intersection. Also acts as Pasig-Taytay border.
Rizal	Taytay			Ejercito Avenue	Unmanned intersection. Alternate access to Pinagbuhatan in Pasig.
Rizal	Taytay			Tapayan Bridge	Over Antipolo River
Rizal	Taytay			West Bank Road	Unlighted intersection. Access to Taytay Fishport.
Rizal	Taytay			Barkadahan Bridge	Over Manggahan Floodway
Rizal	Taytay			Casimiro A. Ynares Sr. Boulevard	Traffic light intersection. Access to Pasig and Angono.
Rizal	Taytay			N601 (Rizal Avenue)	Two one-way intersections around the New Taytay Public Market. Current Northern Terminus.
1.000 mi = 1.609 km; 1.000 km = 0.621 mi: Incomplete access; Route transition; Unopened

== See also ==
- List of roads in Metro Manila
- Media related to Circumferential Road 6 at Wikimedia Commons
