= J. Ruiz station =

LRT Line 2 station in San Juan

J. Ruiz
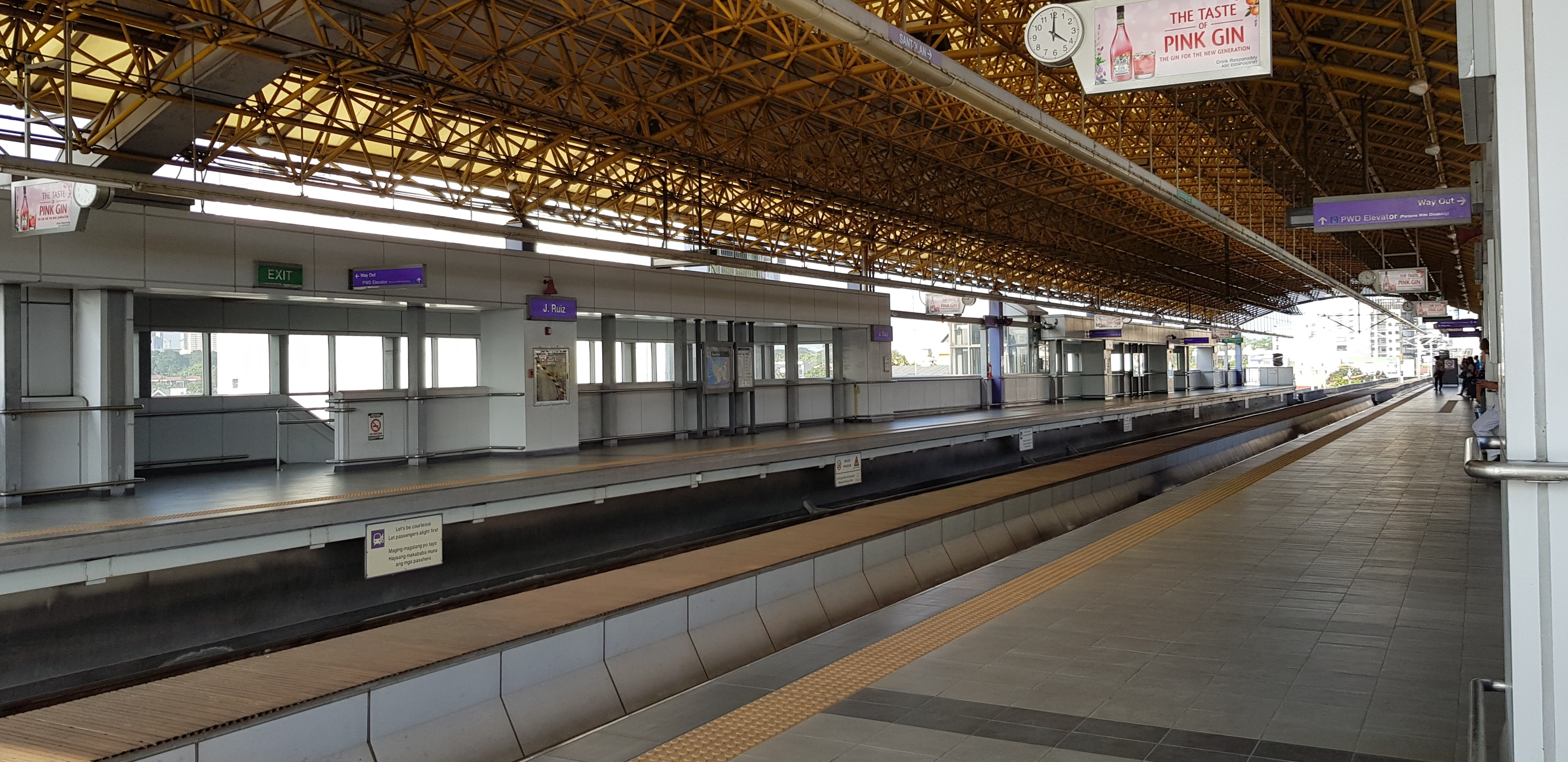

General information
- Location: Aurora Boulevard, Salapan; San Juan, Metro Manila; Philippines
- Coordinates: 14°36′38″N 121°1′34″E
- Owner: Department of Transportation; Light Rail Transit Authority
- Line: LRT Line 2
- Platforms: 2 (2 side)
- Tracks: 2
- Connections: 3 (Antipolo - Quiapo)

Construction
- Structure type: Elevated
- Accessible: Concourse: None; Platforms: All platforms

Other information
- Station code: PL05

History
- Opened: April 5, 2004; 22 years ago

Services
Preceding station	Manila LRT	Following station
Gilmore towards Antipolo	LRT Line 2	V. Mapa towards Recto
Track layout
Location
- Location within Metro Manila Location within Luzon Location within Philippines

J. Ruiz station is an elevated Light Rail Transit (LRT) station located on the LRT Line 2 (LRT-2) system in San Juan. The station is named from its location on J. Ruiz Street.

J. Ruiz station is the fifth station for trains headed to Antipolo and the ninth station for trains headed to Recto. It is the only station in San Juan and is close to the borders of Quezon City before entering Manila.

It is named after Juan Ruiz, a Katipunero who took part in the siege of El Polvorin, where the Pinaglabanan Shrine is located. Opened on April 5, 2004, the station was part of the Phase II development of LRT-2 together with the Betty Go-Belmonte, Gilmore, V. Mapa, Pureza and Legarda stations.

== Nearby landmarks ==
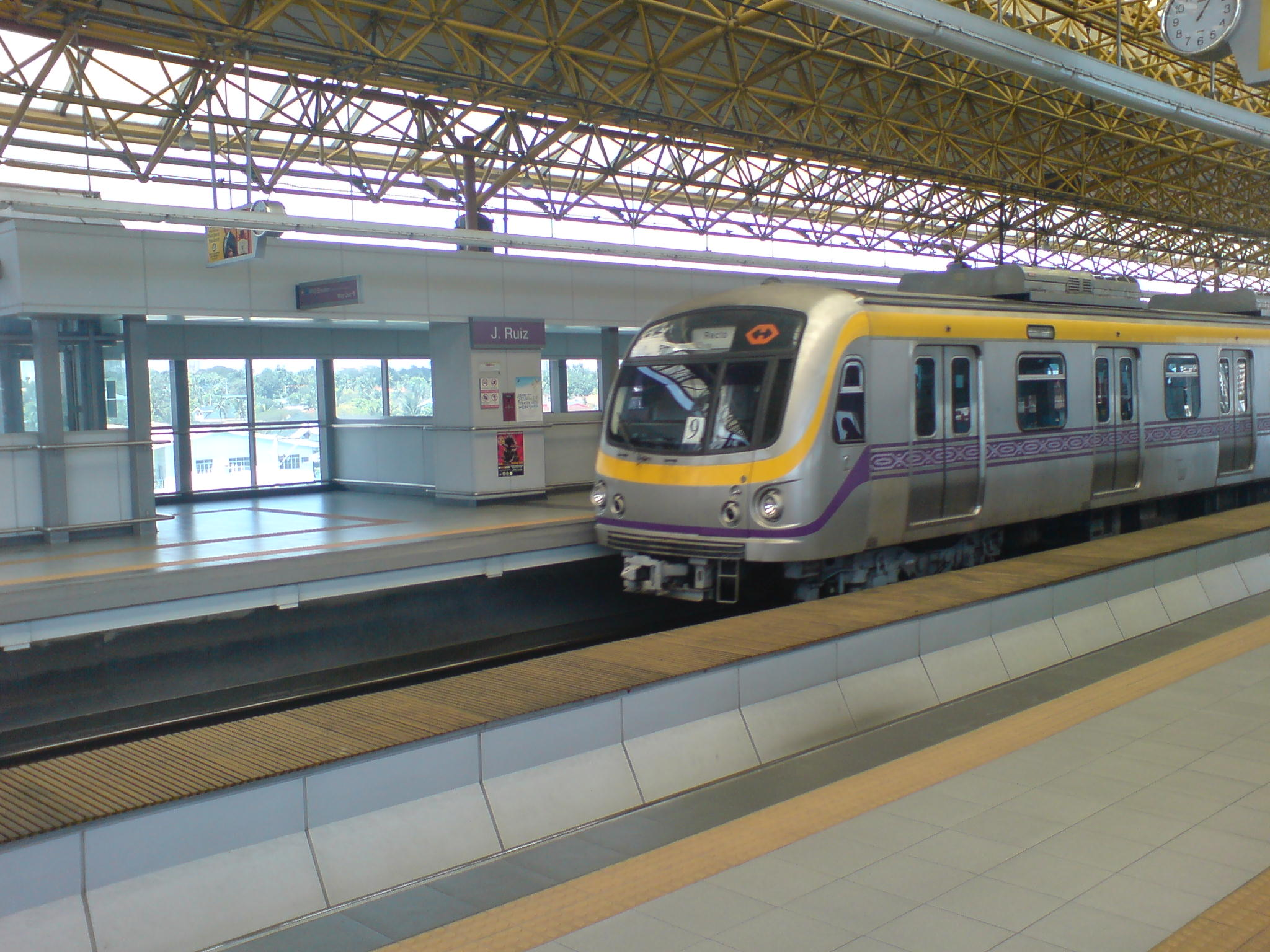
A train arriving at J. Ruiz station

As the only station in San Juan, it serves the inner areas of the city including N. Domingo Street, where the San Juan City Hall and San Juan Medical Center are located, and Pinaglabanan district, where Pinaglabanan Shrine and St. John the Baptist Church stand. It has a school on it, particularly Community of Learners.

== Transportation links ==
Buses, taxis, and jeepneys can be found at both gates of the station, while tricycles are available at the south gate.

== Cultural references ==
Instead of the 1896 revolutionary cited above, the name origin of J. Ruiz station was attributed to the protagonist of the 2022 Filipino novel Revolution: 80 Days, namely Juan Ruiz, a former soldier turned migrant worker.

== See also ==
Station exterior

- Manila Light Rail Transit System Line 2
