= Tutuban station (LRT) =

Proposed LRT Line 2 station in Binondo, Manila

Tutuban

General information
- Location: Tondo, Manila
- Coordinates: 14°36′22.26″N 120°58′19.05″E
- System: Manila Light Rail Transit System
- Owner: Department of Transportation; Light Rail Transit Authority
- Line: LRT Line 2
- Connections: Tutuban; Jeepneys, buses, taxis, and tricycles

Construction
- Structure type: Elevated
- Parking: Yes (168 Shopping Mall, Tutuban Center, 999 Mall)

Other information
- Status: Approved
- Station code: PW01

Services
Preceding station	Manila LRT	Following station
Recto towards Antipolo	LRT Line 2	Divisoria towards Pier 4
Location

Tutuban station is a proposed Manila Light Rail Transit (LRT) station situated on Line 2. It is part of the Line 2 West Extension project, a 3.02-kilometer (1.88 mi) extension from Recto station to the Manila North Harbor in Tondo. The west extension project calls for the construction of three additional elevated stations: two on Recto Avenue and one on Zaragoza Street near Pier 4 of the Manila North Harbor. It was approved by the National Economic and Development Authority on May 19, 2015. Ayala Land Inc., will benefit the said station as they already acquired Tutuban Center. Future developments will soon progress at the area the same time with LRT Tutuban Station construction.

The station would be the first for trains headed west from Recto and the eleventh for trains headed from Masinag. It would be located next to the Tutuban Center Mall near the intersection of Recto Avenue with Abad Santos Avenue 20 meters away, leading to the Tutuban railway station, connecting Line 2 with the PNR Metro Commuter Line and in the future with the PNR North-South Commuter Rail.

Currently, the station is in the planning stages.

== Nearby landmarks ==
When completed, the station will be connected to Tutuban Center, Tutuban station of the Philippine National Railways, Divisoria Shopping Mall, 168 Shopping Mall, 999 Mall, Lucky Chinatown, CityPlace Square, and other commercial establishments in the market district of Divisoria and Binondo.
