= Divisoria station =

Proposed LRT Line 2 station in Manila

Divisoria

General information
- Location: Tondo and San Nicolas, Manila
- Coordinates: 14°36′10.56″N 120°58′4.00″E
- System: Manila Light Rail Transit System
- Owner: Department of Transportation; Light Rail Transit Authority
- Line: Line 2

Construction
- Structure type: Elevated

Other information
- Status: Approved
- Station code: PW02

Services
Preceding station	Manila LRT	Following station
Tutuban towards Antipolo	LRT Line 2	Pier 4 Terminus
Location

Divisoria station is a proposed Manila Light Rail Transit (LRT) station situated on Line 2. It is part of the Line 2 West Extension project, a 3.02-kilometer (1.88 mi) extension from Recto station to the Manila North Harbor in Tondo. The west extension project calls for the construction of three additional elevated stations, two on Recto Avenue and one on Zaragoza Street near Pier 4 of the Manila North Harbor. It was approved by the National Economic and Development Authority last May 19, 2015.

The station would be the second for trains headed west from Recto and the eleventh for trains headed from Antipolo. It would be located west of the intersection of Recto Avenue with Asuncion Street.

Currently, the station is on the planning stages.
