= Santa Mesa station =

PNR Railway Station in Manila, Philippines

Santa Mesa
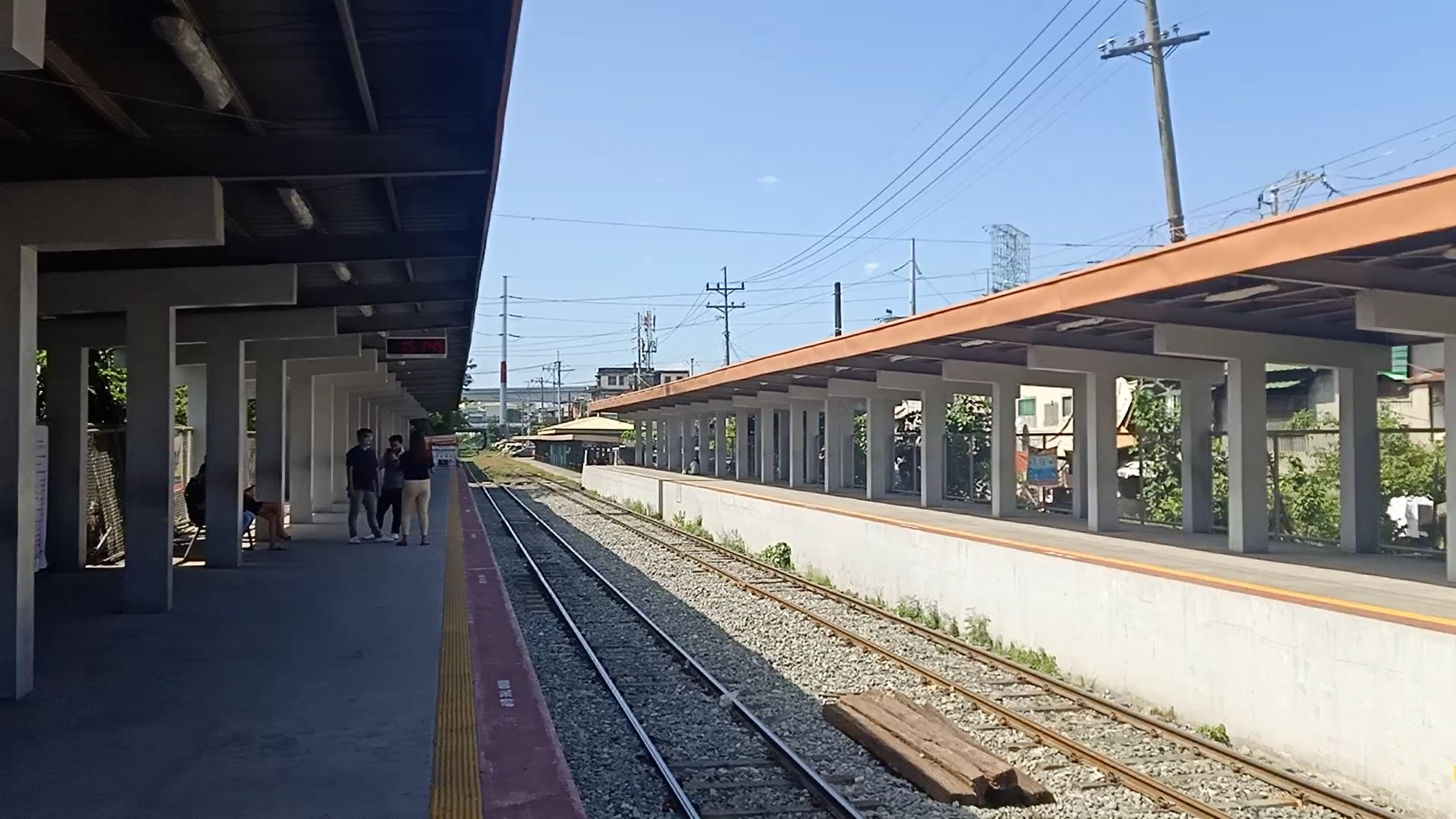
- Santa Mesa station platform area in February 2020.

General information
- Location: Altura Extension, Santa Mesa; Manila, Metro Manila; Philippines
- Coordinates: 14°36′2.74″N 121°0′37.25″E
- Owner: Philippine National Railways
- Operator: Philippine National Railways
- Lines: South Main Line; Planned: South Commuter; Former: Antipolo
- Platforms: Side platforms
- Tracks: 2
- Connections: Pureza; PUP Ferry Station; Jeepneys, buses, cycle rickshaws

Construction
- Structure type: At grade
- Parking: Yes
- Accessible: Yes

Other information
- Station code: SA

History
- Opened: December 22, 1905; 120 years ago
- Closed: March 28, 2024; 2 years ago
- Rebuilt: 1920; 106 years ago 2009; 17 years ago

Services
Preceding station	PNR	Following station
España towards Governor Pascual	North Shuttle	Paco towards Bicutan
España towards Tutuban	Metro South Commuter	Pandacan towards IRRI
Out-of-system interchange
Preceding station	Manila LRT	Following station
V. Mapa towards Antipolo	LRT Line 2 transfer at Pureza	Legarda towards Recto
Future services
Preceding station	PNR	Following station
España towards Clark International Airport	NSCR Commuter CIA–Calamba	Paco towards Calamba
España towards Tutuban	NSCR Commuter Tutuban–Calamba	Paco towards Calamba
España towards Clark International Airport	Commuter Express CIA–Calamba	Buendia towards Calamba
España towards Tutuban	Commuter Express Tutuban–Calamba	Buendia towards Calamba
Location
- Location within Manila Location within Metro Manila Location within Luzon Location within Philippines

Santa Mesa station is a railway station located on the South Main Line in the city of Manila, Philippines. It is one of two stations (the other is Pasay Road) in the line to have its own access road.

The station is the fourth station southbound from Tutuban and is the only railway station serving Santa Mesa.

In addition to having its own dedicated access road, Santa Mesa station is also one of three stations (the others being Pasay Road and España) to have its original platforms extended and raised in order to accommodate new PNR diesel multiple units. The original platforms have been retained for the use of Commuter Express locomotives and especially for intercity trains, although Santa Mesa is not designated as a station where these trains can stop. The station used to serve the Antipolo and Montalban lines, also known as Guadalupe line, which used to run up to Antipolo and Montalban in Rizal. This line has since been dismantled.

== History ==
Santa Mesa was opened on December 22, 1905, as a station originally situated on the Antipolo and Montalban lines. From this station, the Main Line South, as well as its subsequent branch lines which were later abandoned (Naic and Carmona, Cavite; Batangas; Bay, Santa Cruz and Pagsanjan, Laguna; Canlubang, Laguna), branched out southwest from the line heading east southeast to Antipolo and Montalban. Main Line South was constructed not long afterward and was the first railway line of Manila Railroad Company (MRR, later PNR) crossing the Pasig River, with Pandacan and all the oil refineries and other branch lines, including one right to the former site of Philippine Vegetable Oil Company in Santa Mesa, being constructed right after the Pasig River bridge.

Station operations were suspended on March 28, 2024, as part of the Tutuban–Alabang segment, to make way for the construction of the North–South Commuter Railway.

== Reconstruction ==
Santa Mesa station will be reconstructed as part of the North–South Commuter Railway. The two side platforms at the new station building's fifth level will be the highest in the world from ground level at 29.9 meters (98 ft), exceeding Smith–Ninth Streets station's 26.7 meters (88 ft).

== Nearby landmarks ==
The station is near landmarks such as the Santa Mesa Public Market, SM City Sta. Mesa, Puregold Sta. Mesa, the main campus of the Polytechnic University of the Philippines (PUP), the Eulogio "Amang" Rodriguez Institute of Science and Technology (EARIST), the Sacred Heart of Jesus Catholic School, and the Philippine headquarters of the Tzu Chi Foundation.

== Transportation links ==
Santa Mesa station is accessible by jeepneys and buses plying the Ramon Magsaysay Boulevard route. Several cycle rickshaw terminals are also located near the station.

A Line 2 station, Pureza, is a short walk from Santa Mesa station. Alternately, commuters may opt to ride tricycles to there.
