= Gilmore station (LRT) =

LRT Line 2 station in Quezon City

Gilmore
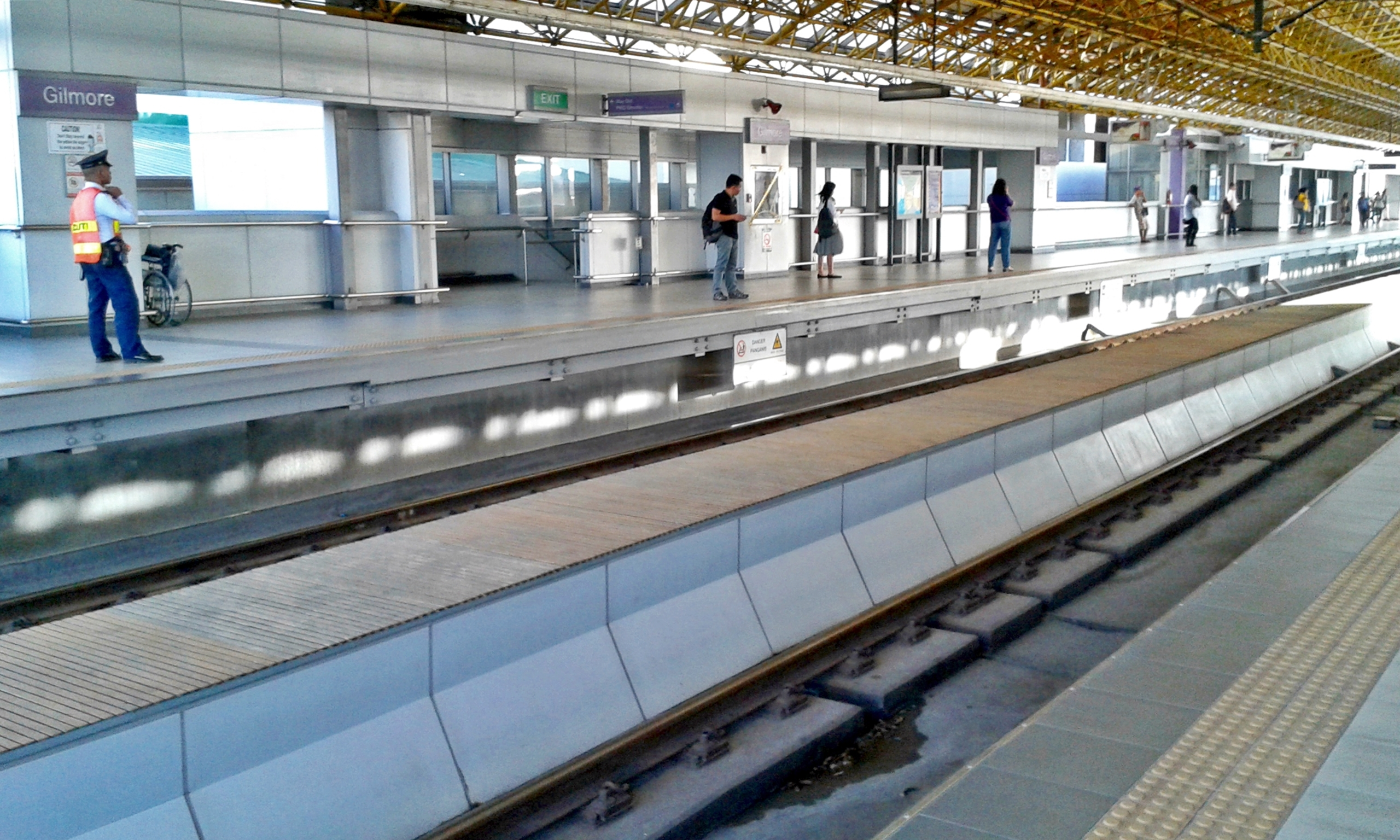

General information
- Location: Aurora Boulevard, Mariana; Quezon City, Metro Manila; Philippines
- Coordinates: 14°36′48″N 121°2′2″E
- Owner: Department of Transportation; Light Rail Transit Authority
- Line: LRT Line 2
- Platforms: 2 (2 side)
- Tracks: 2
- Connections: 3 Gilmore; 6 Gilmore

Construction
- Structure type: Elevated
- Parking: Yes (Princeton Residences, K. Pointe)
- Cycle facilities: Bicycle racks (South Entrance only)
- Accessible: Concourse: South Entrance only Platforms: All platforms

Other information
- Station code: PL06

History
- Opened: April 5, 2004; 22 years ago

Services
Preceding station	Manila LRT	Following station
Betty Go-Belmonte towards Antipolo	LRT Line 2	J. Ruiz towards Recto
Track layout
Location
- Location within Metro Manila Location within Luzon Location within Philippines

Gilmore station is an elevated Light Rail Transit (LRT) station located on the LRT Line 2 (LRT-2) system in Mariana, Quezon City. It is named after the nearby Gilmore Avenue, which in turn is named for Eugene Allen Gilmore, Vice Governor-General of the Philippines from 1922 to 1929 who twice served as acting Governor-General of the Philippines.

The station is the sixth station for trains headed to Antipolo and the eighth station for trains headed to Recto.

== Nearby landmarks ==
The most recognizable landmarks closest to the station are SYKES Asia, Inc. (K-Pointe site), Saint Paul University Quezon City, Aurora Garden Plaza, Gilmore I.T. Center, and Robinsons Magnolia. The station is also the closest station for passengers heading to Saint Joseph's College of Quezon City, St. Luke's Medical Center – Quezon City, Our Lady of Mount Carmel Parish, Broadway Centrum, and Trinity University of Asia, formerly Trinity College of Quezon City. San Juan and Greenhills Shopping Center are also accessible from this station, as Gilmore connects with Sen. Jose O. Vera Street (more popularly known as Granada Street) leading to Ortigas Avenue where Xavier School and Immaculate Conception Academy-Greenhills are located.

== Transportation links ==
Buses, taxis, jeepneys, and tricycles can be used for onward journeys.

During the early stages of the planned MRT Line 4, this station was to be connected to the planned N. Domingo Station; however, this was later shelved when the line was downscaled.

== Gallery ==
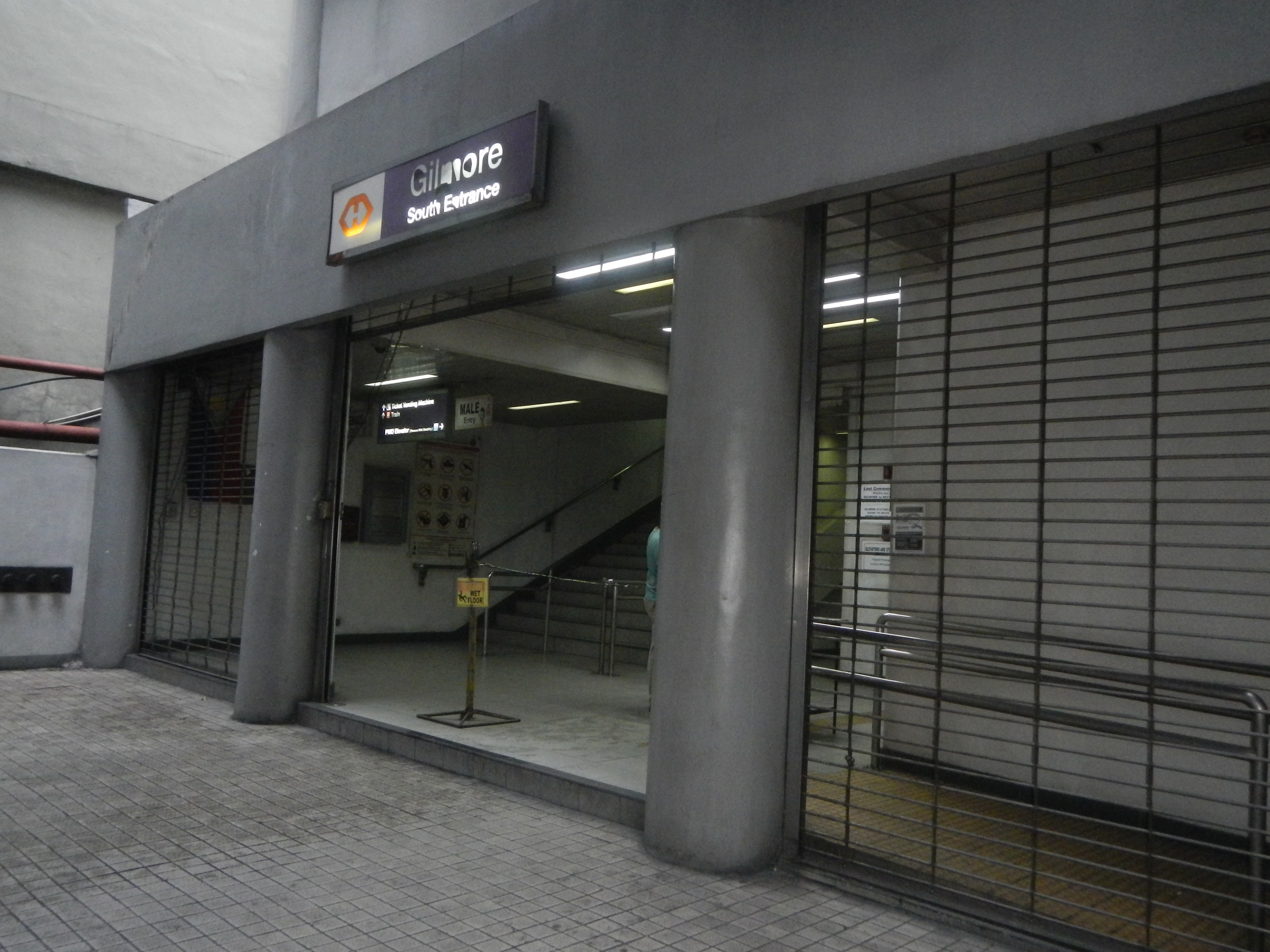
Station entrance

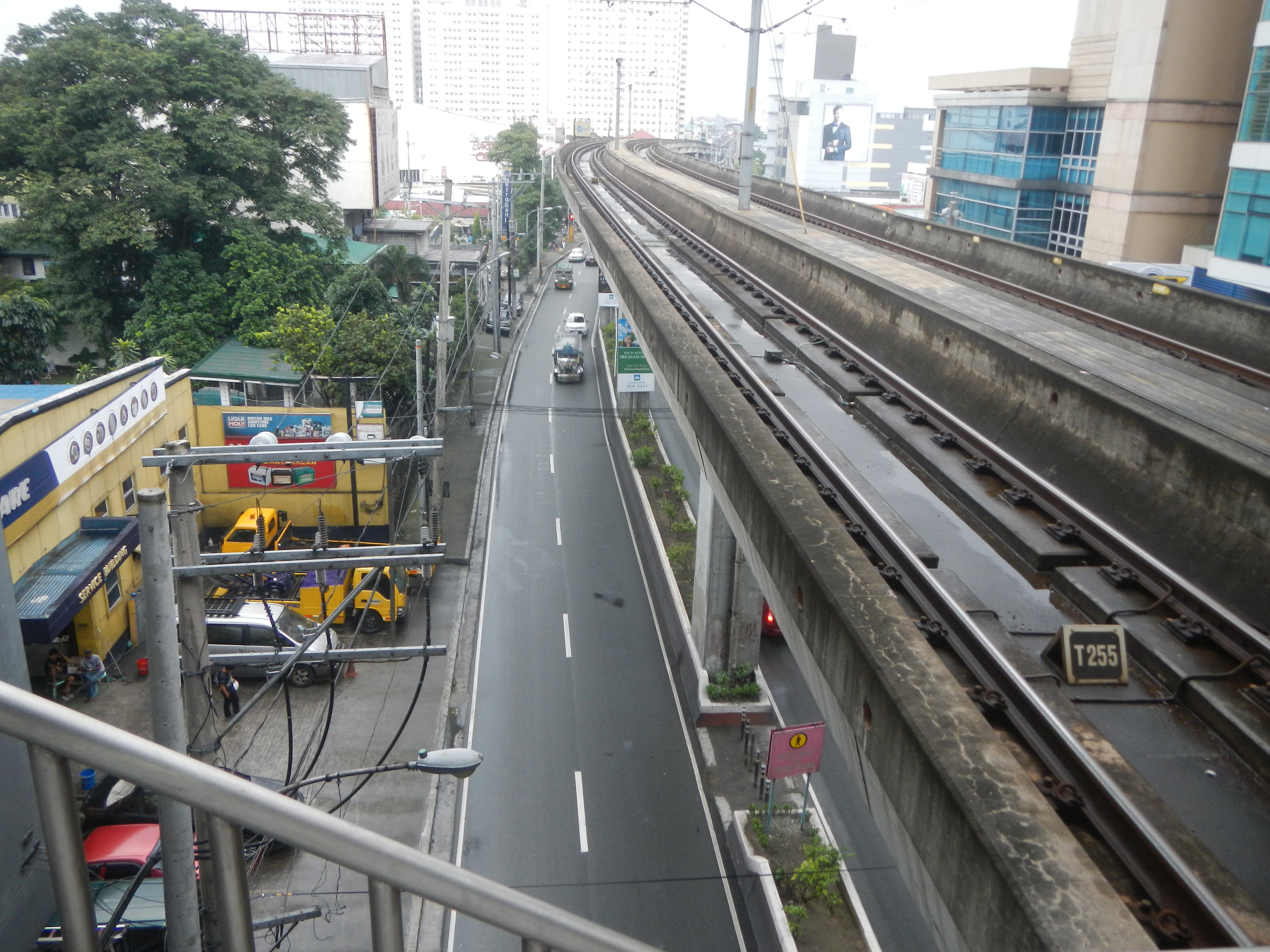
View of the tracks from the platform

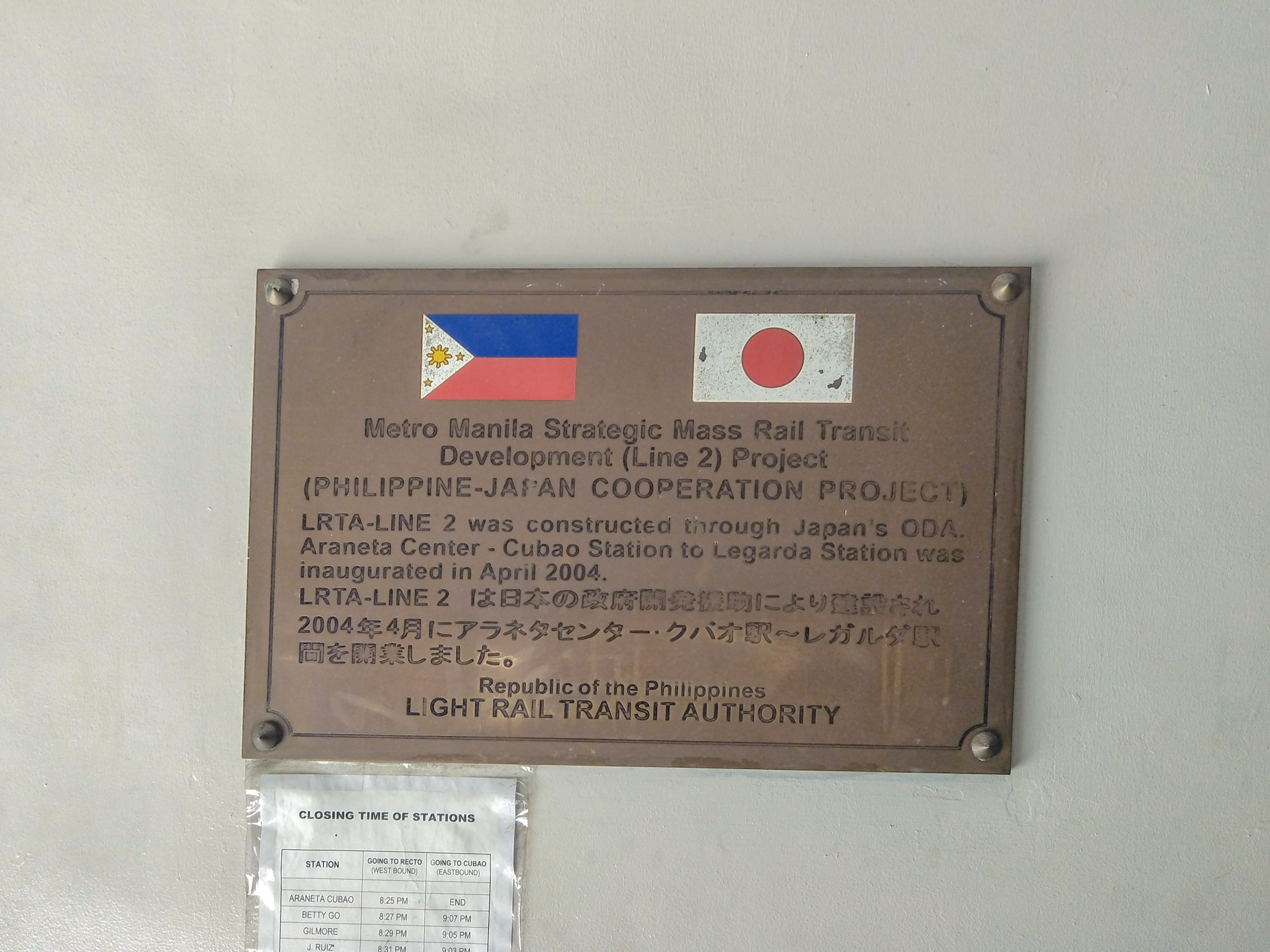
Inauguration plate

Platform view

== See also ==
- Manila Light Rail Transit System Line 2
