= Pureza station =

LRT Line 2 station in Santa Mesa, Manila

Pureza
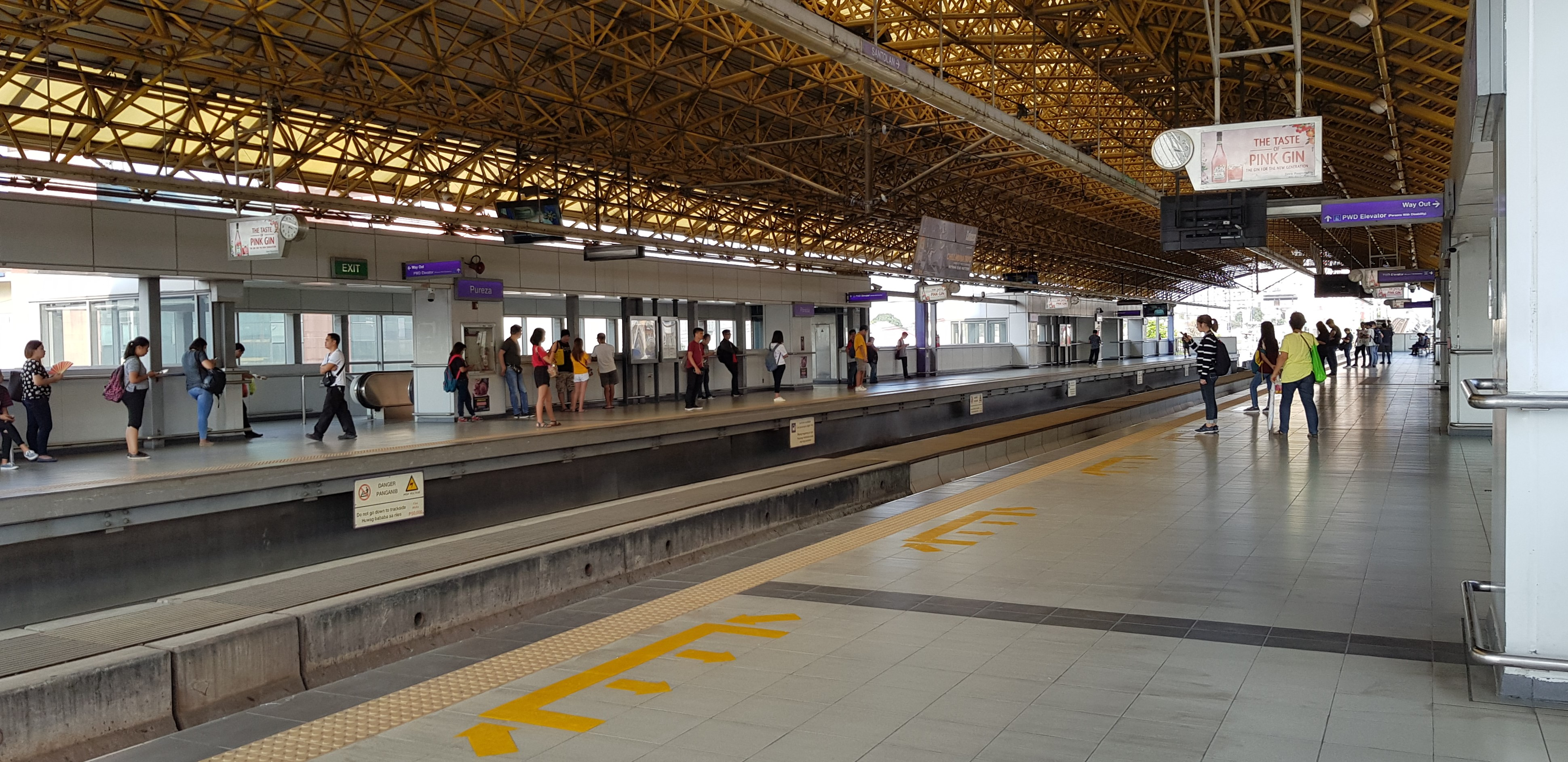

General information
- Location: Magsaysay Boulevard, Santa Mesa; Manila, Metro Manila; Philippines
- Coordinates: 14°36′6.0″N 121°0′18.7″E
- Owner: Department of Transportation
- Operator: Light Rail Transit Authority
- Line: LRT Line 2
- Platforms: 2 (2 side)
- Tracks: 2
- Connections: Santa Mesa; PUP Ferry Station; 2 (Angono - Quiapo) 3 (Antipolo - Quiapo)

Construction
- Structure type: Elevated
- Accessible: Concourse: South Entrance only Platforms: All platforms

Other information
- Station code: PL03

History
- Opened: April 5, 2004; 22 years ago

Services
Preceding station	Manila LRT	Following station
V. Mapa towards Antipolo	LRT Line 2	Legarda towards Recto
Out-of-system interchange
Preceding station	PNR	Following station
España towards Governor Pascual	North Shuttle transfer at Santa Mesa	Paco towards Bicutan
España towards Tutuban	Metro South Commuter transfer at Santa Mesa	Pandacan towards IRRI
Track layout
Location
- Location within Manila Location within Metro Manila Location within Luzon Location within Philippines

Pureza station is an elevated Light Rail Transit (LRT) station located on the LRT Line 2 (LRT-2) system in Santa Mesa, Manila. It is named because of its location near Pureza Street. The name originated from the Spanish word for "purity".

The station is the third station for trains headed to Antipolo and the eleventh station for trains headed to Recto.

== Accessibility ==
Station exterior

Pureza station is fully wheelchair accessible in the south entrance. However, the north entrance doesn't have an elevator to the concourse area.

== Nearby landmarks ==
The station's north entrance is interconnected with The Station Point commercial building, where the AMA Computer College Manila Campus is located. Landmarks nearby the station include other educational institutions such as De Ocampo Memorial College, Pio del Pilar Elementary School, Polytechnic University of the Philippines, Sacred Heart of Jesus Parish and Catholic School, Nuestra Señora de Salvacion Parish, and Eulogio "Amang" Rodriguez Institute of Science and Technology (EARIST). Commercial establishments in the vicinity include Puregold Jr. Pureza, Savemore Market, variety retail shops, and flea markets.

Some students studying in the University of Santo Tomas opt to depart from this station. A tricycle is available for transport to a jeepney terminal bound for Tayuman. The other station used by UST students in going to the university is the Legarda station. A bus terminal of AB Liner Inc., where buses bound for Tagkawayan, Quezon could be found, is located near the station.

A Philippine National Railways station, Santa Mesa, is a short walk from Pureza station. Also, it is planned to connect with the future station of the North–South Commuter Railway located in the same site. The PUP ferry station for the Pasig River Ferry Service is further south from Santa Mesa station.

== See also ==
- Manila Light Rail Transit System Line 2
