= Santolan station =

LRT Line 2 station in Pasig and Marikina

Santolan
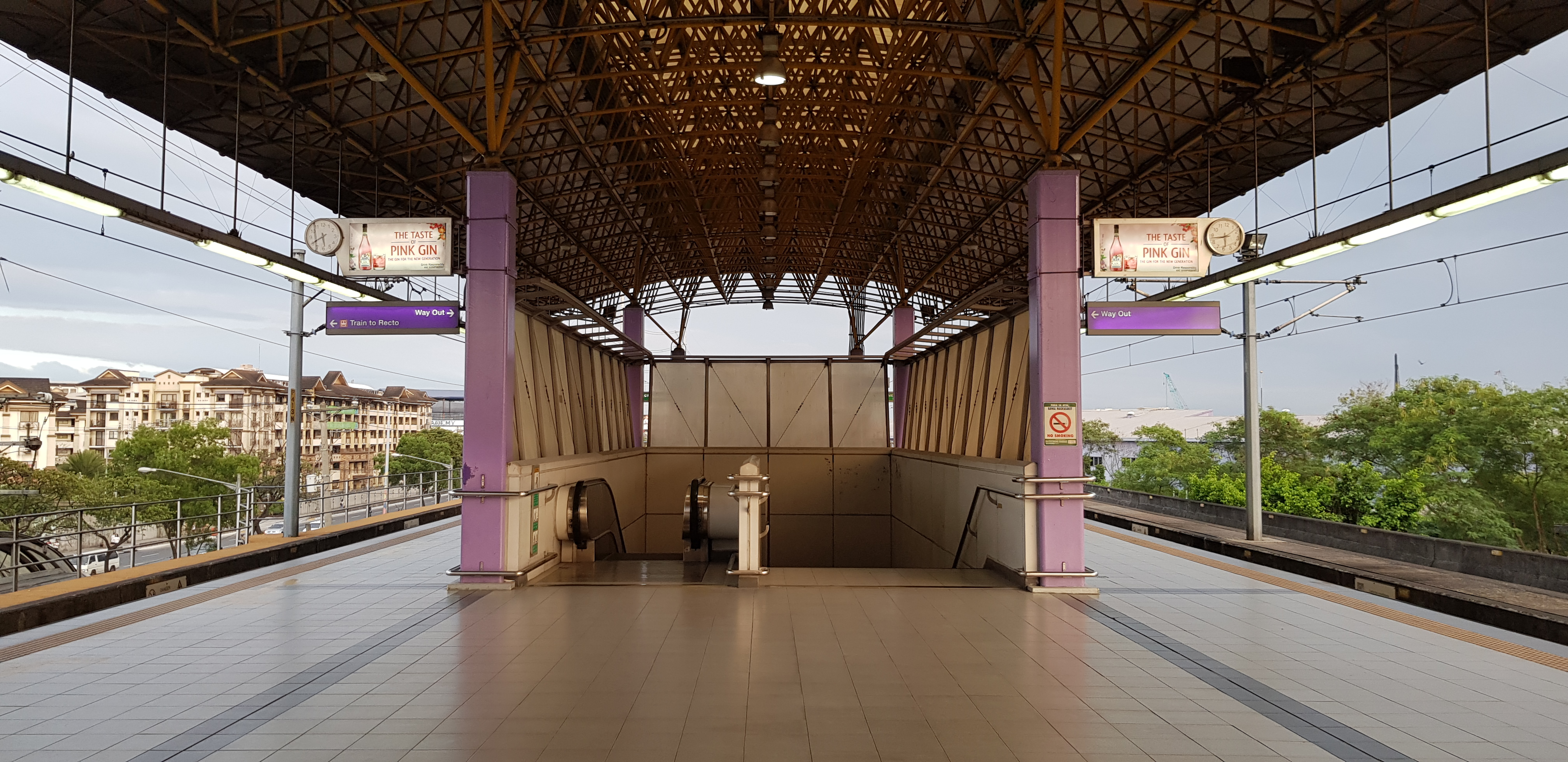

General information
- Location: Marikina-Infanta Highway, between Calumpang, Marikina and Santolan, Pasig, Metro Manila; Philippines
- Coordinates: 14°37′19.7″N 121°05′09.3″E
- Owner: Department of Transportation
- Operator: Light Rail Transit Authority
- Line: LRT Line 2
- Platforms: 2 (1 island)
- Tracks: 3
- Connections: BFCT East Marikina

Construction
- Structure type: Elevated
- Accessible: Concourse: Yes; Platforms: Yes

Other information
- Station code: PL11

History
- Opened: April 5, 2003; 23 years ago
- Former names: M. A. Roxas

Services
Preceding station	Manila LRT	Following station
Marikina–Pasig towards Antipolo	LRT Line 2	Katipunan towards Recto
Track layout
Location
- Location within Metro Manila Location within Luzon Location within Philippines

Santolan station is an elevated Light Rail Transit (LRT) station located on the LRT Line 2 (LRT-2) system between Santolan, Pasig and Calumpang, Marikina. It is situated along the Marikina–Infanta Highway. During the planning stages of the line, the station was initially referred to as M. A. Roxas, honoring him as the first President of the Third Republic, which achieved independence from the United States in 1946, because of its closeness to M. A. Roxas Street in Marikina.

Opened in 2003, the station served as the eastern terminus of the line until LRT-2 East Extension was opened in 2021. It currently serves as the eleventh station for trains headed to Antipolo and the third station for trains headed to Recto. The Santolan Depot, where the trains of the line are cleaned and maintained, is also near the station, as well as the line's Operations Control Center (OCC), both located in Pasig.

This is the only station on this line with an island platform.

== History ==
Santolan station was opened on April 5, 2003, as part of the initial section of LRT Line 2 between this station and Araneta Center–Cubao. It began as the eastern terminus of the line.

The station was temporarily closed due to a fire on October 3, 2019, which affected two rectifiers along the line: one between Katipunan and Anonas stations, and the other in the Santolan Depot. The station was reopened on January 22, 2021, after repairs to the rectifiers were completed.

== Nearby landmarks ==
The station is near the Marikina River, BFCT East Metro Manila Transport Terminal, SM City Marikina, and Riverbanks Center connecting via footbridge. It is also near Bali Oasis and College of Arts and Sciences of Asia and the Pacific in Marikina.

== Transportation links ==
Taxis, shuttle services, and jeepneys can be used to navigate the area around the station and along Marcos Highway, Marikina. It is also easily accessible to C-5 via Diosdado Macapagal Bridge going to Eastwood City, Ortigas Center, Makati Central Business District, Bonifacio Global City, as well as NAIA and SLEX.

== Gallery ==
Station exterior

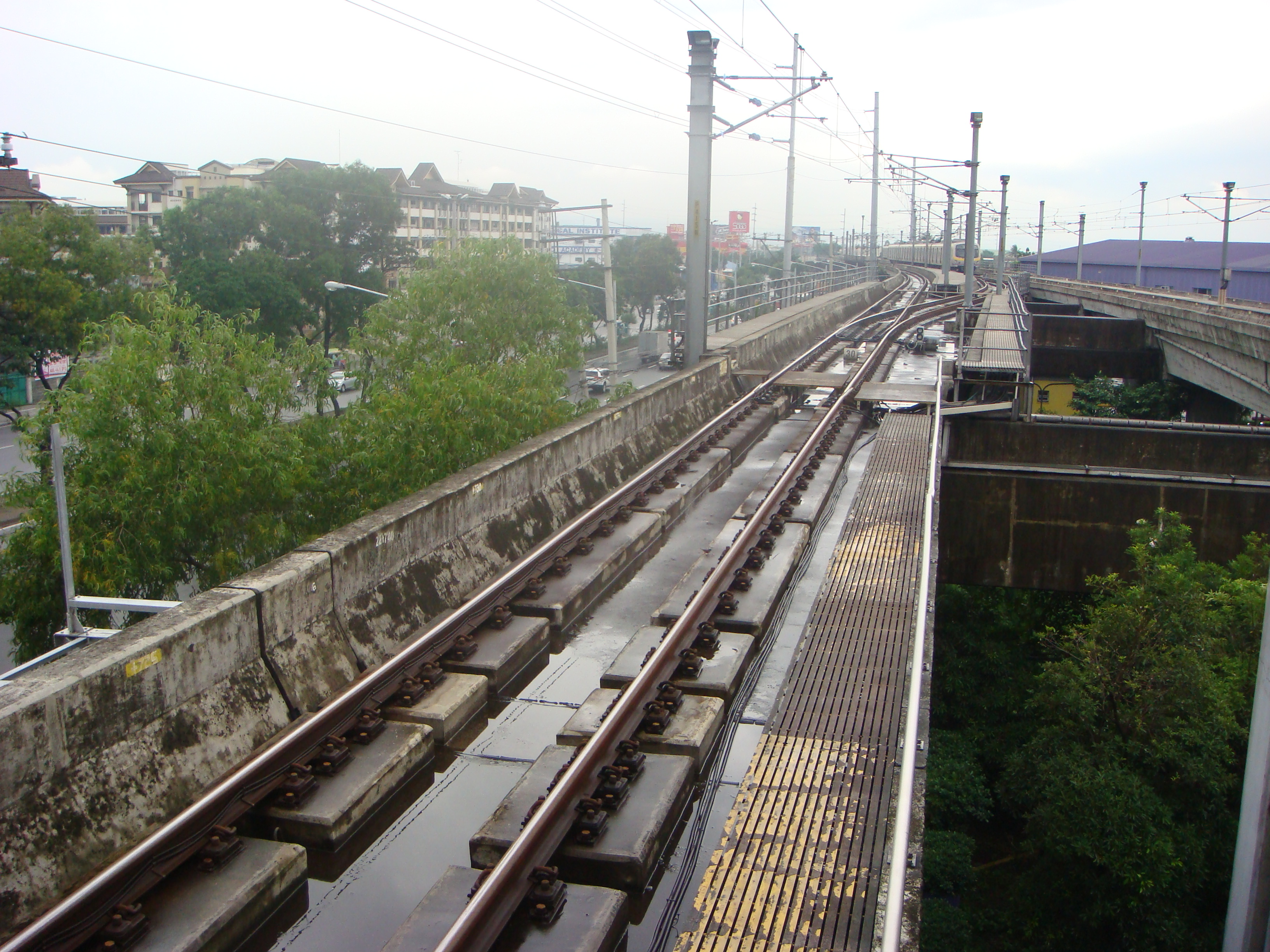
The tracks

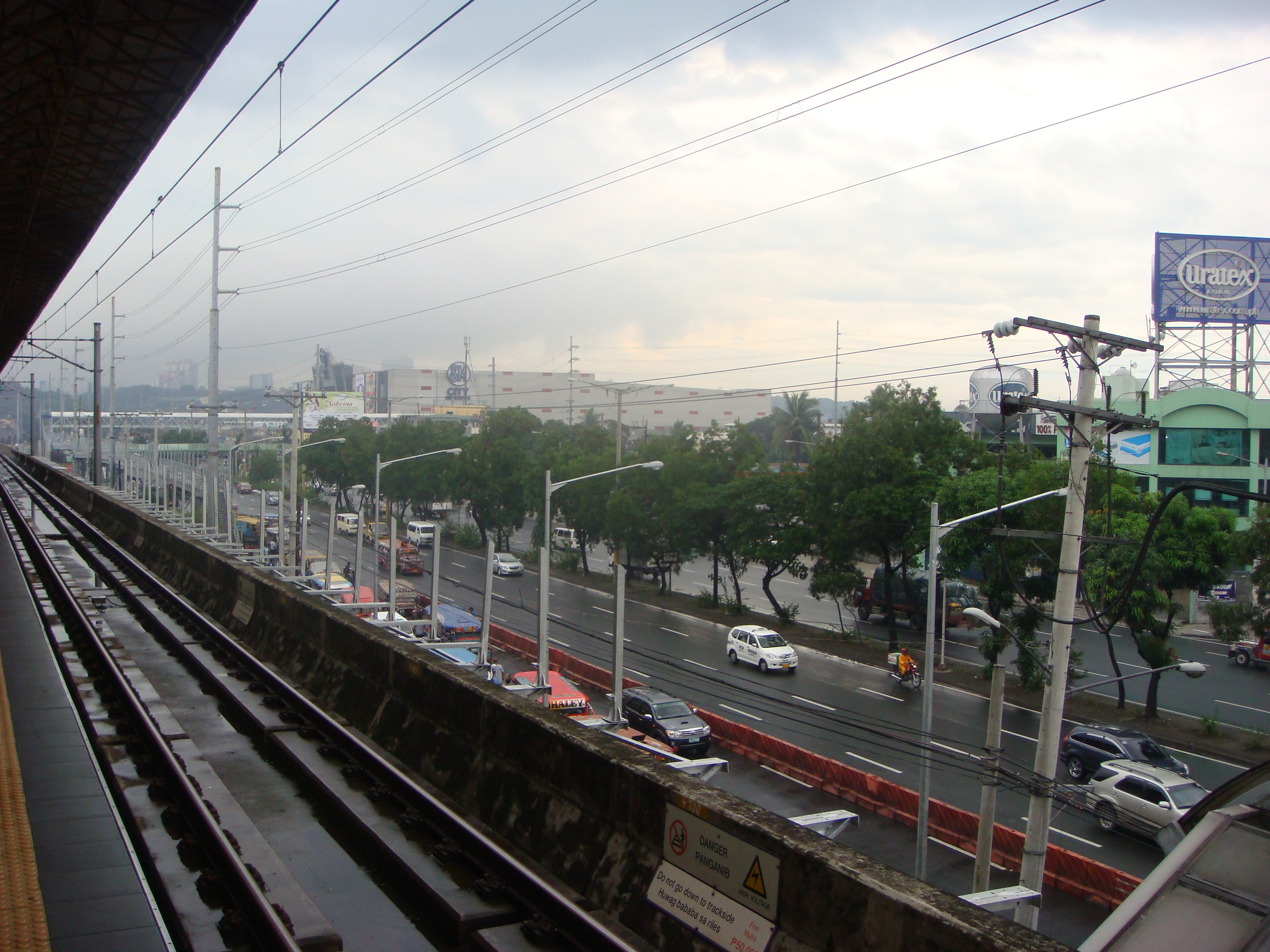
View of Barangay Calumpang from the station. Seen from the platform.

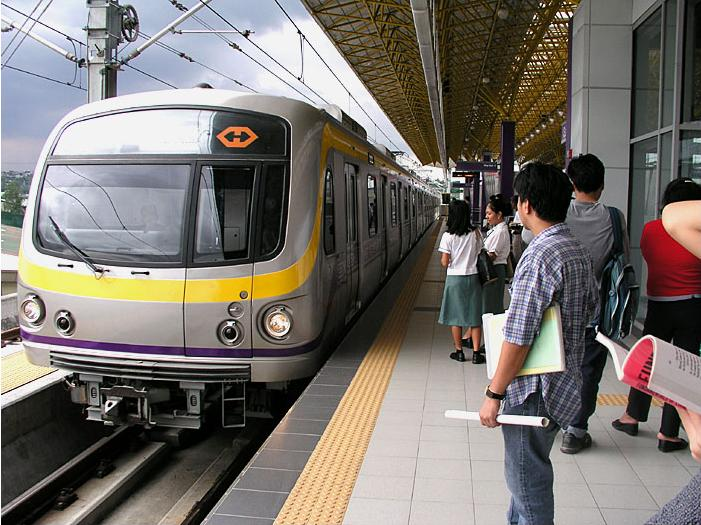
A train at the station

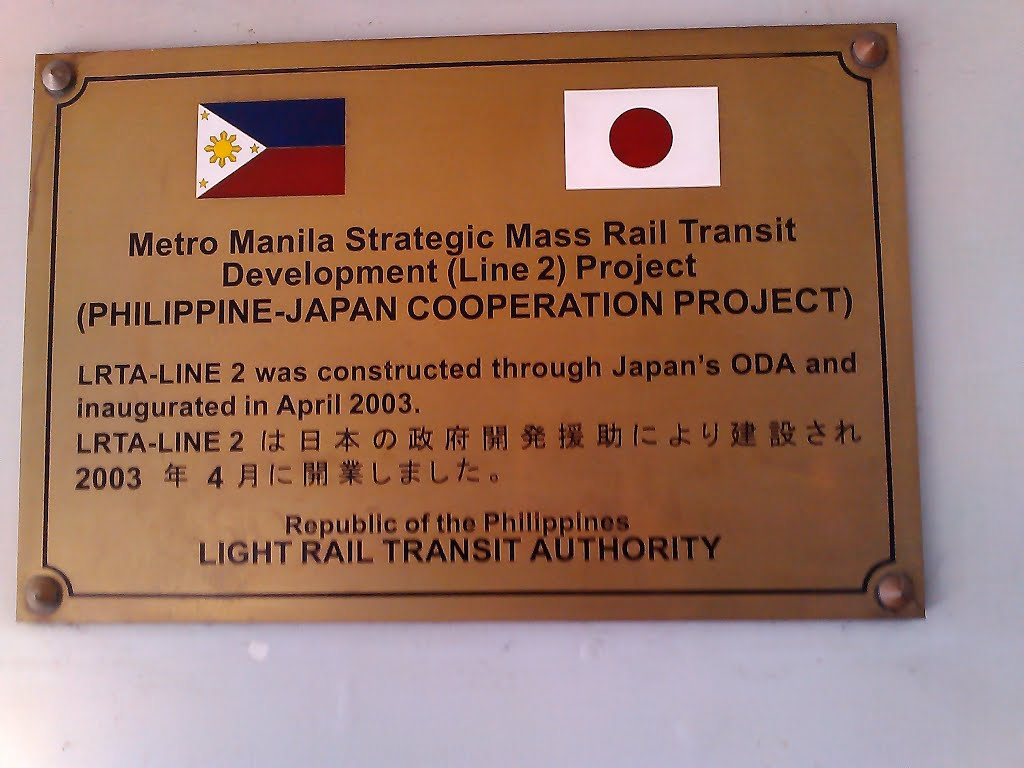
Inauguration Plate
