= Pier 4 station =

Proposed LRT Line 2 station in Tondo, Manila

Pier 4

General information
- Location: Zaragoza Street, Tondo, Manila
- Coordinates: 14°36′12.71″N 120°57′41.53″E
- System: Manila Light Rail Transit System
- Owner: Department of Transportation; Light Rail Transit Authority
- Line: LRT Line 2
- Connections: North Port Passenger Terminal

Construction
- Structure type: Elevated

Other information
- Status: Approved
- Station code: PW03

Services
Preceding station	Manila LRT	Following station
Divisoria towards Antipolo	LRT Line 2	Terminus
Location

Pier 4 station or Manila North Harbor station is a proposed Manila Light Rail Transit (LRT) station situated on Line 2 which will serve as the new western terminus of the line. It is part of the Line 2 West Extension project, which will extend the current line by up to 3.02 kilometers (1.88 mi). The extension line will begin at Recto station and will end at the Manila North Harbor in Tondo. The west extension project calls for the construction of three additional elevated stations, two on Recto Avenue and one on Zaragoza Street near Pier 4 of the Manila North Harbor. It was approved by the National Economic and Development Authority on May 19, 2015.

The station would be the third and last for trains headed west from Recto and the fifteenth or last for trains headed from Antipolo. The station will rise on Zaragoza Street and it will be located 80 meters east of Mel Lopez Boulevard, right in front of the Manila North Port Passenger Terminal Complex in Pier 4.

Currently, the station is in the planning stages.

== Nearby landmarks ==
When completed, the station will be close to the North Port Passenger Terminal of the Manila North Harbor complex, 2GO Travel headquarters, Philippine Coast Guard Parola Base, Rosauro Almario Elementary School, Roxas Bridge (formerly Del Pan) and San Nicolas district.

== See also ==
- Manila Light Rail Transit System Line 2
