= LRT Line 2 (Metro Manila) =

Manila Metro line

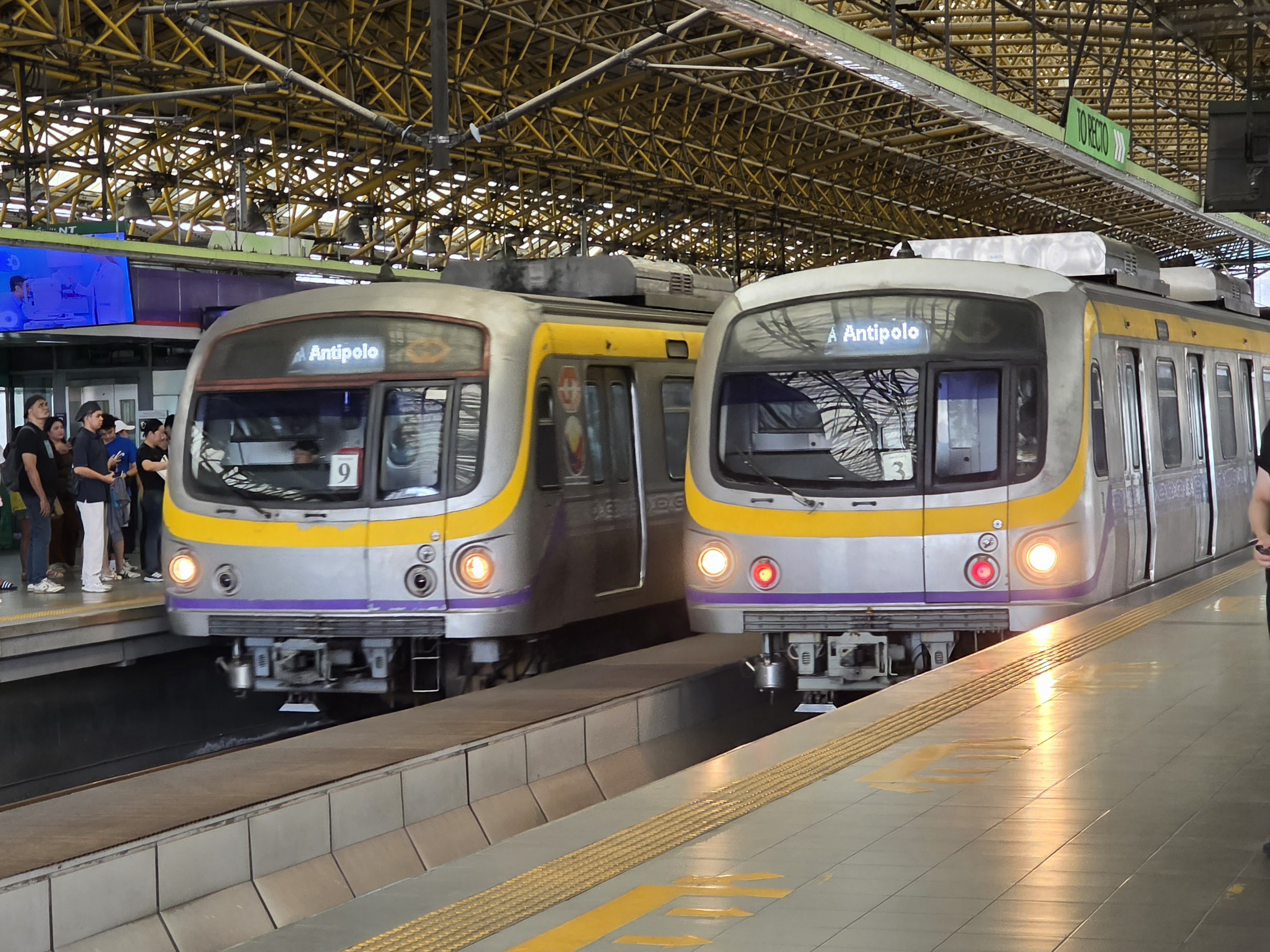
- Class 2000 trains at Araneta Center-Cubao

Overview
- Status: Operational
- Owner: Light Rail Transit Authority
- Line number: 2
- Locale: Metro Manila & Rizal, Philippines
- Termini: Pier 4 (future) Recto; Antipolo
- Stations: 19 (13 operational; 6 planned)
- Website: LRTA

Service
- Type: Rapid transit / Heavy rail
- System: Manila Light Rail Transit System
- Services: 1
- Operator: Light Rail Transit Authority
- Depot(s): Santolan, Pasig
- Rolling stock: LRTA 2000 class
- Daily ridership: 162,742 (2025)
- Ridership: 58.75 million (2025)

History
- Work began: November 15, 1997; 29 years ago
- Opened: April 5, 2003; 23 years ago
- Last extension: July 5, 2021; 5 years ago

Technical
- Line length: 17.6 km (10.9 mi)
- Num of tracks: Double
- Character: Elevated; Underground (Katipunan)
- Track gauge: 1,435 mm (4 ft 8 1/2 in) standard gauge
- Loading gauge: 4,300 mm × 3,354 mm (14 ft 1.3 in × 11 ft 0 in)
- Minimum radius: Mainline: 175 m (574 ft); Depot: 100 m (330 ft)
- Electrification: 1,500 V DC overhead catenary
- Operating speed: 45 to 80 km/h (28 to 50 mph)
- Signalling: Siemens TBS100 fixed block ATC under ATO GoA 2 (STO), with subsystems of ATP, Rail9000 ATS, and Westrace MK1 CBI
- Highest elevation: 45 m (148 ft) at Antipolo station
- Maximum incline: 5%
- Average inter-station distance: 1.28 km (0.80 mi)

The Light Rail Transit Line 2, also known as LRT Line 2, LRT-2, or Megatren, is a rapid transit line in Metro Manila in the Philippines owned and operated by the Light Rail Transit Authority (LRTA). The line generally runs in an east–west direction between Recto in Manila and Antipolo. The line is officially referred to as the Purple Line.

Although commonly known as LRT-2, the line is a high capacity heavy rail line that uses large metro cars which are longer and wider than those used on the PNR network and roughly the same size as those used on the MTR in Hong Kong, instead of the light rail vehicles used in earlier lines. Until the opening of MRT Line 7 in 2027, it is the country's only line that uses these types of trains.

Envisioned in the 1970s as part of the Metropolitan Manila Strategic Mass Rail Transit Development Plan, it was first planned in 1988 and stalled years later when Japan's official development assistance funds stepped in, the thirteen-station, 17.6-kilometer (10.9 mi) line was the third rapid transit line to be built in Metro Manila when it started operations in 2003. The line became the first rapid transit line extending outside Metro Manila after its extension to Antipolo in Rizal opened in 2021.

The line is integrated with the public transit system in Metro Manila, and passengers also take various forms of road-based public transport, such as buses and jeepneys, to and from a station to reach their intended destination. It is the least busy among Metro Manila's three rapid transit lines, with total ridership significantly below the line's built maximum capacity, serving about 140,000 passengers daily in 2023. Regardless, the line encounters periods of peak ridership during rush hour in the morning and the evening. Expanding the network's revenue line to accommodate more passengers is set on tackling this problem, with the most recent 2021 extension linking to Antipolo and approved plans of a three-station westbound extension in Manila.

== History ==
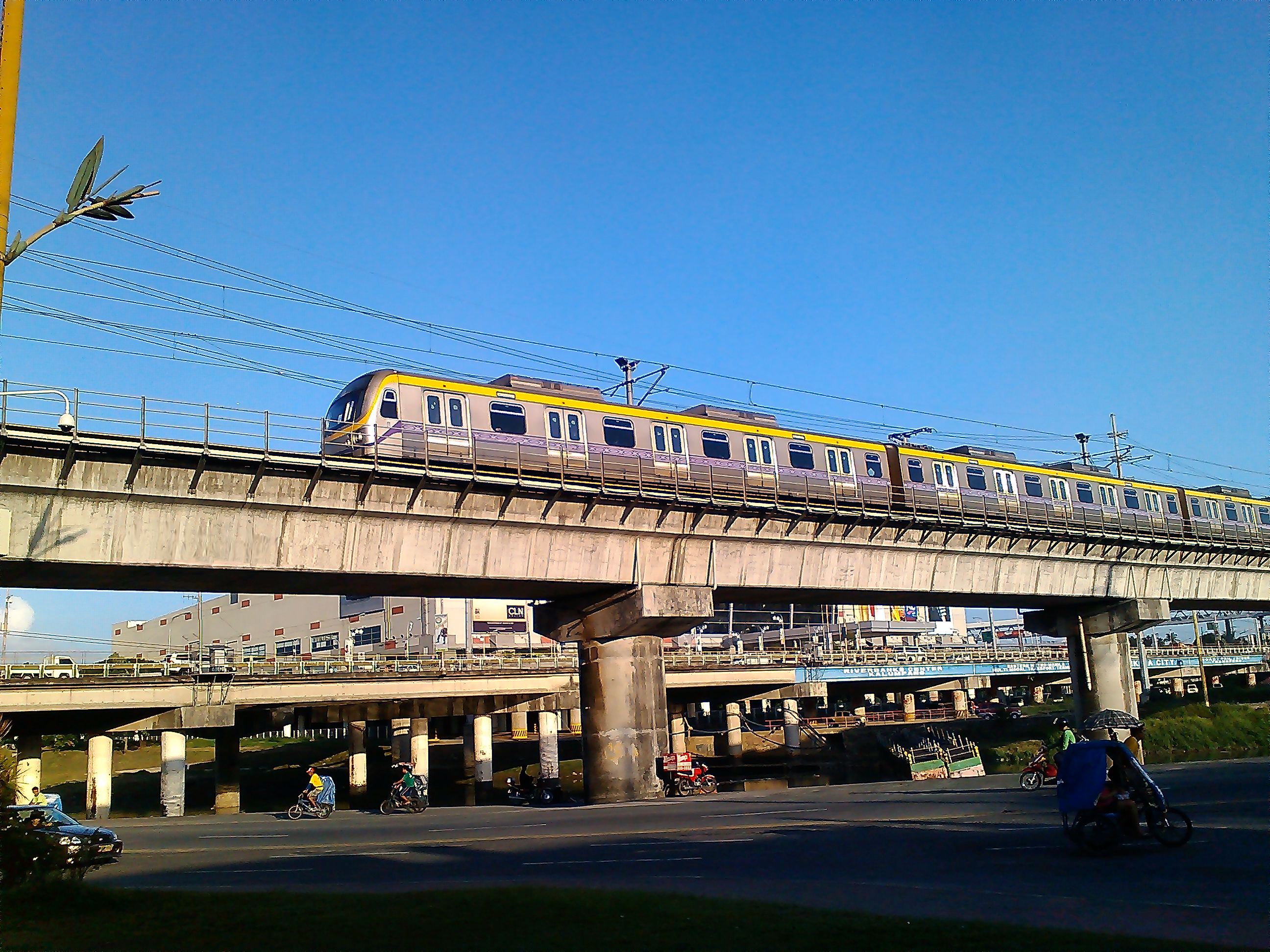
An eastbound train on the viaduct near Marikina River

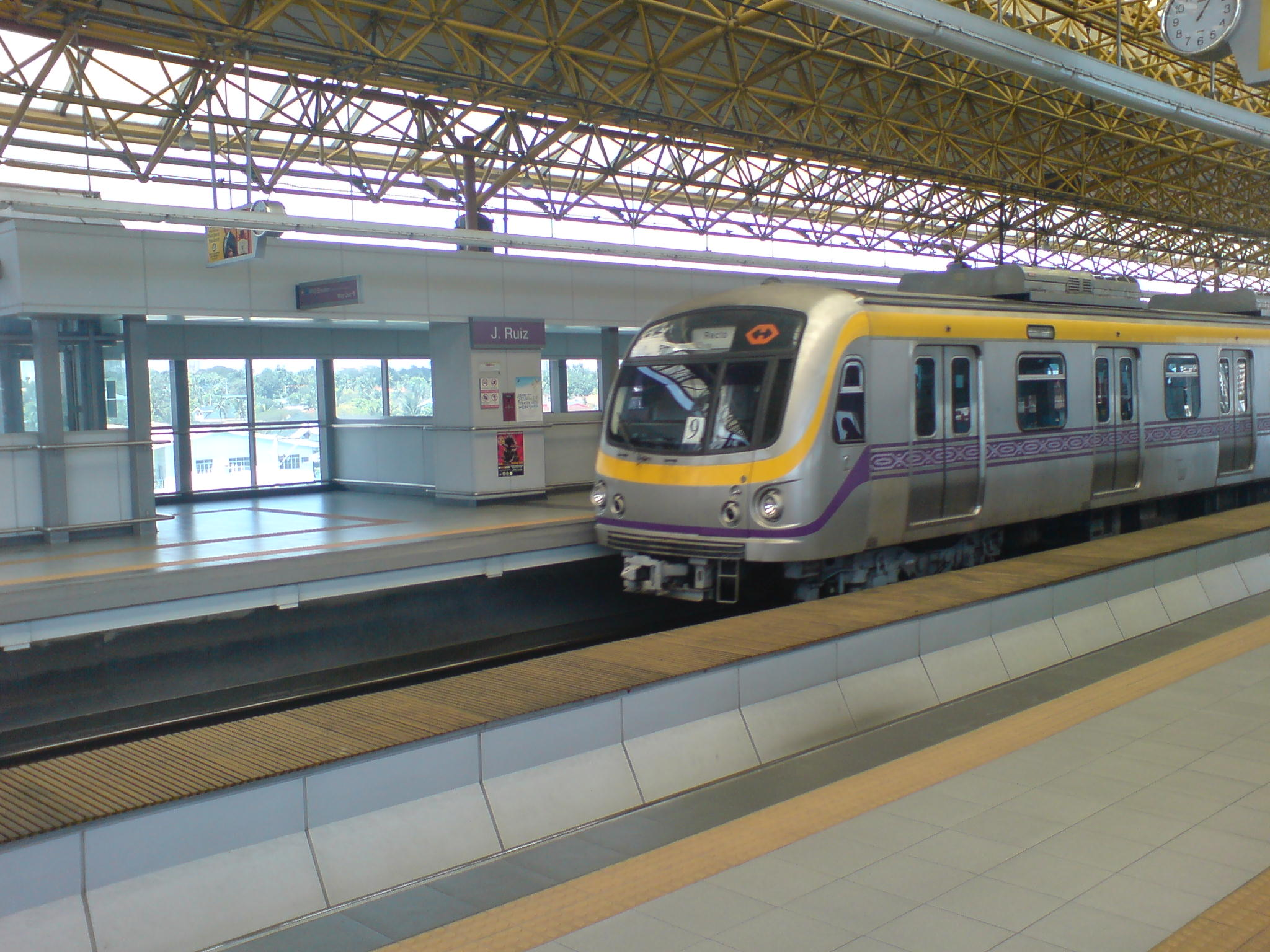
J. Ruiz station platform area

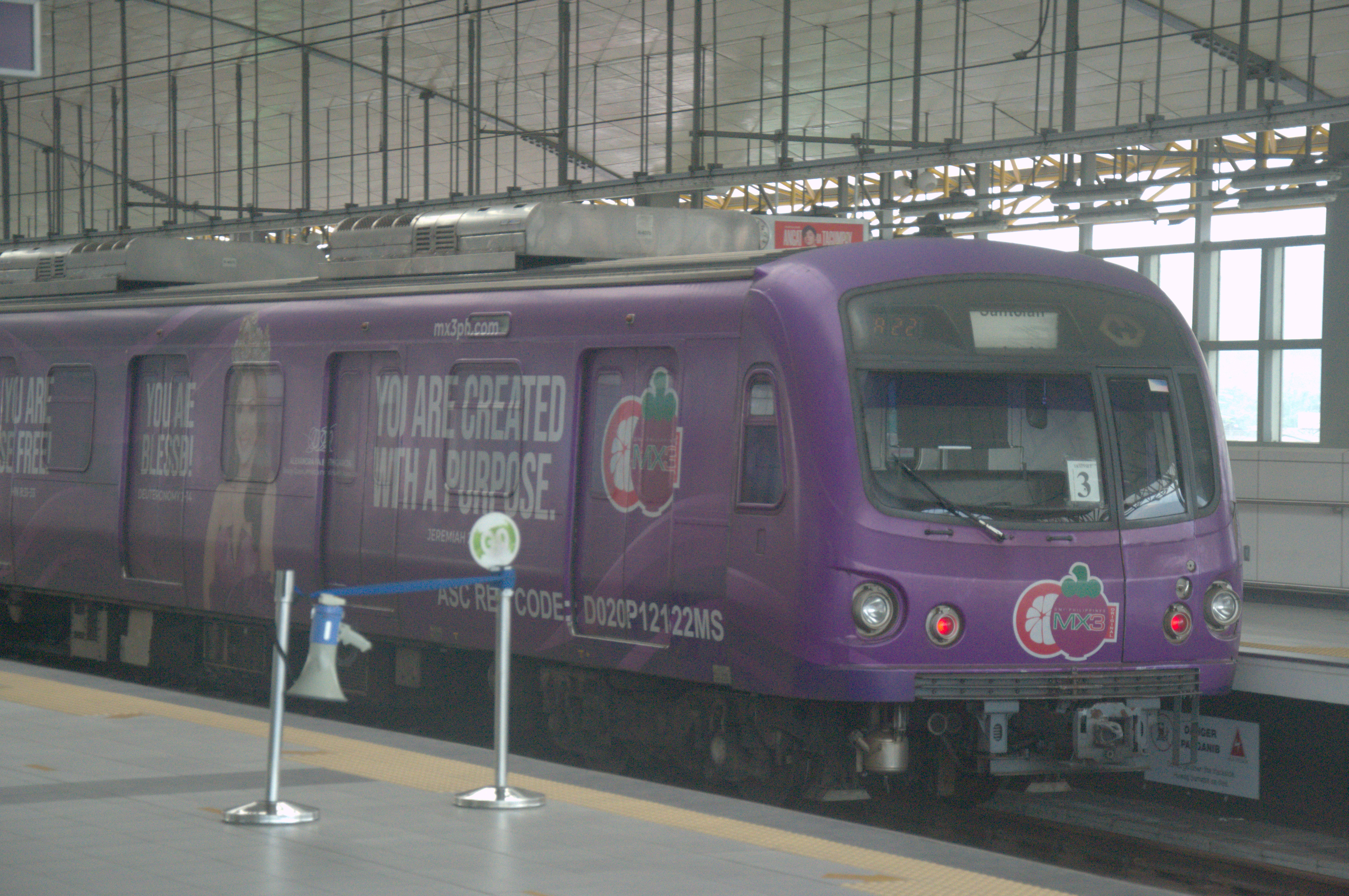
LRT-2 train with wrap advertisement

=== Planning and early delays ===
During the construction of the first line of the Manila Light Rail Transit System in the early 1980s, a Swiss company called Electrowatt Engineering Services designed a comprehensive plan for metro service in Metro Manila. The plan—still used as the basis for planning new metro lines—consisted of a 150-kilometer (93 mi) network of rapid transit lines spanning all major corridors within 20 years, including a line on the Radial Road 6 alignment, one of the region's busiest road corridor.

On March 16, 1988, the project was approved by the cabinet, and a feasibility study for the LRT Line 2, then called the MRT Line 2 project, that would connect Marikina to the City of Manila via Aurora Boulevard and Ramon Magsaysay Boulevard was carried out in the same year. Lavalin of Canada was interested in planning to build the line when the Philippine government would look to have a contract similar to the Bangkok system that was to be developed by the company (this was cancelled in 1992). The project was to be bid out as a build-operate-transfer project together with the LRT Line 1 capacity expansion project in 1989. In the same year, when President Corazon Aquino directed transportation secretary Rainerio Reyes to speed up the implementation of the line, the project was one of the 10 major infrastructure projects worth ₱8.7 billion.

Although sixteen firms were reported to have submitted bids for the line's construction, the bidding failed, causing delays. Only one consortium, made up of Japanese-European firms (Marubeni, Leighton, and Tractabel) and another Japanese firm, RRA International, attended the actual bidding. This means that the bidding for LRT 2 as a BOT project was unilaterally cancelled by transportation secretary Oscar Orbos, apparently in favor of a “ground-level” transit system.

Another feasibility study was conducted in 1991 with financing from the Overseas Economic Cooperation Fund (OECF). The final revised project was approved on December 13, 1995 as a separate project from the LRT-1 capacity expansion project. Early in 1994, the planned route was to run from Recto inside the Old Bilibid Prison to Katipunan, totaling 11.8 kilometers, but the actual route is 10 kilometers; the plan was also to have a depot located at the vacant site of Quezon Institute, and the plan was to have 26 2-car trains.

=== Construction and opening ===
The LRT Line 2 project officially began in 1996, twelve years after the opening of Line 1, with the granting of the official development assistance loans from the OECF, later known as the Japan Bank for International Cooperation (JBIC) for the line's construction starting in March of that year. The LRTA would have ownership of the system and assume all administrative functions, such as the regulation of fares and operations as well as the responsibility over construction and maintenance of the system and the procurement of spare parts for trains.

List of contractors (original 13.8-kilometer (8.6 mi) line)
Package no.	Scope of work	Contractor	Date of award	Notes
1	Depot	(Japan) Sumitomo Corporation	1997	Marshalling Yard was also constructed by Fujita.
2	Substructure	(South Korea) Hanjin (Japan) Itochu	1997	
3	Superstructure and stations	(South Korea) Hanjin (Japan) Itochu	1997	Rizzani de Eccher and its subsidiary, Deal S.r.l. of Italy, also designed and constructed the viaduct superstructure, including the provision of labor, precast and erection equipment, and engineering services.
4	Systems, vehicles (rolling stock), and trackwork	(Japan) Marubeni (United Kingdom) Balfour Beatty (Japan) Toshiba (South Korea) Daewoo Heavy Industries (now merged with Hyundai Rotem for the rolling stock division) (Philippines) DMCI	2000	Electronic systems package: Singapore Technologies Engineering (for the communications system, SCADA system, automatic fare collection system, and the management information system)

Construction started with a groundbreaking ceremony on November 15, 1997, after the LRTA signed the first three packages of the agreement with Sumitomo Corporation delivering Package 1 in which covers the construction of the depot and its facilities, while the Hanjin–Itochu joint venture delivered packages 2 and 3 in which covers the substructure and the superstructure plus the stations respectively.

The project suffered delays in 1998 when the fourth package of the project, which includes the communications and fares systems, vehicles, and trackworks, were alleged to be anomalous, according to Senator Juan Ponce Enrile. Although it was promptly corrected by the Estrada administration after it assumed power in the middle of that year, it encountered similar problems two years later. In April 2000, the National Economic and Development Authority (NEDA) met with officials from the Department of Transportation and Communications (DOTC). Out of the eight bidders, only two, Ansaldo; and Mitsui with Siemens, passed the technical evaluation process. To accommodate more bidders, especially that another two were disqualified, NEDA Secretary Felipe Medalla reportedly planned to lower the pre-qualification criteria from seventy percent to fifty percent, a move strongly opposed by the DOTC which reiterated that the seventy percent passing mark was only approved by the JBIC. However, Medalla reportedly justified his actions, saying that the JBIC was dissatisfied with the two qualified bidders and would stop all loans to the Philippines if more bidders were not added.

Finally, in September 2000, Package 4 was awarded to the Asia-Europe MRT Consortium (AEMC), a consortium led by Marubeni and composed of Balfour Beatty, Toshiba, Daewoo Heavy Industries, and a local company which was D.M. Consuji Incorporated (DMCI). AEMC, through Marubeni Corporation, entered into a contract with Singapore Technologies Engineering on December 12 of that year to supply and install the communications system, supervisory control and data acquisition (SCADA) system, automatic fare collection system, and the management information system. The consortium provided the eighteen four-car trainsets built by Rotem and Toshiba.

During construction, the LRTA, along with the project consultants oversaw all the design, construction, equipping, testing, commissioning, and technical supervision of the project activities. Halcrow was appointed in 1997 as the lead consultant for the project. The consultancy services were also provided by De Leuw Cather and the Japanese consultants Katahira & Engineers International and Tonichi Engineering for the civil engineering.

The pre-casting segmental method, a method used to launch girders and connect them to create a full span, was used in the construction of the original 13.8-kilometer (8.6 mi) line.

On April 5, 2003, President Gloria Macapagal Arroyo inaugurated the line, effectively opening the first 4.3 kilometers (2.7 mi) from Santolan to Araneta Center-Cubao. Accompanying the president were former president Corazon Aquino, Transportation Secretary Leandro Mendoza, LRTA chief Teddy Cruz Jr., and other officials, who were the first official passengers of the "Megatren". Fares were free of charge until April 9. All remaining stations opened on April 5, 2004, except for Recto which opened on the following October 29. However, ridership was initially moderate yet still far below expectations, since the passenger volume in this line is not yet fully achieved.

To address passenger complaints on the lack of universal access on earlier train lines, the LRTA made sure during the construction phase that the stations were equipped with universal access by putting up escalators and elevators for easier access, as well as making passenger fares at par with the other existing lines. However, while all stations have elevators to and from the platform, not all stations have elevators to and from the station concourse on both sides of the road.

=== Extension to Antipolo ===
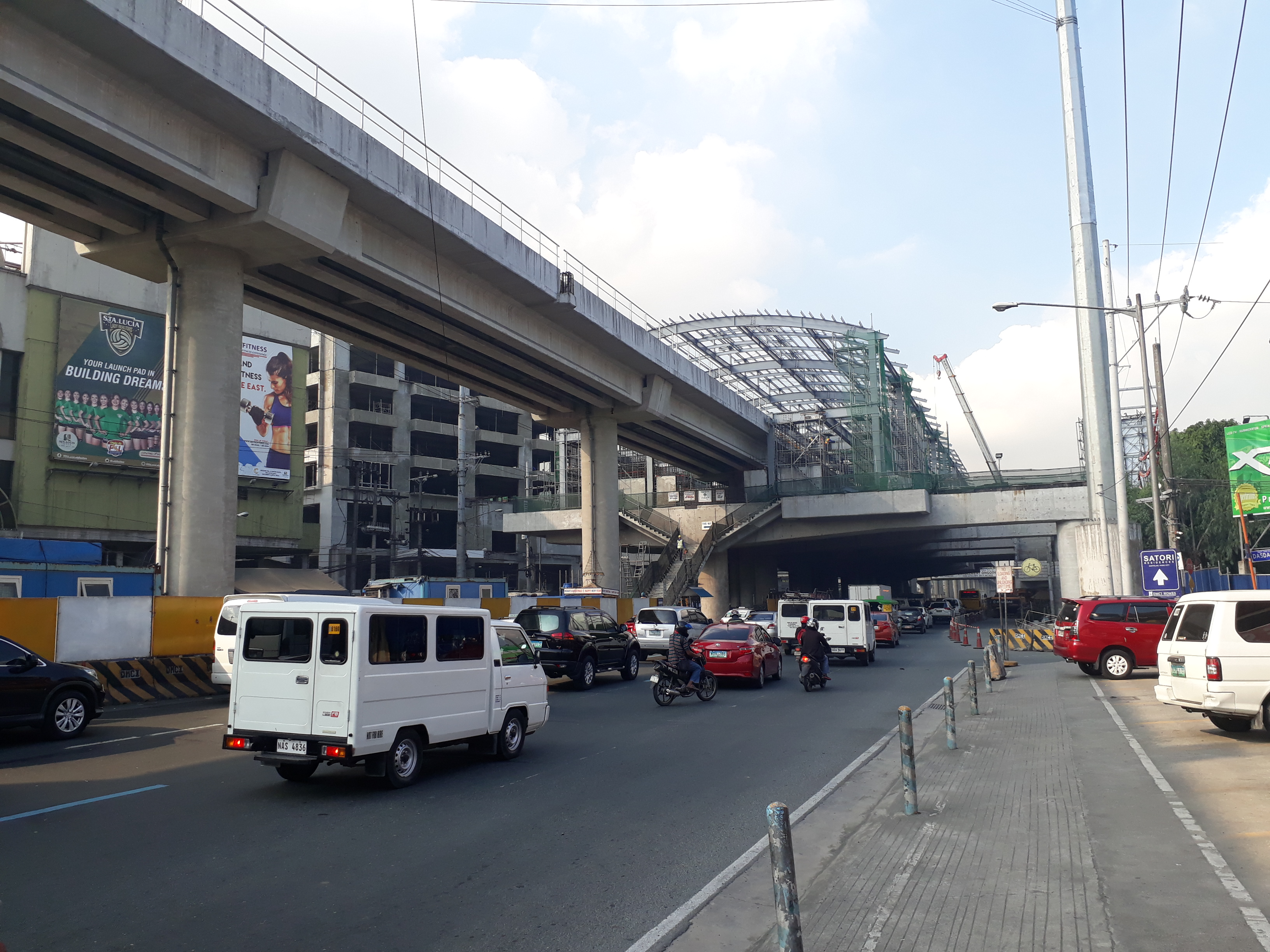
Construction of Marikina–Pasig station in December 2018

Plans to extend the line to Antipolo in the province of Rizal were first laid out in 1999 as part of the Metro Manila Urban Transportation Integration Study Master Plan by the Japan International Cooperation Agency (JICA). The MMUTIS study endorses the proposed expansion, which includes three stations, one of which was intended for the Vermont Royale Executive Village, but the proposal did not come to fruition.

The extension was first approved by the Investment Coordination Committee (ICC) board of the National Economic and Development Authority (NEDA) in October 2003. On August 3, 2006, the Light Rail Transit Authority (LRTA) announced its intention to extend the line eastward to Antipolo and westward to Port Area, Manila. In May 2011, LRTA secured commitments from the Philippine National Bank, Development Bank of the Philippines, and the Land Bank of the Philippines to fund the extension project. JICA then released a feasibility study report the following October. The 3.8-kilometer (2.4 mi) extension, starting from the eastern terminus of Santolan up to Antipolo station in Antipolo, called for two additional stations: Emerald (now Marikina–Pasig) in Marikina near Sta. Lucia Mall, Robinsons Metro East and Ayala Malls Feliz; and Masinag (now Antipolo), in Antipolo near SM City Masinag. The ₱9.7 billion project, at its current form, was approved by the National Economic and Development Authority chaired by then-President Benigno Aquino III on September 4, 2012. The Philippine national government funded the civil works contracts, while JICA funded the contract for the electrical and mechanical systems as part of its Capacity Enhancement of Mass Transit Systems in Metro Manila Project (CEMTSMMP) through a ¥43.2-billion loan for various projects of railway lines in Metro Manila. The project aimed to accommodate an additional 80,000 passengers and reduce traffic congestion along Marcos Highway. The lead consultant is a Korean consortium consisting of Foresight Development and Surveying, Soosung Engineering, and Korea Rail Network Authority.

The first two packages, awarded to D.M. Consunji Incorporated (DMCI), covered the design and construction of the viaduct and stations. Unlike the original line which used the pre-casting segmental method of construction, the east extension viaduct made use of AASHTO girders with a deck slab above the girders. Meanwhile, the third package, awarded to Marubeni and DMCI, covered the design and installation of the railway tracks and electrical and mechanical (E&M) systems of the extension. The project broke ground on June 9, 2015, with an original 2017 deadline. On May 30, 2017, another groundbreaking ceremony was held to mark the start of construction of the two stations. The final phase of construction, covering the installation of the tracks, electrical and mechanical systems, commenced on April 16, 2019. During construction, on March 10, 2017, a truck slammed in a concrete post of the east extension viaduct, killing one and injuring two.

List of contractors
Package no.	Scope of work	Contractor	Date of award
1.	Construction of the viaduct	(Philippines) DMCI	January 2015
2.	Construction of the stations	(Philippines) DMCI	June 2017
3.	Electrical and mechanical (E&M) systems	(Japan) Marubeni (Philippines) DMCI	March 2019

The initial 2017 deadline was not met, largely due to delays in the station's construction and the installation of the electrical and mechanical systems. It was repeatedly moved to 2020, before being delayed to 2021 due to the COVID-19 pandemic. Nevertheless, the extension was inaugurated by President Rodrigo Duterte on July 1, 2021, before formally opening four days later with free rides for two weeks.

In the following two months since its opening, a shuttle service was implemented between Antipolo and Santolan pending the completion of signaling integration, with one train running within the line's extension. This arrangement caused passenger complaints concerning its inefficiency, which was further exacerbated by the lack of operational trains. Seamless end-to-end services were initially expected to begin within two weeks after opening, but only started two months later on September 3, after integration works were completed. (Note: The date when the end-to-end operations between Antipolo and Recto and vice versa began varies per source. According to LRTA, it began on September 3, 2021. Meanwhile, some news outlets state that end-to-end services begun on September 7.)

== Route ==
Route of LRT Line 2

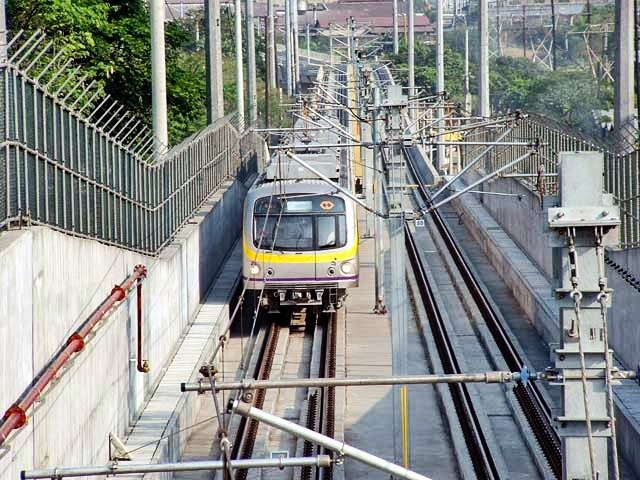
A train approaching Katipunan

The rail line serves the cities that Radial Road 6 passes through: Manila, San Juan, Quezon City, Marikina, Pasig (depot), and Antipolo. The rails are mostly elevated and erected either over or along the roads covered, with sections below ground before and after the Katipunan station, the only underground station on the line.

=== Stations ===
The line serves 13 stations along its 17.6-kilometer (10.9 mi)-route. The western terminus of the line is the Recto station at Recto Avenue, while the eastern terminus of the line is the Antipolo station along Marikina–Infanta Highway.

Three stations serve as connecting stations between other lines in the metro. Pureza is within walking distance to the Santa Mesa station of the PNR Metro Commuter Line; Araneta Center–Cubao is indirectly connected to the station of the same name on the MRT Line 3 through local streets and inter-connected mall passageways inside Araneta City; and Recto is indirectly connected to the Doroteo Jose station of the LRT Line 1 through a covered walkway. No stations are connected to other rapid transit lines within the paid areas.

LRT Line 2 stations timeline
Date opened	Project	Stations
April 5, 2003	Phase 1	Araneta Center–Cubao – Santolan
April 5, 2004	Phase 2	Legarda – Betty Go-Belmonte
October 29, 2004	Phase 2	Recto
July 5, 2021	East Extension	Marikina–Pasig – Antipolo

Legend
†	Existing terminus
†	Future terminus

List of stations
Station Code	Station Name	Distance (km)		Connections	Location
Station Code	Station Name	Between stations	Total	Connections	Location
PW03	Pier 4 †	—	—	Ferry services: North Port Passenger Terminal; Bus routes: 35 Recto; 22 44 45 46 47 Manila Northport	Manila
PW02	Divisoria	—	—		Manila
PW01	Tutuban	—	—	PNR: NSCR Tutuban; Bus routes: 8 PNR 1 PNR 2 Divisoria	Manila
PL01	Recto †			Manila LRT: Doroteo Jose; Bus routes: 13 19 20 21 42 Avenida/Recto	Manila
PL02	Legarda	1.050		Bus routes: 2 3 Legarda	Manila
PL03	Pureza	1.389		PNR: Santa Mesa; Bus routes: 2 3 Pureza; Pasig River Ferry Service: PUP Ferry Station	Manila
PL04	V. Mapa	1.357		Bus routes: 2 3 SM City Sta. Mesa	Manila
PL05	J. Ruiz	1.234		Bus routes: 3 J. Ruiz	San Juan
PL06	Gilmore	0.928		Bus routes: 3 Gilmore; Quezon City Bus Service: 6 Robinsons Magnolia	Quezon City
PL07	Betty Go-Belmonte	1.075		Bus routes: 3 Betty Go-Belmonte	Quezon City
PL08	Araneta Center–Cubao	1.164		Manila MRT: Araneta Center–Cubao; Bus routes: 3 Gateway Mall; 51 53 61 Farmers Plaza; Quezon City Bus Service: 1 Araneta City	Quezon City
PL09	Anonas	1.438		Manila MRT: MMS Anonas; Bus routes: 3 51 Anonas; Quezon City Bus Service: 3 Anonas	Quezon City
PL10	Katipunan	0.955		Bus routes: 3 Katipunan; 18 36 39 41 50 51 56 Aurora Boulevard; Quezon City Bus Service: 3 Katipunan Interchange; 7 Katipunan Interchange	Quezon City
PL11	Santolan	1.970		Bus routes: 3 56 SM Marikina	Marikina / Pasig
PL12	Marikina–Pasig	1.795		Bus routes: 3 56 Robinsons Metro East	Marikina / Pasig
PL13	Antipolo †	2.232		Bus routes: 3 56 SM Masinag	Antipolo, Rizal
PL14	SM Cherry Antipolo	—	—		Antipolo, Rizal
PL15	Blue Mountains	—	—		Antipolo, Rizal
PL16	Cogeo †	—	—		Antipolo, Rizal
Stations, lines, and/or other transport connections in italics are either under construction, proposed, unopened, or have been closed.

=== Operations ===
The line currently runs from 5:00 a.m. PST (UTC+8) until 9:30 p.m. on a daily basis. It operates almost every day of the year unless otherwise announced. Special schedules are announced via the PA system at every station and also in newspapers and other mass media. During Holy Week, a public holiday in the Philippines, the rail system is closed for annual maintenance, owing to fewer commuters and traffic around the metro. Normal operation resumes after Easter Sunday. During the Christmas and year-end holidays, the operating hours of the line are modified and shortened, due to the low ridership of the line during the holidays.

== Station facilities, amenities, and services ==
Santolan station, the only station on the line with an island platform.

The entrance to Santolan station as seen from the Marcos Highway

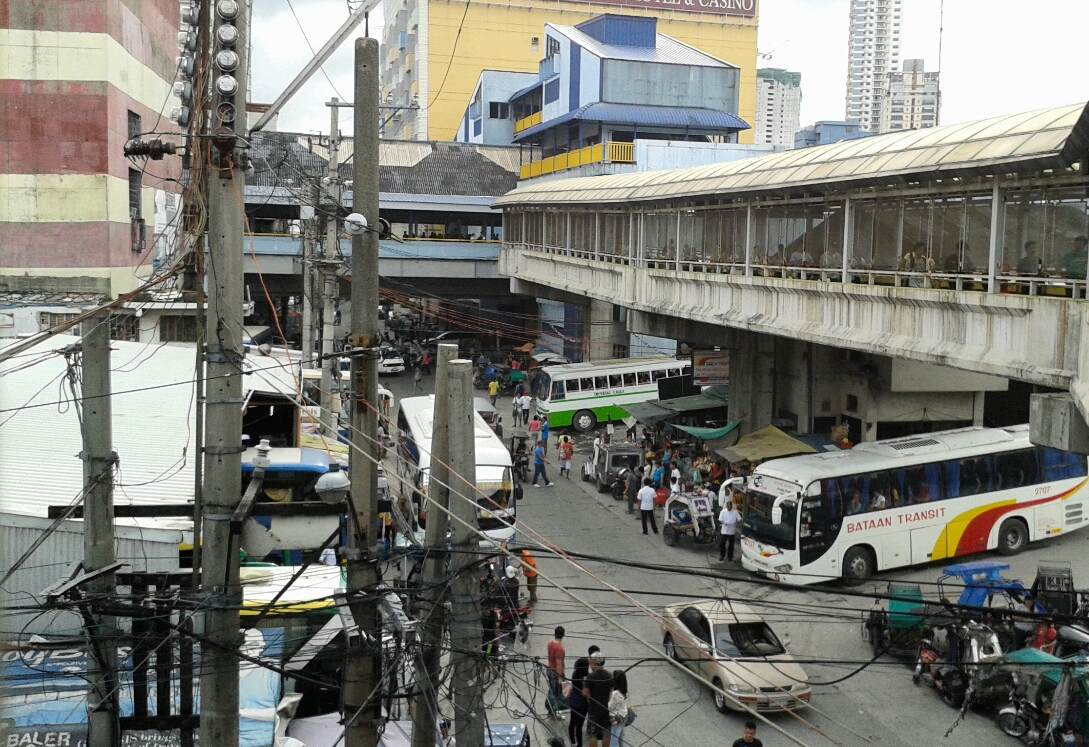
Bridge linking the Recto to the nearby Doroteo Jose

=== Station layout and accessibility ===
Stations in the line are located above ground, except for Katipunan, which is located underground. Stations have a standard layout, with a concourse level and a platform level. The concourse contains ticket booths and is usually below the platform except for the underground station, with stairs, escalators and elevators leading down to the platform level. The levels are separated by fare gates. All stations are barrier-free inside and outside the station, and trains have spaces for passengers using wheelchairs.

Most station platforms are 100 meters (330 ft) long and 3.5 to 4.5 meters (11 to 15 ft) wide, with some stations having a length of 120 to 150 meters (390 to 490 ft). All stations have side platforms, with the exception of Santolan, which as an island platform. Part of the platform at the front of the train is cordoned off for the use of pregnant women, children, elderly, and persons with disabilities. At side-platform stations, passengers are able to switch platforms at the concourse level without leaving the closed system, while passengers can easily switch sides at stations with island platforms. Stations have toilets at the concourse level, both inside and outside the closed system.

All Line 2 stations have segregated public restrooms as well as at least one restroom for persons with disability at each station.

Folding bicycles are allowed to be brought into trains provided that it does not exceed the LRTA's baggage size limitations of 2 by 2 feet (20 by 20 in). The last car of each train is also designated as "green zones", where folding bicycle users can ride with their bikes.

The line has a total of 72 escalators and 40 elevators across all 13 stations. However, by 2021, only a few elevators and escalators remain operational due to anomalies and corruption involving the procurement contracts, causing complaints from passengers. The elevators and escalators are being repaired and restored since 2022, and more are being repaired and restored as of April 2022.

=== Shops and services ===
Stations have at least one stall or stand where people can buy food or drinks, which vary by station. Stations such as Recto (Isetann Cinerama Recto), V. Mapa (SM City Sta. Mesa), Gilmore (Robinsons Magnolia), Araneta Center—Cubao (Ali Mall, Farmers Plaza, Gateway Mall, Isetann Cubao, and SM Araneta City) being a primary interchange with MRT-3, Santolan (SM City Marikina), Marikina—Pasig (Robinsons Metro East, Ayala Malls Feliz and Sta. Lucia East Grandmall), and Antipolo (SM City Masinag) are connected to or are near shopping malls and/or other large shopping areas, where commuters are offered more shopping varieties.

It is also accessible to major transport terminals in Metro Manila such as Avenida Bus Terminal via Recto and Araneta City Bus Port via Araneta Center—Cubao.

Since November 19, 2001, in cooperation with the Philippine Daily Inquirer, passengers have been offered copies of the Inquirer Libre, a free, tabloid-size, Tagalog version of the Inquirer, which is available at all stations.

== Ridership ==
The line is designed and was forecasted to carry 570,000 passengers daily. However, the line operates under its designed capacity since its opening, government officials have admitted that system extensions are overdue, although in the absence of major investment in the system's expansion, LRTA has resorted to experimenting with and/or implementing other solutions to maximize the use of the system, including having bus feeder lines. On October 3, 2014, the line recorded its highest total average of daily passengers, where the ridership within the day reached 281,231 passengers.

Before the pandemic, the line had a ridership of 200,000 passengers, but soon decreased in 2019 due to lack of trains and a power trip that closed three stations in October 2019 that was reopened in January 2021. The line served 33,267 passengers daily on average in 2021, with eight trains available for revenue service running at an operating speed of 60 kilometers per hour (37 mph) in ten-minute intervals, and one train in reserve for rush hour services, which cuts the time intervals to a minimum of eight minutes. Since 2022, with the return of onsite schooling, ridership has steadily increased, and has returned to pre-COVID-19 pandemic levels in 2025. On August 25, 2026, the line has recorded its highest passenger ridership count in 9 years since 2017, as the line served around 250,578 passengers, which is short of the 2017 record of 251,646 passengers.

=== Statistics ===
View chart definition.
View chart definition.

Year	Daily Average (% change)	Yearly Total (% change)
2003	9,221	2.36 million
2004	▲61,337 (▲565.19%)	▲23.03 million (▲875.85%)
2005	▲116,082 (▲89.25%)	▲41.90 million (▲81.94%)
2006	▲132,154 (▲13.85%)	▲47.57 million (▲13.53%)
2007	▲147,032 (▲11.26%)	▲52.93 million (▲11.27%)
2008	▲161,846 (▲10.08%)	▲58.59 million (▲10.69%)
2009	▲171,996 (▲6.27%)	▲62.09 million (▲5.97%)
2010	▲175,501 (▲2.04%)	▲63.36 million (▲2.05%)
2011	▲176,818 (▲0.75%)	▲63.81 million (▲0.71%)
2012	▲194,268 (▲9.87%)	▲70.33 million (▲10.22%)
2013	▲197,924 (▲1.88%)	▲71.45 million (▲1.59%)
2014	▲201,794 (▲1.96%)	▲72.85 million (▲1.96%)
2015	▼172,318 (▼14.61%)	▼62.21 million (▼14.61%)
2016	▲185,071 (▲7.40%)	▲67.00 million (▲7.70%)
2017	▼182,708 (▼1.28%)	▼65.96 million (▼1.55%)
2018	▼177,260 (▼3.01%)	▼64.70 million (▼1.91%)
2019	▼156,110 (▼11.93%)	▼56.98 million (▼11.93%)
2020	▼45,463 (▼70.88%)	▼12.50 million (▼78.06%)
2021	▼33,267 (▼26.83%)	▼11.84 million (▼5.28%)
2022	▲88,597 (▲166.32%)	▲31.63 million (▲167.15%)
2023	▲138,455 (▲56.28%)	▲49.42 million (▲56.24%)
2024	▲147,618 (▲6.62%)	▲53.29 million (▲7.83%)
2025	▲162,742 (▲10.25%)	▲58.75 million (▲10.25%)

== Rolling stock ==
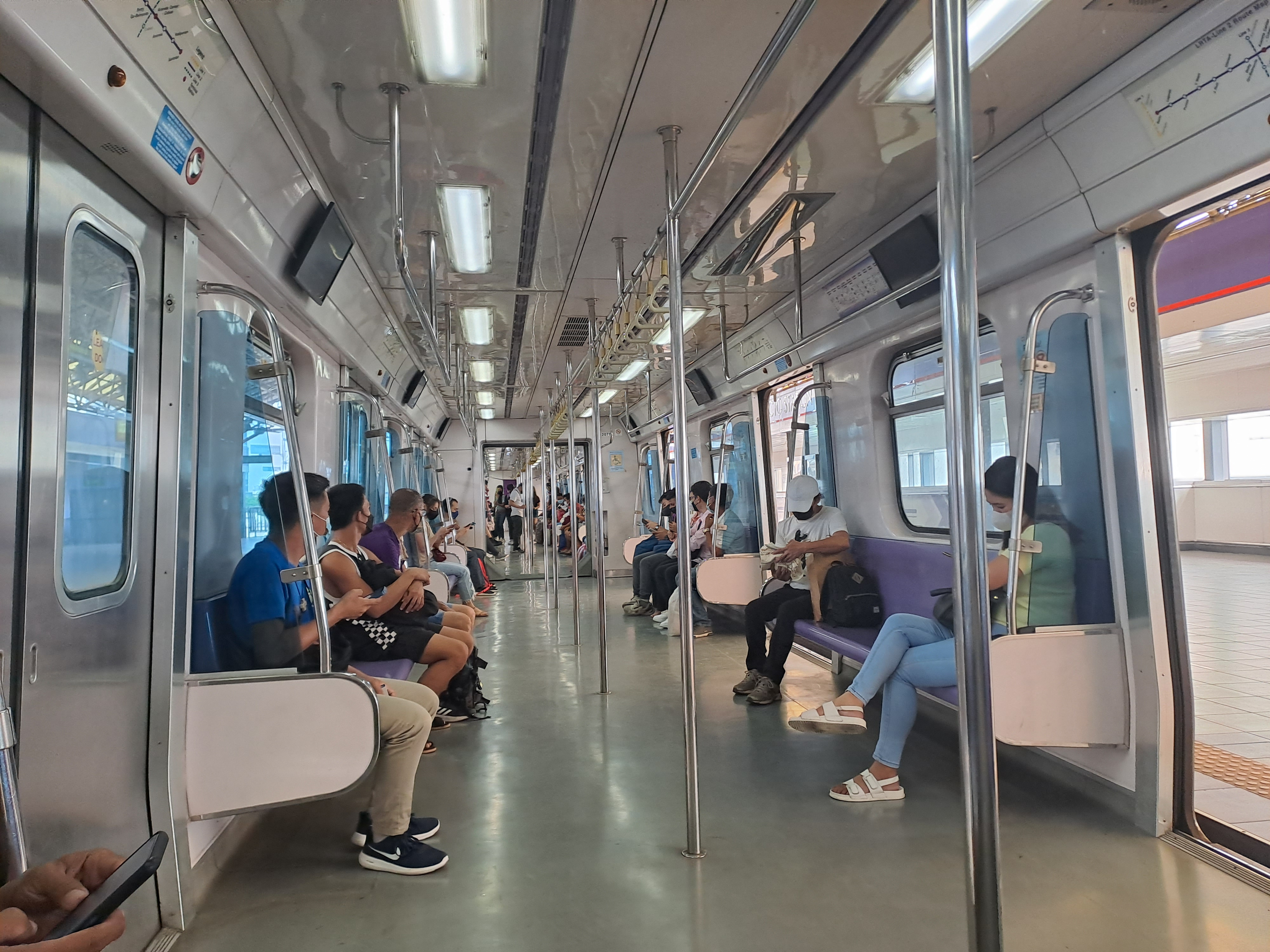
Interior of a 2000 class train

The line runs sixteen electric multiple units made in South Korea by Hyundai Rotem powered by Toshiba-made VVVF inverters. The trains came in together with the fourth package during the system's construction. The four-car trains have a capacity of 1,628 passengers, which is more than the normal capacity of the rolling stock of Lines 1 and 3. These trains also prominently use wrap advertising.

The trains have a maximum design speed of 80 kilometers per hour (50 mph) with typical operating speeds ranging from 45 to 60 kilometers per hour (28 to 37 mph) under normal conditions. Some sections of the line however, encounter speed restrictions due to technical issues and ongoing maintenance activities.

In 2017, the entire train fleet was retrofitted with the TUBE (formerly known as PARDS), a passenger information system powered by LCD screens installed near the ceiling of the train that shows news, advertisements, current train location, arrivals and station layouts.

In 2019, the train ventilation was upgraded to replace the aging air-conditioning units and to alleviate complaints of the commuters for uncomfortable hot rides. Two years later, three train sets underwent refurbishment and resulted in new fitted propulsion systems and train monitoring systems from Woojin Industrial Systems.

The LRTA is also acquiring 14 additional train sets by 2020 to augment the existing 18 sets, due to the expected increase of passengers ahead of the East Extension, and the West Extension. The purchase however was delayed to 2022. No updates were made as of 2024.

Included in the design-and-build contract of the west extension is the procurement of five four-car train sets.

=== Depot ===
The line maintains an at-grade depot in Barangay Santolan in Pasig, near Santolan station in the side of Barangay Calumpang in Marikina. The depot occupies approximately 10 hectares (25 acres) of space and serves as the headquarters for light and heavy maintenance. Due to its location in a flood-prone area, the depot was raised 2 meters (6.6 ft) above ground level. It is connected to the mainline network by a spur line.

The depot is capable of storing 24 sets of electric multiple units, with the option to expand to include more vehicles as demand arises. They are parked on several sets of tracks, which converge onto the spur route and later on to the main network.

There are eight decommissioned 1000 class and one set of 1100 class trains formerly used in LRT Line 1 being stored in this depot due to the non-availability of stabling tracks to store the new 13000 class trains at the Line 1 depot in Parañaque.

== Other infrastructure ==
=== Signaling ===
The line uses a fixed block system with automatic train control (ATC), which has three subsystems: automatic train protection (ATP), automatic train operation (ATO), and Rail9000 automatic train supervision (ATS). The ATO subsystem automatically drives the trains, while the opening and closing of doors is controlled by an onboard train attendant. The ATP system, meanwhile, maintains safe operations and monitors the train's speed. Lastly, the Rail9000 ATS system is located at the operations control center at the line's Santolan Depot, which directs train operations and monitors the train movement along the line. Other components of the signaling system includes train detection through track circuits and Westrace MK1 computer-based interlocking.

The signaling equipment were manufactured by Westinghouse Signals (later Westinghouse Rail Systems, acquired by Siemens in 2013).

The signaling system was upgraded with the replacement of its communication link and the upgrading of the Westrace interlocking module. The project started on February 15, 2022, and was completed on March 29.

=== Tracks ===
The rails are 54-kilogram-per-meter (36 lb/ft) rails designed to the UIC 54 rail profile. The rails are supported by concrete plinths.

== Plans and proposals ==
=== West extension ===
A 3.02-kilometer (1.88 mi) extension of the line to the Manila North Harbor in Tondo has been proposed. It was first announced in August 2006, when the LRTA announced the then-proposed east and west extensions, and was approved by the National Economic and Development Authority (NEDA) on May 19, 2015. The construction of this extension would create three stations, one near the Tutuban PNR station, one in Divisoria, and one near the North Port Passenger Terminal in Manila North Harbor's Pier 4 which would serve as its terminus. In an interview, LRTA Administrator Ret. Gen. Reynaldo Berroya stated that they are aiming to finish the project by 2022 to 2023. The project is now expected to start construction in 2025.

The total project cost is estimated to be ₱10.12 billion. In 2019, WESTRAX Joint Venture was awarded the contract for the consultancy services for the project.

In October 2019, the project was under bidding process, consisting of 3 stations, Tutuban, Divisoria, and Pier 4, with the project scheduled to be completed by 2024.

On August 27, 2020, the Light Rail Transit Authority published the bidding documents for the design-and-build contract for the west extension. According to the documents, the turn back area after the Pier 4 station will have three tracks; two of which are the main tracks and one serves as a pocket track. The three stations will feature side platforms.

The project was originally planned to be funded through a public-private partnership (PPP) scheme, in line with the Marcos administration's policy to use the said scheme to complete various infrastructure projects. The contract would have also covered the procurement of five new four-car trains, along with the maintenance of the line and the refurbishment of the trains. However, it was decided that the government will instead fund the project through the national budget.

In January 2025, LRTA stated that the process of right of way acquisition for the West Extension is now underway.

=== Second Antipolo extension ===
Plans for the extension to Cogeo were mentioned in 1992. The Japan International Cooperation Agency (JICA) has also proposed for a second phase of the east extension to extend the line to Cogeo and downtown Antipolo. There are provisions at the end of the current rail line at Antipolo station for an extension. Two proposals were presented by JICA: a 3-kilometer (1.9 mi), one-station underground extension, and a 6-kilometer (3.7 mi), five-station extension, both originating from Antipolo station. As of February 2025, the feasibility study is nearing its conclusion. The extension would have three stations and the alignment is still being finalized.

=== Privatization ===
The privatization of the operations and maintenance of Line 2 was planned by the then-Department of Transportation and Communications (DOTC; later the Department of Transportation) as part of the agency's improvement and modernization of the railway lines in the Philippines. The bidding process for this project begun on September 13, 2014. In this project, the interested companies were required to submit pre-qualification documents and submit a bid proposal if the company is qualified for the bidding. In January 2015, four companies submitted pre-qualification documents for the project. The bidders included Aboitiz Equity Ventures with SMRT Transport Solutions (Aboitiz Equity Ventures and SMRT International Pte Ltd. through SMRT Trains), DMCI Holdings with Tokyo Metro, Light Rail Manila 2 Consortium (RATP and Metro Pacific), and San Miguel Corporation with Korea Railroad Corporation. All bidders were pre-qualified for the bidding. However, the project would eventually be shelved in 2016.

In 2017, it was reported that the Metro Pacific Investments Corporation was interested in a possible auction for the privatization of the line. The plan to privatize the operations and maintenance of the line was restarted in October 2019, following a power trip that damaged two rectifiers. Since then, no new reports have surfaced about this plan as of 2021.

=== Capacity expansion and upgrade ===
Due to the aging of the line, a capacity expansion project for the line was announced in April 2022. The project would include upgrades to the trains, signaling, telecommunications, power supply, overhead systems, railway tracks, and other system equipment. The project is still under the stages of the procurement of a consultant for the project, which would assess the current condition of the line.

TÜV Rheinland has been shortlisted for the list of consultants and is the only consultant to be shortlisted in June 2022.

Like the west extension, the upgrading of the train cars would be funded through a public-private partnership scheme. The contract would also cover the maintenance of the line and the construction of the west extension.

== Incidents ==
- On July 12, 2006, at 7:30 AM, lightning struck the power cables near the Santolan station, interrupting train operations.
- On August 15, 2006, at 8:45 AM, lightning struck the power cables, which is the second incident reported in a month. Normal operations were restored before 12:00 noon.
- On May 20, 2008, at 6:45 PM, lightning struck the line's power supply, interrupting operations.
- On July 23, 2008, a power interruption disrupted the line operations, leaving the Santolan-Cubao section only operational.
- On June 11, 2011, a man was severely injured after jumping in front of a moving train at the Araneta Center–Cubao station. This forced the line operations to be suspended.
- On May 9, 2017, at 4:03 PM, a tree fell to the tracks at the Anonas area, causing the line's operations to be disrupted and a 2000 class train nearby was hit. The Department of Public Works and Highways local office was doing roadworks at the site of the incident when they accidentally hit a tree that fell on the tracks. Partial operations between Recto and V. Mapa were implemented, until the line's operations were suspended an hour later. The incident area was cleared and full operations resumed at 7:41 PM.
- On May 30, 2018, a damaged cable between J. Ruiz and V. Mapa stations caused limited operations between Santolan and Araneta Center–Cubao stations at 11:46 AM. Normal operations resumed at 7:46 PM.
- On May 18, 2019, two trains collided between Anonas and Cubao stations, injuring 34 passengers, with none in critical condition. Revenue operations were suspended to give way to maintenance checks, and normal operations resumed at 10:47 AM the next day. Trainset no. 18 returned to service in June 2021, while Trainset no. 13 returned to service in September 2021.
- On October 2, 2019, at 9:43 am, lightning struck the Gilmore station, causing the power transformers at the J. Ruiz and Araneta Center–Cubao stations to trip and disrupt the power supply. The operations of the line were suspended for safety checks and normal operations resumed at 10:11 AM.
- On October 3, 2019, another power trip caused rectifier substations located between Anonas and Katipunan stations and in the Santolan depot to catch fire at around 11 AM, cutting the line's power supply in the area. Line operations from Recto to Santolan were suspended at 11:24 am, and passengers were evacuated from the line with no injuries. The LRTA, MMDA and the Philippine Coast Guard immediately deployed shuttle buses to help ferry stranded passengers. Partial operations between Cubao and Recto stations resumed on October 8, 2019. The initial estimated amount of damages is at around PHP428 million. Santolan, Katipunan and Anonas stations reopened following multiple delays on January 22, 2021.
- On October 8, 2020, a fire broke out in the electrical room at Santolan causing the operations to be suspended at 5:10 AM. The fire damaged the station's uninterruptible power supply. Normal operations returned a few hours later.
- On April 7, 2021, the operations of the LRT-2 were halted due to an unspecified "technical problem." Normal operations resumed at 10:50 AM.
- On May 24, 2021, an unspecified technical problem at Santolan station limited the LRT-2 operations between Recto and Araneta Cubao stations. Full operations resumed the following day.
- On June 17, 2021, a technical problem at the line's control center halted the LRT-2 operations. Normal operations resumed at 4:59pm.
- On August 16, 2021, operations were suspended between Cubao and Santolan due to an unspecified technical problem. Operations resumed at 4:20pm.
- On September 17, 2021, a defective catenary wire at the east extension area caused disruptions in operations. A shuttle service between Santolan and Antipolo was implemented at 9:43 AM. On the same day, the line's operations were briefly suspended at 11:36 AM after a tangled t-shirt was seen hanging at the contact wires between Cubao and Anonas stations. Operations with the shuttle service resumed at 11:49 AM, while full end-to-end operations were known to be resumed the following day.
- On October 9, 2021, an entangled balloon was discovered between V. Mapa and Pureza stations, causing the line's operations to be suspended for 30 minutes.
- On November 3, 2021, operations of Line 2 were suspended at 6:00 AM due to a signaling system problem. Operations resumed at 7:57 AM.
- Multiple signaling system problems were reported on November 6, 14, and 25, 2021.
- On July 31, 2022, at 8:00 a.m., operations of Line 2 were limited from Cubao to Antipolo stations due to a broken catenary wire between Legarda and Pureza stations. Full operations resumed the following day at 5:00 a.m.
- On May 14, 2023, at 5:30 AM, operations of Line 2 were limited from V. Mapa to Antipolo stations due to a fire that broke out in the vicinity of Recto station, affecting the power supply and signaling system up to Pureza station. The fire was declared under control at 6:40 AM and line operations returned to normal at 1:15 PM.
- On January 12, 2024, Line 2 operations from Antipolo to Recto was halted by one hour due to technical problems with its power rectifier on the LRT-2 substation. Normal operation service resumed after an hour.
- On August 17, 2024, a street dweller was spotted in between Pureza and Legarda stations. The situation forced to limit services from Antipolo to V. Mapa for a few hours.
- On August 19, 2024, a catenary cable caught fire between Katipunan and Santolan stations. This led the line's operations to be limited from Recto to Cubao until the next morning.
- On September 11, 2024, a power supply problem halted operations between V. Mapa and Recto stations for five hours.
- On September 12, 2024, a damaged pantograph on a 2000 class train at J. Ruiz station caused a brief halt on operations.
- On January 17, 2025, a train broke down, forcing commuters to ride other types of transport. This led to a "half-line" operation from 5:00 AM to 9:00 AM wherein the line would operate from Recto to Araneta Center–Cubao.
- On September 15, 2025, around 11:00pm, a 2000 class train derailed whilst arriving at Santolan station, causing damage to the both train and the tracks which resulted in limited operations between Recto station and Araneta Center–Cubao station until the following day.
- On September 23, 2026, around 3:00PM, a lightning strike damaged a catenary wire outside antipolo station halting train operations. Initially, trains only ran from Recto station to Araneta-Center Cubao station. But, at 3:44PM, trains were permitted to continue up to Santolan Station making the provisionary service run from Recto station to Santolan station. The damaged catenary wire at Antipolo station was repaired at 10:38PM, 1 hour later after the last train arrived in santolan station. Normal operations resumed the following day.
