= Legarda station =

LRT Line 2 station in Sampaloc, Manila

Legarda
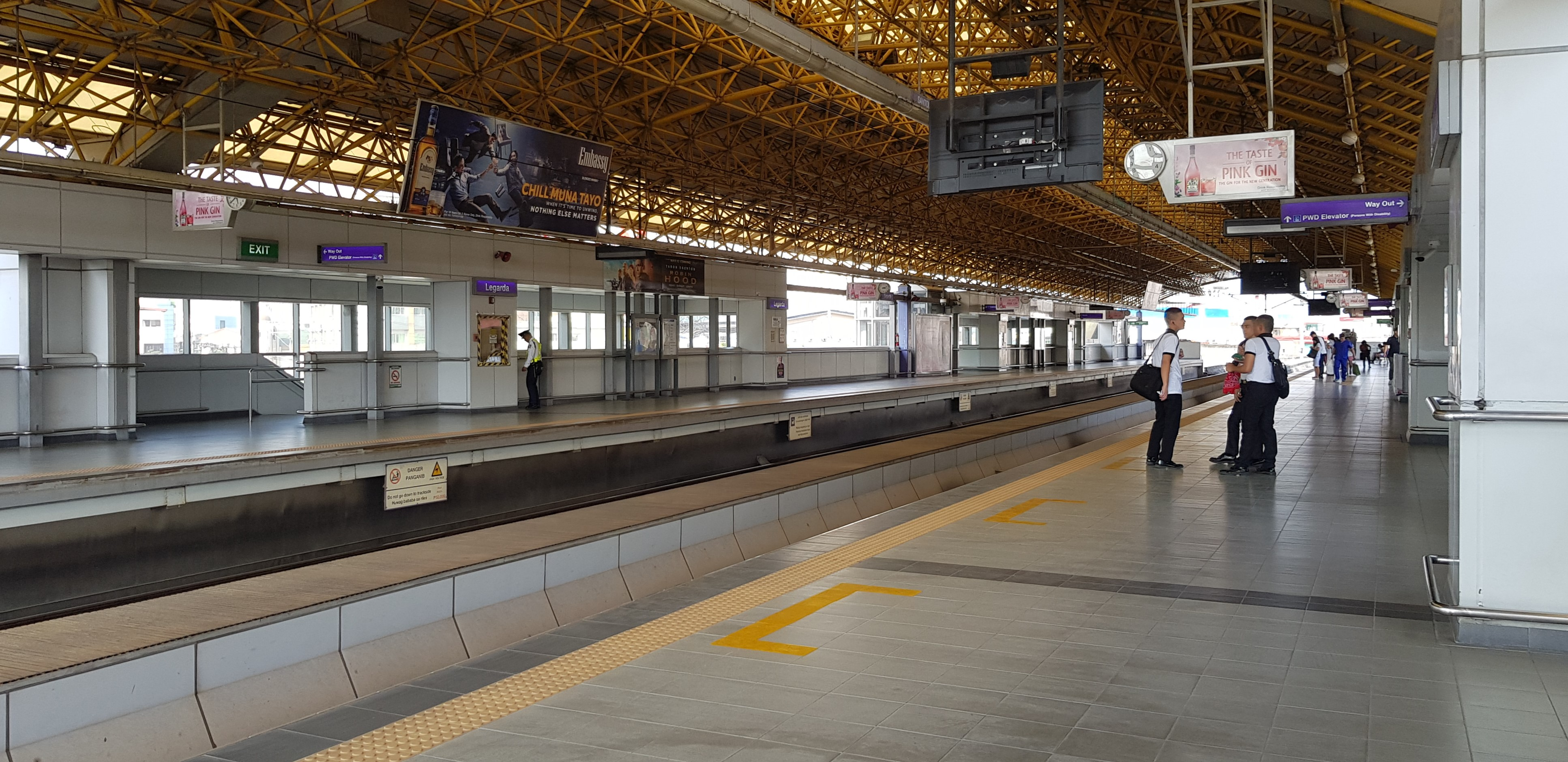

General information
- Location: Legarda Street, Sampaloc; Manila, Metro Manila; Philippines
- Coordinates: 14°36′03.06″N 120°59′33.69″E
- Owner: Department of Transportation; Light Rail Transit Authority
- Line: LRT Line 2
- Platforms: 2 (2 side)
- Tracks: 2
- Connections: 2 (Angono - Quiapo) 3 (Antipolo - Quiapo)

Construction
- Structure type: Elevated
- Parking: Yes (Mendiola Street)
- Accessible: Concourse: Both entrances Platforms: All platforms

Other information
- Station code: PL02

History
- Opened: April 5, 2004; 22 years ago

Services
Preceding station	Manila LRT	Following station
Pureza towards Antipolo	LRT Line 2	Recto Terminus
Track layout
Location
- Location within Manila Location within Metro Manila Location within Luzon Location within Philippines

Legarda station is an elevated Light Rail Transit (LRT) station located on the LRT Line 2 (LRT-2) system in Sampaloc, Manila. It is named after Legarda Street, where the station sits above it. The street in turn is named after Benito Legarda, a Filipino legislator.

The station is the second station for trains headed to Antipolo and the twelfth station for trains headed to Recto. It first commenced operations on April 5, 2004, and served as the western terminus of the line until Recto station opened on October 29, 2004.

It is regarded as one of the busiest stations of the line.

== Nearby landmarks ==
Students who study in nearby universities such as University of the East and San Sebastian College along Recto Avenue; as well as San Beda University, Centro Escolar University, Victorino Mapa High School, La Consolacion College, and College of the Holy Spirit, all situated within the University Belt along the famed Mendiola Street; the Samson College of Science and Technology along Legarda Street; and also the Arellano University and National Teachers College, alight in this station.

Mendiola Street also leads to Malacañang Palace in San Miguel district.

It is also adjacent to dormitories like the Youniversity Laperal Suites, One Legarda and Legarda Suites. The all-steel Gothic Basilica of San Sebastian, the twin churches of Sampaloc, i.e. Our Lady of Loreto Parish and St. Anthony of Padua Shrine, and Sampaloc Public Market also stand nearby.

== Transportation links ==
Station exterior and parking lot

Buses, taxis, jeepneys, UV Express, and tricycles can be used to navigate the area. Buses, jeepneys, and UV Express ply the Mendiola Street, Legarda Street, and Recto Avenue routes.

Some students studying in the University Belt area opt to depart from this station. The University of Santo Tomas, for instance, is accessible from this station via a jeep bound for Lealtad (now J. Fajardo Street), which they alight from prior to reaching Lacson Avenue, and having a short walk) or by a tricycle.

Students studying in San Beda University opt to use the bridge near the back of the south entrance of the station.

== See also ==
- Manila Light Rail Transit System Line 2
