= Teofilo Guadiz III =

Filipino lawyer

Chairman of the Land Transportation Franchising and Regulatory Board
- Incumbent
- Assumed office December 9, 2022
- President: Bongbong Marcos

Personal details
- Profession: Lawyer

Teofilo E. Guadiz III is a Filipino lawyer. He is currently serving as Chairman of the Land Transportation Franchising and Regulatory Board or LTFRB since December 9, 2022.

He previously served as the Land Transportation Office (LTO) chief.
