= Antipolo station =

LRT Line 2 station in Antipolo, Rizal

Antipolo
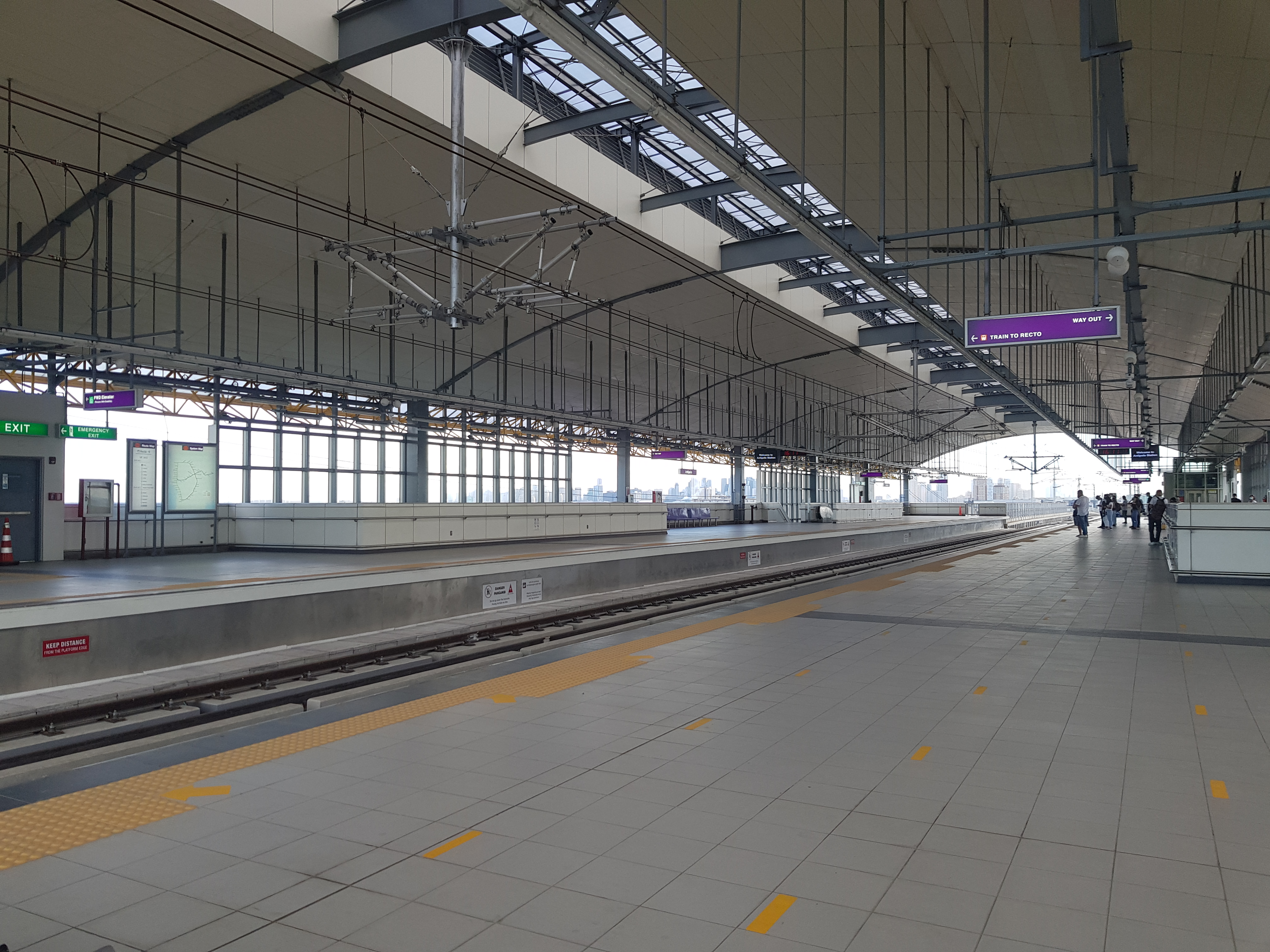

General information
- Location: Marilaque Highway, Mayamot; Antipolo, Rizal; Philippines
- Coordinates: 14°37′29″N 121°7′16″E
- Owner: Department of Transportation; Light Rail Transit Authority
- Line: LRT Line 2
- Platforms: 2 (2 side)
- Tracks: 2
- Connections: 3 Antipolo - Quiapo; East Gate Business Center and Terminal

Construction
- Structure type: Elevated
- Parking: Yes (SM City Masinag)
- Accessible: Concourse: Both entrances Platforms: All platforms

Other information
- Status: Operational
- Station code: PL13

History
- Opened: July 5, 2021; 5 years ago
- Former names: Masinag

Services
Preceding station	Manila LRT	Following station
Terminus	LRT Line 2	Marikina–Pasig towards Recto
Track layout
Location
- Location within Luzon Location within Philippines

Antipolo station, formerly known as Masinag station, is the current eastern terminus of the Light Rail Transit Line 2 (LRT-2) system. It opened on July 5, 2021 and is the line's easternmost station, situated on the stretch of Marikina–Infanta Highway near the intersection of Sumulong Highway in Antipolo, Rizal. It is the first LRT station outside Metro Manila to be operational. It is the first operational train station in Rizal since the original Manila Railroad Company spur lines to the province were permanently decommissioned.

== History ==
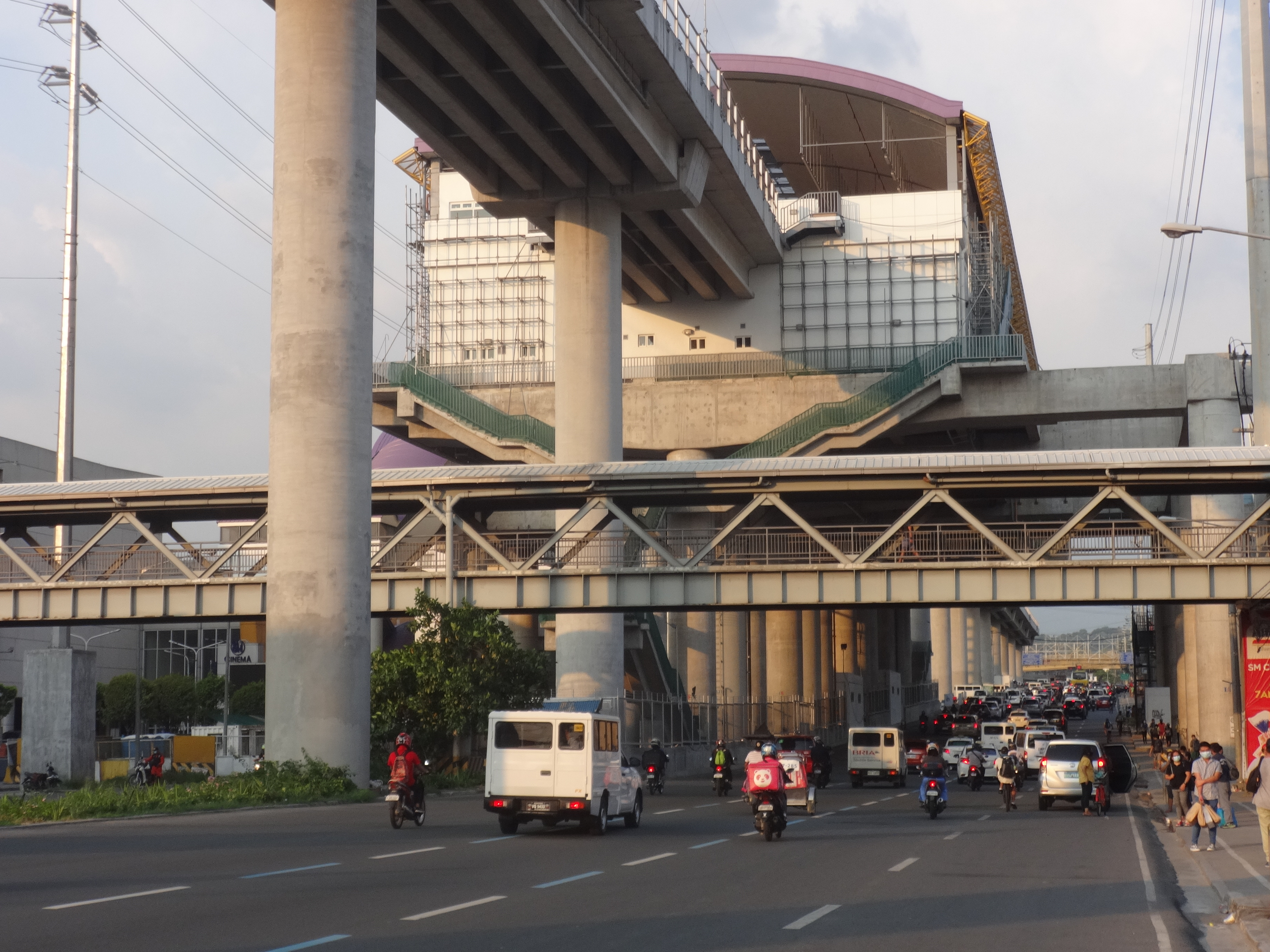
The construction of Antipolo station in June 2020.

The East Extension was suggested in 1999 as part of the Metro Manila Urban Transportation Integration Study (MMUTIS), which advocated for extending the LRT Line 2 toward Antipolo.

Antipolo station was constructed as part of the Line 2 East Extension, which called for a 4-kilometer (2.5 mi) extension eastward from Santolan station and the construction of two stations.

Construction of the Line 2 east extension began in September 2015 while the construction of Antipolo and Marikina stations began in May 2017. The expected opening was supposed to be in the fourth quarter of 2020, but was postponed repeatedly due to the COVID-19 pandemic and various circumstances in integrating the east extension to the line's existing systems. Earlier, the station was called Masinag Station, however, it was renamed in early 2021 for its location in Antipolo.

The east extension was inaugurated on July 1, 2021 by President Rodrigo Duterte, and Antipolo station opened on July 5, 2021. Rides for the East Extension were free of charge until July 18, 2021. Due to the location's elevation for a possible future extension to Cogeo, the height between the ground and concourse levels is equivalent to three levels. As such, the end of the line after the switching tracks has provisions for a continuation.

== Nearby landmarks ==
The station is situated nearby SM City Masinag, and East Gate Business Center and Terminal Center via walkway which is a transport terminal for buses, e-jeeps and tricycles bound for Padilla-Paenaan and the city proper of Antipolo. Other adjacent landmarks include the National Shrine and Parish of St. Therese of the Child Jesus, Cornel Medical Center, and Metro Antipolo Hospital and Medical Center. Residential subdivisions such as Kingsville Executive Village, Vermont Park Executive Village, Golden Meadows Executive Village, and Filinvest East Homes are found in the vicinity of the station.
