= Light Rail Transit Authority =

Philippine public transport operator

Overview
- Main regions: Metro Manila, Calabarzon
- Stations called at: 38
- Stations operated: 13
- Locale: Metro Manila, Rizal (Note: For the LRT Line 2 east extension)
- Dates of operation: December 1, 1984–present

Other
- Native name: Pangasiwaan ng Magaan na Riles Panlulan
- Type: Government-owned and controlled corporation
- Industry: Public transport
- Founded: July 12, 1980; 46 years ago
- Headquarters: LRTA Compound, Line 2 Santolan Depot, Pasig, Philippines
- Area served: Metro Manila
- Key people: Hernando T. Cabrera, Administrator
- Services: Rail Service
- Revenue: ₱1,564,306,670 (2019)
- Total assets: ₱59,791,862,600 (2019)
- Owner: Government of the Philippines, managed by Department of Transportation
- Number of employees: 1,159 of which 342 are permanent/regular employees, 480 contractual personnel and 337 contract of services employees (2019)
- Website: www.lrta.gov.ph

The Light Rail Transit Authority (LRTA; Filipino: Pangasiwaan sa Light Rail Transit) is a public transportation operator responsible for the construction, operation, maintenance, and/or lease of the Manila Light Rail Transit System in the Philippines. It is a government-owned and controlled corporation under the Department of Transportation (DOTr), to which it is attached.

== History ==
The results of a fourteen-month study conducted between 1976 and 1977 by Freeman Fox and Associates suggested a street-level light rail line in Manila. These proposals were revised by the Ministry of Transportation and Communications, later the Department of Transportation (DOTr), to an elevated system in order to avoid building in the city's many intersections.

On July 12, 1980, President Ferdinand Marcos created the Light Rail Transit Authority through Executive Order No. 603, and assigned First Lady and Governor of Metro Manila Imelda Marcos as its chairman. While the LRTA confined its roles to policy making, fare regulation, and future planning, LRT Line 1's operations were assigned to Meralco Transit Organization (Metro, Inc.), a sister company of Meralco. The line came to be referred to as Metrorail.

Construction of Line 1 began in September 1981. The section from Baclaran to Central Terminal was opened on December 1, 1984, with all remaining stations opening on May 12, 1985.

On June 27, 1984, a lease contract was signed between Imelda Marcos, as chairperson of the Philippine General Hospital Foundation, Inc. (PGHFI), and LRTA Vice Chairman Jose P. Dans, Jr., the minister of transportation, that leased a 7340-square meter LRTA property in Pasay to the PGHFI. This lease agreement, alongside the testimony of realtor Ramon Cuervo, became the basis for the conviction of Marcos and Dans on two counts of graft by the Sandiganbayan First Division as headed by Justice Francis Garchitorena on September 24, 1993, sentencing Marcos to a maximum of 24 years in prison. Marcos argued that the money received from the sublease went to the Philippine Heart Center. However, the conviction was later overturned in October 1998 by the Supreme Court, deeming Marcos to have acted not as a public officer that chaired the LRTA but as chairperson of the private foundation PGHFI, and that Marcos committed no conspiracy with Dans.

On August 1, 2000, LRTA assumed the operational responsibility after employees of METRO, Inc. hosted a wildcat strike that paralyzed the line's operations from July 25 to August 2, 2000.

With Japan's ODA amounting to 75 billion yen in total, the construction of Line 2 began in 1996, and the first section of the line, from Santolan to Araneta Center-Cubao, was opened on April 5, 2003. The remaining stations opened exactly a year later, except for Recto station which opened on October 29, 2004.

In January 2017, LRTA administrator Reynaldo Berroya announced the plan to establish a railway school for LRTA employees. For this school, in May 2018, LRTA first launched a train simulator purchased from Lander Simulations and Training Solutions, a company based in Spain.

== Train service ==
	Line 1	Line 2	Line 6 (Proposed)
Ownership	Light Rail Transit Authority (Note: LRTA is responsible for monitoring the Line 1 concessionaire Light Rail Manila Corporation.)	Light Rail Transit Authority	TBA
Operations & Maintenance	Light Rail Manila Corporation (thru PPP scheme)	Light Rail Transit Authority	TBA

== Board of directors ==
The board of directors is composed of eight ex-officio cabinet members namely the secretary of the DOTr as chairman, the respective secretaries of the DPWH, DBM, DOF and DEPDev, the chairman of the MMDA and the LTFRB and the administrator of the LRTA and one representative from the private sector.

The Board is tasked to issue, prescribe, and adopt policies, programs, plans, standards, guidelines, procedures, rules, and regulations for implementation, enforcement, and application by the LRTA Management. The Board also convenes to resolve operations-related issues and concerns and other matters requiring immediate attention and resolution.

- Sec. Giovanni Z. Lopez – Chairman of the Board / Department of Transportation
- Hernando T. Cabrera - Administrator - LRTA
- Sec. Ralph Recto – Department of Finance
- Sec. Amenah Pangadaman – Department of Budget and Management
- Chair Romando Artes – Metro Manila Development Authority
- Sec. Vince Dizon – Department of Public Works and Highways
- Chair Teofilo Guadiz III – Land Transportation Franchising and Regulatory Board
- SEP Sec. Arsenio Balisacan – National Economic and Development Authority
- Dimapuno R. Datu – Private Sector

== Ongoing projects ==
=== Line 1 O&M, Cavite Extension and Capacity Expansion Project ===
During the presidency of Pres. Benigno Aquino III, on October 2, 2014, the Department of Transportation and Light Rail Transit Authority signed a 32-year concession agreement with Light Rail Manila Corporation, a private consortium composed of AC Infra, Metro Pacific Light Rail Corporation and Macquarie Group for the Line 1 Operations & Maintenance, construction of the Cavite Extension and Capacity Expansion.

Under the concession agreement, LRMC is responsible for the Operations & Maintenance of Line 1 and construction of the Cavite Extension while LRTA is responsible for procuring 120 new light rail vehicles for the Capacity Expansion and acquisition of the Right-of-way for the Cavite Extension.

== Issues ==
=== Anomalies with the LRT Line 2 equipment ===
On 4 December 2019, a fact-finding committee was formed by then-administrator Gen. Reynaldo I. Berroya (Ret.) to review several LRT Line 2 contracts. On 21 January 2021, the Presidential Anti-Corruption Commission found inconsistencies in the procurement of equipment worth up to ₱170.3 million. The documents showed that re-railing and rolling stock diagnostic equipment for Line 2 were different from the specified brand in the bidding. The crate containing the re-railing equipment showed a sticker printout that it was shipped by Chinese firm CRRC Corporation, as ordered by the joint venture of Kempal Construction and Supply Corporation. However, documents showed that it was manufactured by Bemco, an Indian company. Irregularities were also seen in the procurement of escalators delivered by Ma-an Construction Inc. and IFE Elevators Inc, wherein the capacity of the escalators were 6,000 persons per hour, short of the required 9,000 persons per hour capacity. LRTA officials stated on 23 January that they will submit an initial report to the PACC. On 7 December 2021, LRTA filed corruption cases against some LRTA and DBM officials. DOTr Secretary Arthur Tugade has then ordered the review of other LRT-2 rehabilitation projects and blacklisting of the joint venture of Ma-an Construction Inc. and IFE Elevators Inc. The escalators and elevators were later fixed by January 2022 as one of the priority projects of the agency.
