= List of crossings of the Marikina River =

Locations of the river's bridges within Metro Manila

This is a list of bridges and other crossings of the Marikina River in Rizal and eastern Metro Manila, Philippines.

The crossings are listed in order, starting from its source at the tri-junction with the Boso Boso River and the Sapa Bute River and proceeding downstream at the Pasig River.

As of 2015, there are a total of sixteen bridge spans that cross the Marikina River, including one rail bridge, carrying the LRT Line 2 track.

== Crossings ==
| # | Crossing | Image | West bank | Carries | East bank | Built | Coordinates |
|---|---|---|---|---|---|---|---|
| 1 | Pacific Bridge | | Rodriguez, Rizal | Two lanes to Pacific Concrete Products Inc. Access Road | Rodriguez, Rizal | | 14.44°N 121.10°E |
| 2 | Rancho Luisito Way Bridge | | Rodriguez, Rizal | Two lanes of Rancho Luisito Way | Rodriguez, Rizal | | 14.44°N 121.9°E |
| 3 | Eastwood Greenview Bridge | | Rodriguez, Rizal | Eastwood Greenview Drive | Rodriguez, Rizal | | 14.44°N 121.9°E |
| 4 | Phil Rock Spillway Bridge | | Rodriguez, Rizal | Two lanes of C. Reyes Street | Rodriguez, Rizal | | 14.44°N 121.9°E |
| 5 | San Jose Bridge; Montalban Bridge | | Rodriguez, Rizal | Four lanes of Rodriguez Highway | Rodriguez, Rizal | | 14.43°N 121.7°E |
| 6 | Batasan–San Mateo Bridge | | Quezon City | Four lanes of Batasan-San Mateo Road | San Mateo, Rizal | | 14.40°N 121.6°E |
| 7 | Gil Fernando Bridge; Tumana Bridge | | Marikina | Two lanes between Moscow Street and Bagong Farmers 1 Avenue | Marikina | 2007 | 14.39°N 121.5°E |
| 8 | Marikina Bridge; A. Bonifacio Bridge | | Marikina | Four lanes of A. Bonifacio Avenue | Marikina | 1979 | 14.38°N 121.5°E |
| 9 | Marcos Bridge | | Marikina | Six lanes of N59 (Marcos Highway) | Marikina | 1979 | 14.39°N 121.20°E |
| 10 | LRT Line 2 bridge | | Marikina | LRT Line 2 | Marikina | | 14.37°N 121.4°E |
| 11 | Diosdado Macapagal Bridge | | Marikina | Four lanes of FVR Road | Marikina | | 14.37°N 121.4°E |
| 12 | Caruncho Bridge; F. Manalo Bridge | | Quezon City | Two lanes of Caruncho Road | Pasig | | 14.36°N 121.5°E |
| 13 | Bridgetowne Viaduct | | Quezon City | Two lanes of Bridgetowne Boulevard | Pasig | 2019 | 14.6°N 121.1°E |
| 14 | Rosario Bridge | | Pasig | Six lanes of N60 (Ortigas Avenue) | Pasig | 1979 | 14.35°N 121.5°E |
| 15 | Sandoval Bridge | | Pasig | Two lanes of Eagle Street | Pasig | | 14.586°N 121.025°E |
| 16 | Kaginhawaan Bridge | | Pasig | Lanuza Avenue to P. Conducto Street | Pasig | 2017 | 14.34°N 121.04°E |
| 17 | Vargas Bridge | | Pasig | Four lanes of Pasig Boulevard Extension | Pasig | 1992 | 14.33°N 121.27°E |
| 18 | Santa Rosa de Lima Bridge | | Pasig | Two lanes of Dr. Garcia Street | Pasig | | 14.33°N 121.4°E |

== Planned crossings ==
| Crossing | West bank | Carries | East bank | Projected completion | Coordinates |
|---|---|---|---|---|---|
| Kabayani–Katipunan Bridge | Pansol, Quezon City | Kabayani Road and Katipunan Street | Malanday, Marikina | | |
| Reposo–Guatemala Bridge | Pansol, Quezon City | Reposo Street and Guatemala Street | Malanday, Marikina | | |
| J.P. Rizal–Yale Bridge | Pansol, Quezon City | J.P. Rizal Street and Yale Street | Malanday, Marikina | | |
| G. Gabriel Street–Mercury Avenue Bridge | Libis, Quezon City | G. Gabriel Street and Mercury Avenue | Santolan, Pasig | | |
