= Sumulong Highway =

Road in the Philippines

Coordinates: 14°37′1″N 121°8′7″E

Sumulong Highway

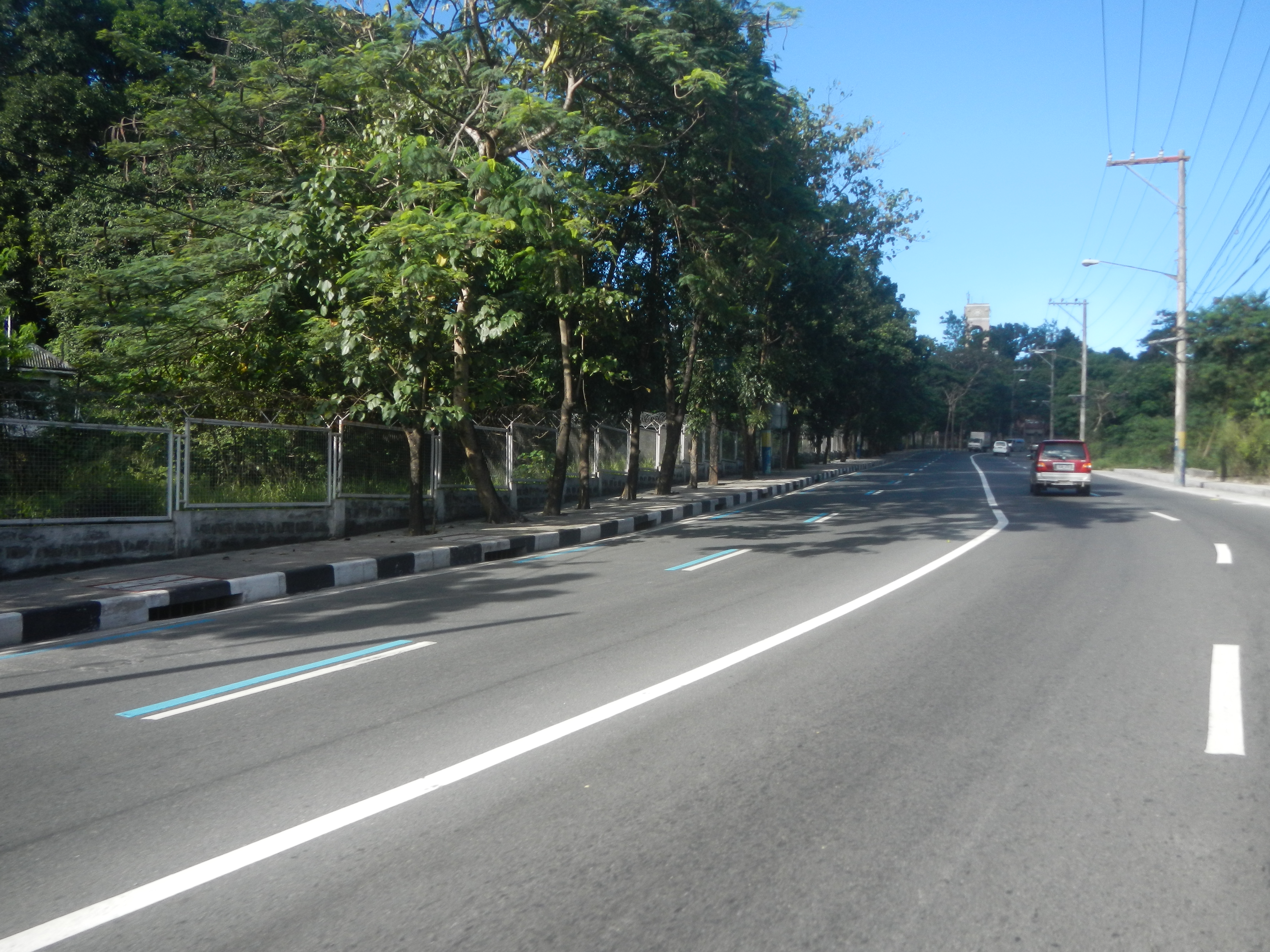
- The highway in Mambugan, Antipolo

Route information
- Length: 12.668 km (7.872 mi)
- Component highways: N601-1 from Marikina to Antipolo; N59 in Antipolo

Major junctions
- From: Andres Bonifacio Avenue and J.P. Rizal Street in Marikina
- N59 / N601-1 (Marcos Highway) at Mayamot (Masinag), Antipolo
- To: N601 (Sen. L. Sumulong Memorial Circle) / J.P. Rizal Street in Antipolo

Location
- Country: Philippines
- Major cities: Marikina and Antipolo
- Towns: Cainta

Highway system
- Roads in the Philippines; Highways; Expressways; List

The Sumulong Highway (formally known as Antipolo-Victoria Valley-Marikina Road) is a highway in the Philippines connecting Marikina in Metro Manila with Antipolo and Cainta in the province of Rizal. Constructed in 1960, it is named after Don Juan Sumulong, an Antipolo native who served as the country's senator and founder of the Democrata Party.

The highway continues A. Bonifacio Avenue past J.P. Rizal Street at the city proper of Marikina. It then proceeds eastwards, eventually entering the province of Rizal at Cainta. It enters Antipolo, where it veers south to meet the Marcos Highway (Marikina-Infanta Highway) at the Masinag Junction. It then traverses the mountainous terrain until it meets its terminus at Senator Lorenzo Sumulong Memorial Circle, where it is continued by J.P. Rizal Street towards the city proper of Antipolo. It is sometimes referred to in media as the "killer highway" due to numerous accidents, especially between Sitio Maligaya and Mambugan Barangay Hall. The highway's segment in Antipolo, particularly between the Rizal provincial boundary and Masinag Junction, is also officially known as Marikina-Victoria Valley-Antipolo Road. This will also have an access to the Southeast Metro Manila Expressway.

Since 2014, when the Department of Public Works and Highways (DPWH) began implementing the new route numbering system, it has been a component of National Route 59 (N59) of the highway in the Philippine highway network, running from its intersection with Marcos Highway at Masinag Junction to Sen. L. Sumulong Memorial Circle, the road's endpoint at the city proper, both in Antipolo. Meanwhile, its remaining section from Masinag Junction to its western terminus in Marikina is a component of National Route 601-1 (N601-1) since its upgrade in 2025.

== Intersections ==
Province	City/Municipality	km	mi	Destinations	Notes
Rizal	Antipolo			N601 (Sen. L. Sumulong Memorial Circle)	Eastern terminus. Continues east as J.P. Rizal Street
Rizal	Antipolo			Magsaysay Street / Kalibo Street	
Rizal	Antipolo			Assumption Road	
Rizal	Antipolo			Upper Lucban Road / Olalia Road	
Rizal	Antipolo			Ambrosio F. Neri Street	
Rizal	Antipolo			Siruna Road	
Rizal	Antipolo			Absalon Drive	
Rizal	Antipolo			Gertrudes Street	
Rizal	Antipolo			N59 / N601-1 (Marikina–Infanta Highway)	Traffic light intersection. Route number changes from N59 to N601-1.
Rizal	Antipolo			Oliveros Street	
Rizal	Antipolo			Soliven Avenue	
Rizal	Antipolo			MacAdams Road	
Rizal	Cainta			Felix Manalo Street	
Rizal	Cainta			San Isidro Avenue	
Cainta–Marikina boundary				Metro Manila 1st District Engineering Office–Rizal 1st District Engineering Office highway boundary	
Marikina				Katipunan Street Extension	Traffic light intersection.
Marikina				Gil Fernando Avenue	Traffic light intersection.
Marikina				McDonald's Avenue / Toyota Avenue	Former traffic light intersection.
Marikina				Shoe Avenue	Traffic light intersection.
Marikina				J.P. Rizal Street	Western terminus. Continues west as A. Bonifacio Avenue.
1.000 mi = 1.609 km; 1.000 km = 0.621 mi: Closed/former; Route transition

== Landmarks ==
This is from J.P. Rizal in Marikina up to L. Sumulong Memorial Circle in Antipolo:

Marikina

- Marikina Sports Center
- Blue Wave-Marikina

Antipolo

- Masinag junction
- Xentromall Antipolo
- JAC Liner depot
- College of San Benildo
- Our Lady of Fatima University-Antipolo
- Robinsons Antipolo
- Antipolo Public Market
