= Sta. Lucia Mall =

Shopping mall in the Philippines

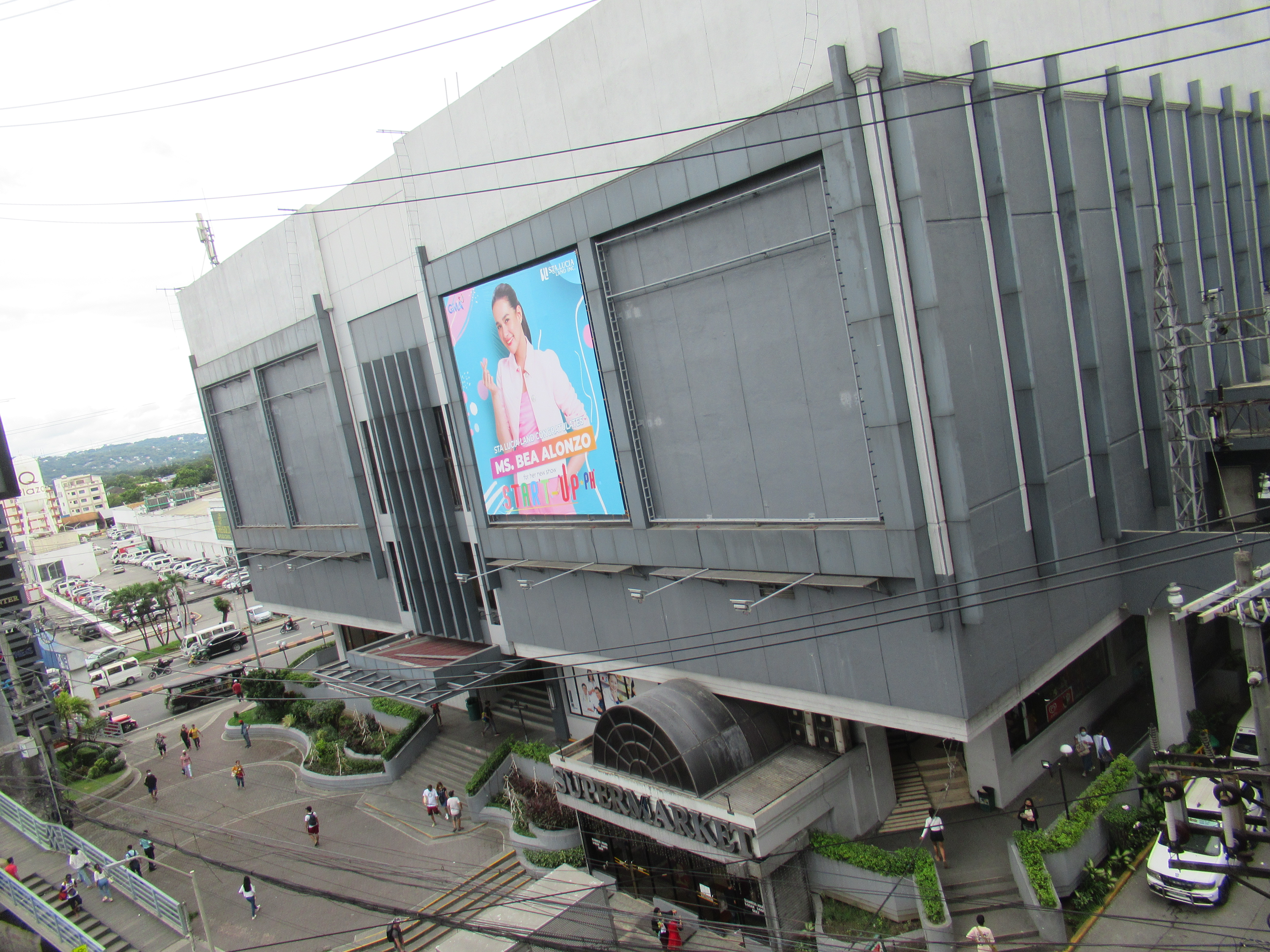
- Mall facade in 2022
- Location: Cainta, Rizal (disputed with Pasig, Metro Manila, Philippines)
- Coordinates: 14°37′06″N 121°05′59″E
- Address: Marikina–Infanta Highway corner Felix Avenue, Barangay San Isidro, Cainta 1900 Rizal, Philippines (disputed boundary with Barangay Dela Paz, Pasig)
- Opened: 1991; 35 years ago
- Developer: Sta. Lucia Realty & Development Inc.
- Manager: Sta. Lucia Realty & Development Inc.
- Num. of stores: 300+
- Floor area: 230,000 m^{2} (2,500,000 sq ft) (2022)
- Floors: Phases 1 and 2: 4 Phase 3: 5 il Centro: 3
- Parking: 1000+ slots
- Public transit: Marikina–Pasig
- Website: www.staluciamall.com

Sta. Lucia Mall (formally Sta. Lucia East Grand Mall) is a shopping mall owned by Sta. Lucia Realty & Development Inc. It is situated at the intersection of Marikina–Infanta Highway, and Felix Avenue, located at Barangay San Isidro, Cainta, Rizal (disputed boundary with Brgy. Dela Paz, Pasig), Philippines, beside Robinsons Metro East and near the tripoint boundary of these two areas and Marikina.

The mall opened in 1991 as a 19,000 m^{2} (200,000 sq ft) shopping complex, the first in its locale. As of 2014, it had a total gross floor area of 230,000 m^{2} (2,500,000 sq ft). The mall is currently the largest shopping mall located in Rizal and Calabarzon in terms of floor area.

== History ==
In 1991, certain of the market potentials in the east side of the metropolis and driven by the desire to diversify, Sta. Lucia East Realty and Development, Inc. (SLRDI) built Phase 1 of Sta. Lucia East Grand Mall. Two years later, in 1993, Phase II was formally opened to offer better facilities, more specialty stores, service centers, additional cinemas, a 32-lane bowling center, an entertainment arcade and a junior department store.

On May 18, 1998, Phase III was unveiled offering bigger spaces and more comprehensive shopping and entertainment facilities. In 2005, the mall's six cinemas were renovated and it became known as the Theatre Zone. The mall was declared a Wi-Fi zone in 2007, offering free internet access to all shoppers.

In 2014, SLRDI finished constructing the 3-level mall called iL Centro located next to the mall and is connected by a bridge offering more shops, and services. It will serve as the podium of the planned five-tower development called Sta. Lucia Residenzes.

The mall is currently under redevelopment as of 2023.

== Location ==
The mall is located beside Robinsons Metro East and situated at the busy intersection of Marikina–Infanta Highway, and Felix Avenue in Cainta, Rizal (disputed boundary with Brgy. Dela Paz, Pasig City), near the tripoint boundary of these two areas and Marikina City. It is highly accessible by jeepneys, buses, taxis, and even AUVs from the cities of Antipolo, Marikina, and Pasig, as well as the town itself. It is 5–10 minutes from Katipunan Avenue and Aurora Boulevard, a five-minute jeepney ride from Line 2 Santolan Station and directly connected to Aurora Boulevard via the highway itself. It has direct access to and from LRT-2's Marikina–Pasig station.

It has been a popular place for people coming from Eastern Metro Manila and Rizal, as all of the stores and services have been in existence even before other shopping malls were built.

== Mall features ==
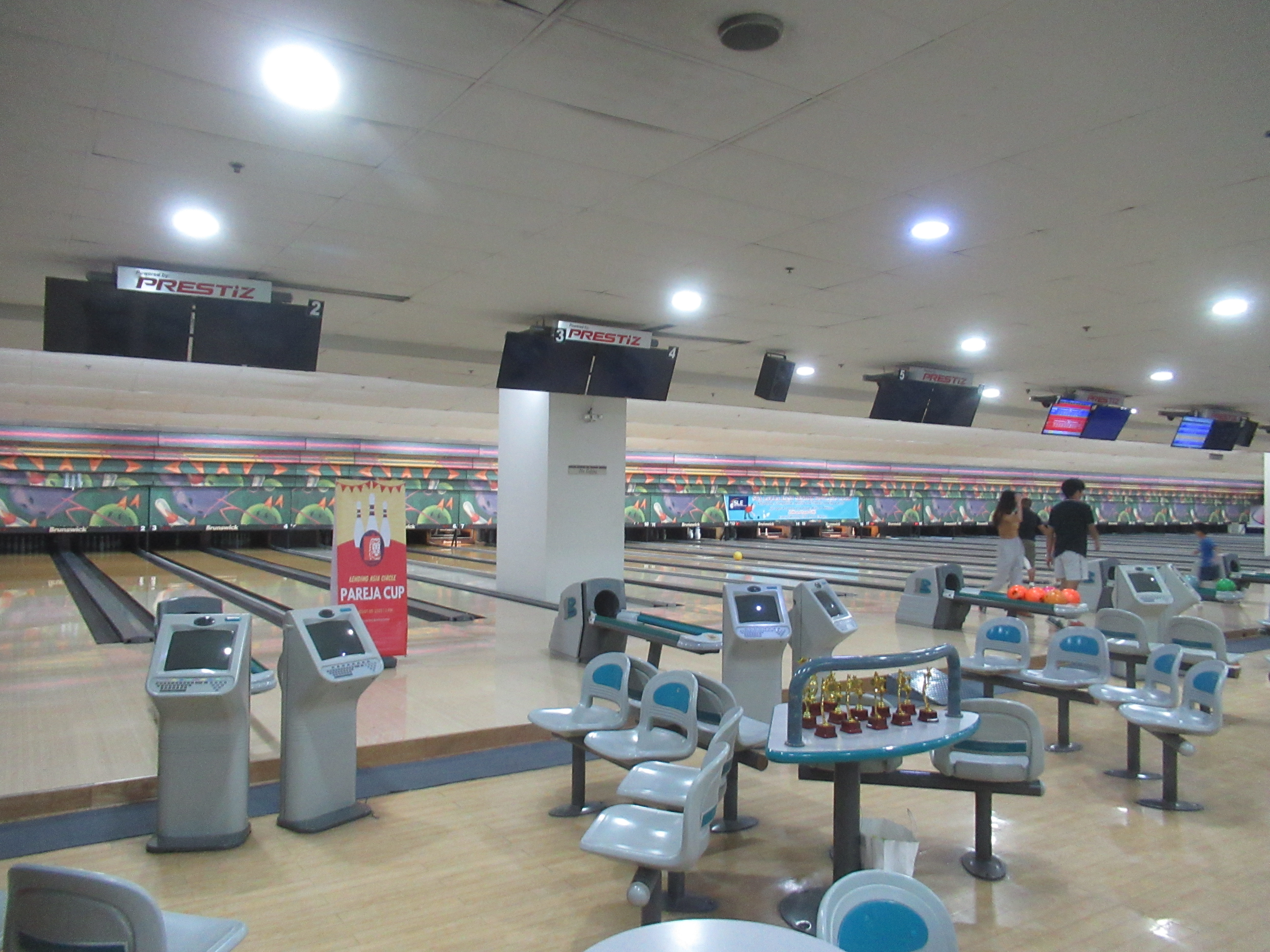
Bowling center

The Sta. Lucia East Grand Mall complex has 4 buildings, which are interconnected by a footbridge. The combined Phase 1 and Phase 2 of the mall has shops, services, and a supermarket located at the basement of the mall. It used to have cinemas on the third level, which are currently used for church services and masses. Home Gallery, located at the basement of the building, has a fine selection of décor, furniture and appliances.

Phase 3 has a three-level, full-line Department Store, a 7,000 square meter supermarket and a foodcourt on the lower ground floor, more upscale stores and restaurants, a 32-lane Bowling Center on the third floor, and a 10-meter high ceiling entertainment center called World of Fun along with the mall’s six cinemas on the fourth floor.

Phase 4 of the mall, il Centro, is a part of Sta. Lucia Residences, a 5-tower residential condominium, where two of which have been completed. Opened in 2014, it contains more shops and services and is accessible via a bridgeway to the mall itself.

The six-story, 10,000 m^{2} (110,000 sq ft) Sta. Lucia Business Center, which is located next to the mall. It will have a retail space on the first and second floors, and office spaces on the rest of the floors. It will be directly connected to the Line 2 Marikina-Pasig station and to the mall itself. The construction was finished by 2022.

== See also ==
- Ayala Malls Feliz
- Robinsons Metro East
- SM City Marikina
