= Radial Road 6 =

Major road in Luzon, Philippines

R-6 Radial Road 6
- The route of Radial Road 6 in Metro Manila. Radial Road 6 is highlighted in red.

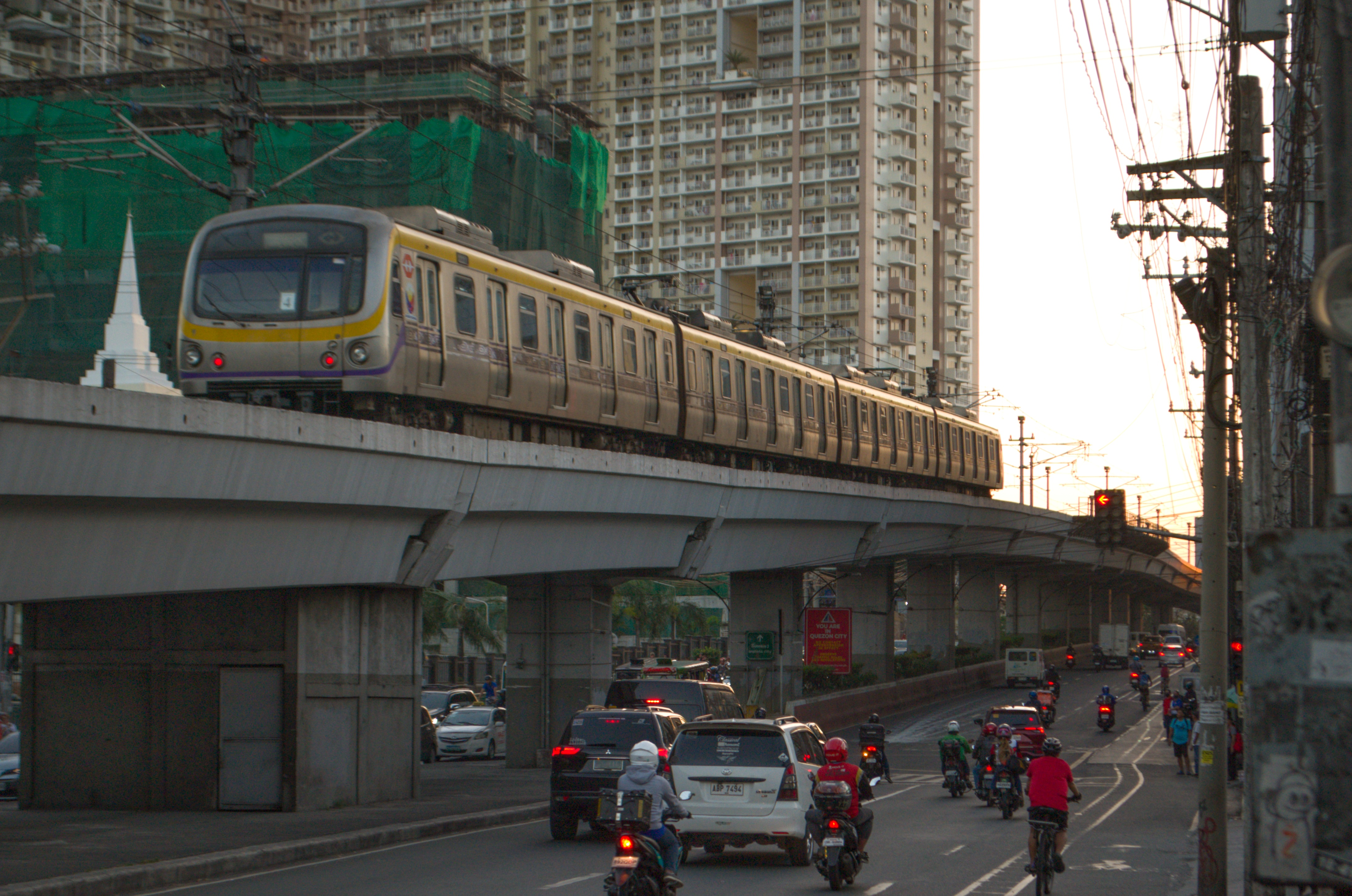
- Aurora Boulevard, part of R-6

Route information
- Maintained by Department of Public Works and Highways and Metropolitan Manila Development Authority
- Length: 125 km (78 mi)
- Component highways: N180 from Manila to Quezon City; N59 from Quezon City to Antipolo

Major junctions
- West end: N145 (Recto Avenue) and Mendiola Street in Manila
- East end: Infanta

Location
- Country: Philippines
- Regions: Calabarzon and Metro Manila
- Major cities: Manila; San Juan; Quezon City; Marikina; Pasig

Highway system
- Roads in the Philippines; Highways; Expressways; List

Radial Road 6 (R-6), informally known as the R-6 Road, is a network of roads and bridges which comprise the sixth arterial road of Metro Manila in the Philippines. Moving to the east, it passes through the cities of Manila, Quezon City, San Juan, Pasig, and Marikina until it terminates at the metropolis's boundary with Rizal.

== Route description ==
=== Legarda Street ===
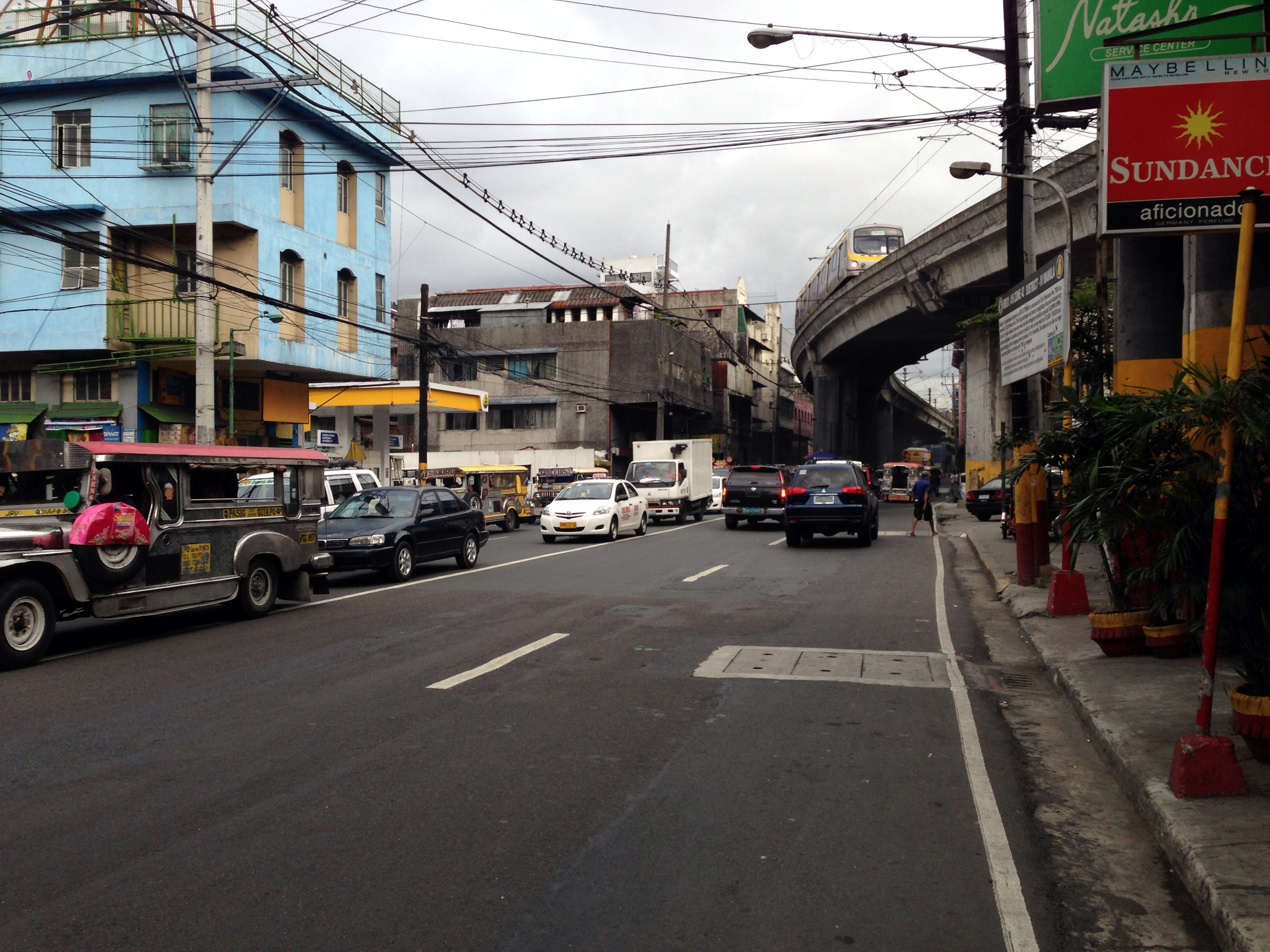
Legarda Street

R-6 includes the segment of Legarda Street from its intersection with Recto Avenue (C-1) and Mendiola Street to the Nagtahan Interchange.

=== Magsaysay Boulevard ===
Magsaysay Boulevard is a 6-8-lane main road in Manila. It starts at the Nagtahan Interchange in Manila and ends at the intersection with Gregorio Araneta Avenue (C-3) in Quezon City. It was formerly part of the Manila Provincial Road and called Santa Mesa Boulevard.

=== Aurora Boulevard ===
Aurora Boulevard is a 4-6-lane avenue in Quezon City and San Juan. Aurora Boulevard is one of the two roads that form the majority portion of the Radial Road 6 (R-6) in Metro Manila, passing through Quezon City and San Juan. Its western endpoint is at the border between Manila and Quezon City, and its northern terminus is at the intersection with Katipunan Avenue or C-5 Road. The avenue was a former portion of a highway connecting Manila to Infanta in Quezon, which was called the Manila Provincial Road and subsequently upgraded into one of Metro Manila's major thoroughfares and renamed after President Manuel L. Quezon's wife and former First Lady Aurora Quezon.

=== Marcos Highway (Marikina-Infanta Highway) ===
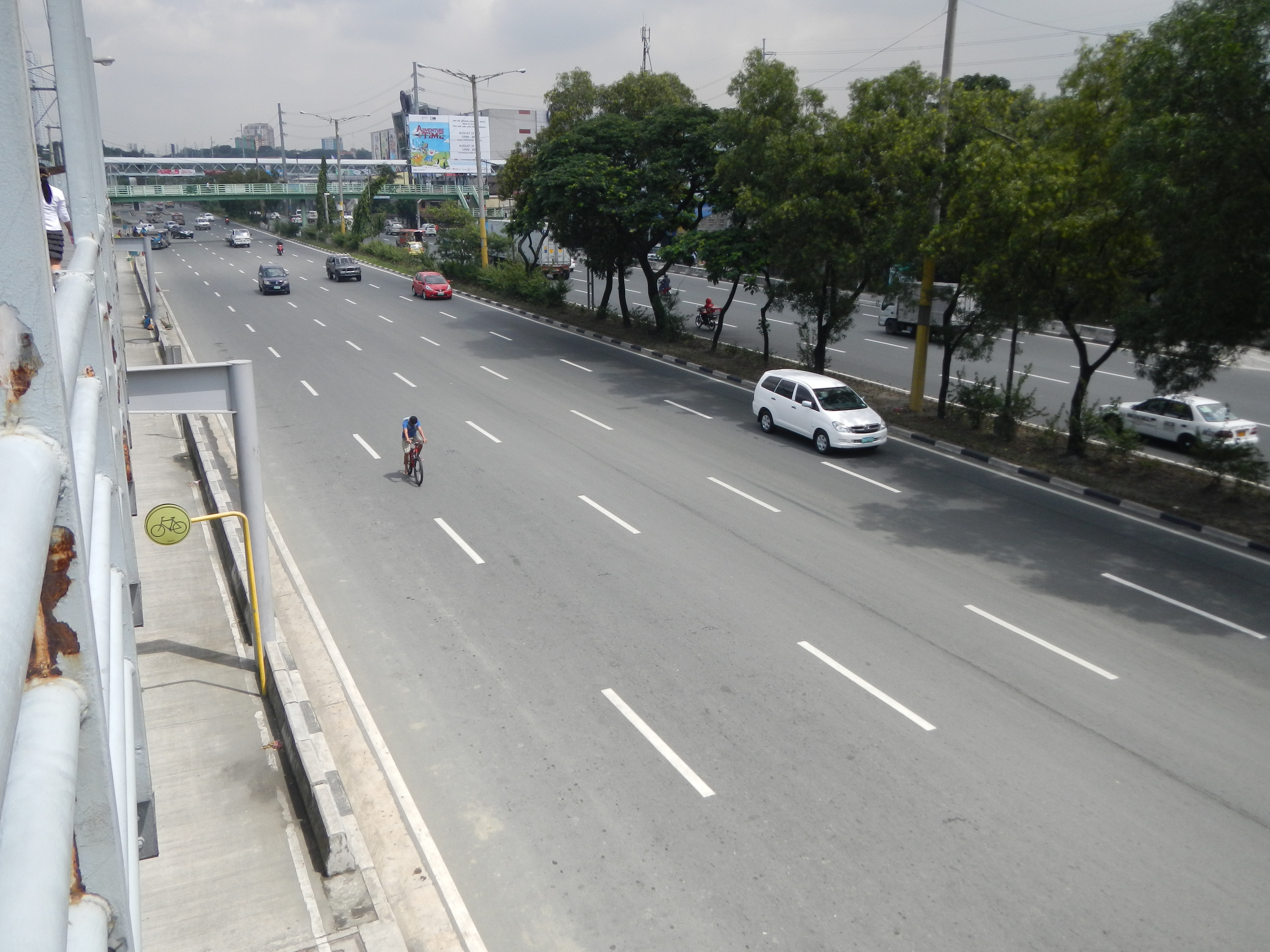
Marcos Highway (Marikina-Infanta Highway) in Calumpang, Marikina

After crossing Katipunan Avenue (C-5), the road becomes the Marcos Highway (Marikina–Infanta Highway). The portion of Marcos Highway that is part of Radial Road 6 is from Katipunan Avenue up to a bridge at the Marikina–Cainta (Metro Manila–Rizal) boundary.

== See also ==
- List of roads in Metro Manila
