= Marcos Bridge =

Marcos Bridge Tulay ng Marcos
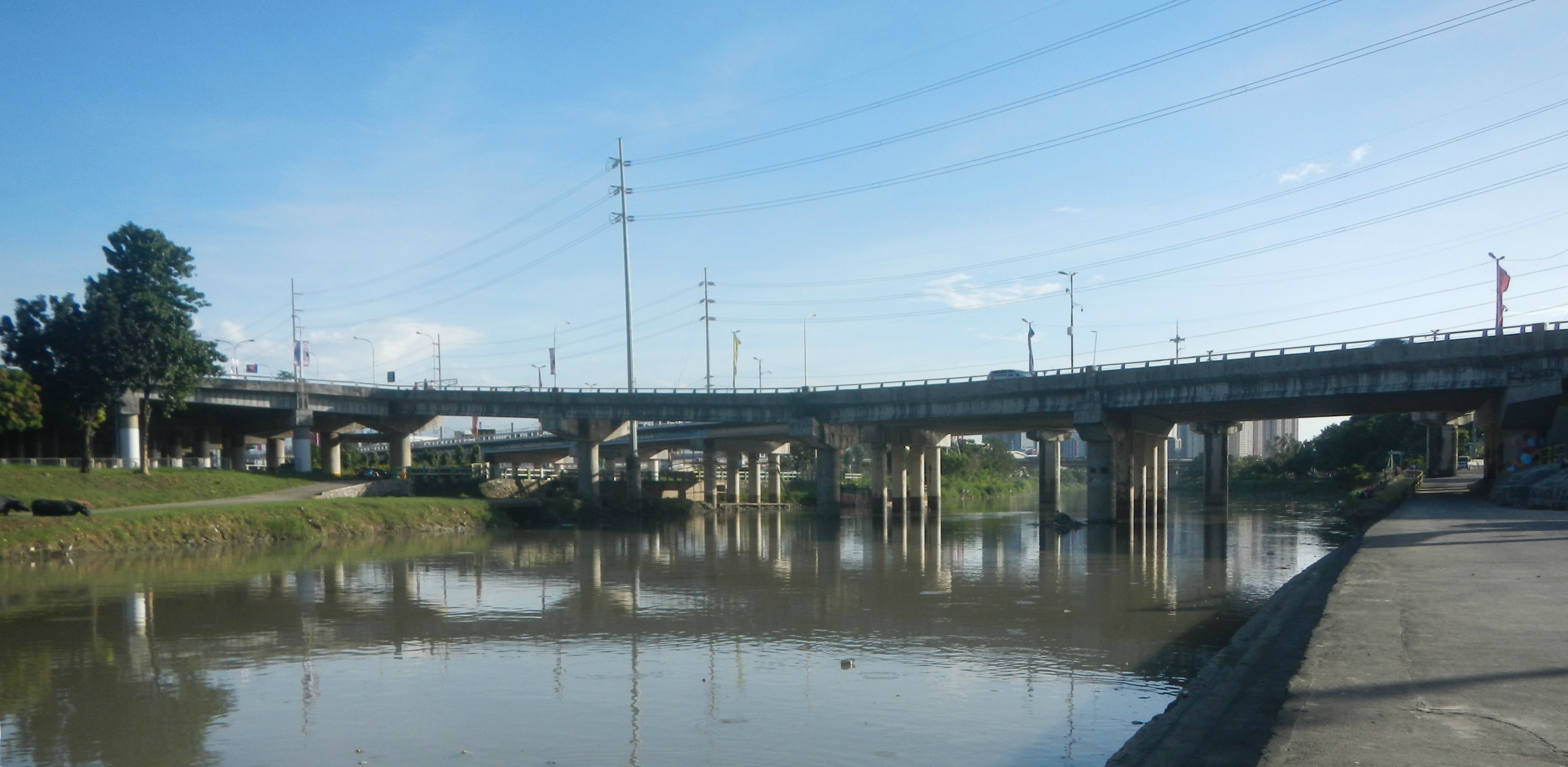
- Coordinates: 14°37′35.42″N 121°4′56.09″E
- Carries: 6 lanes of N59 (Marcos Highway) and pedestrians
- Crosses: Marikina River
- Locale: Marikina, Metro Manila, Philippines
- Maintained by: Department of Public Works and Highways

Characteristics
- Design: I-beam Girder bridge
- Total length: Inner bridge: 341.65 m (1,120.9 ft); Outer bridge: 426.21 m (1,398.3 ft)
- Width: Inner bridge: 18.7 m (61 ft); Outer bridge:11.0 m (36.1 ft)
- Load limit: 20 metric tons (20 long tons; 22 short tons)
- No. of lanes: 6 (2 lanes eastward direction, 4 lanes westward direction)

History
- Construction end: 1979

Statistics
- Daily traffic: 6,400 vehicles per hour (2019)

The Marcos Bridge is a road bridge that connects the Barangays of Calumpang and Barangka in Marikina in Metro Manila, Philippines

The bridge is part of the Marcos Highway (Marikina–Infanta Highway). It consists of an inner bridge and an outer bridge.

The outer bridge was constructed in 2008 with the construction of the SM City Marikina which also doubled as an access road to and from the mall. The length of the inner bridge from its two abutments is 341.65 meters (1,120.9 ft), while the outer bridge is at 426.21 meters (1,398.3 ft). The outer bridge have 2 westbound lanes in total and a junction at the Calumpang side of the bridge connects to the nearby Macapagal Bridge.

A separate but unconnected rail bridge of the Manila Light Rail Transit System's Line 2 line exists parallel to the road bridge. The rail bridge that runs beside the road bridge was constructed by the Hanjin-Itochu Consortium and has a length of 363.39 meters (1,192.2 ft) and a width of 9.4 meters (31 ft).

According to a December 2013 report by Japan International Cooperation Agency, the Marcos Bridge has a high traffic volume of jeepneys, with 6 thousand vehicles crossing the bridge daily.

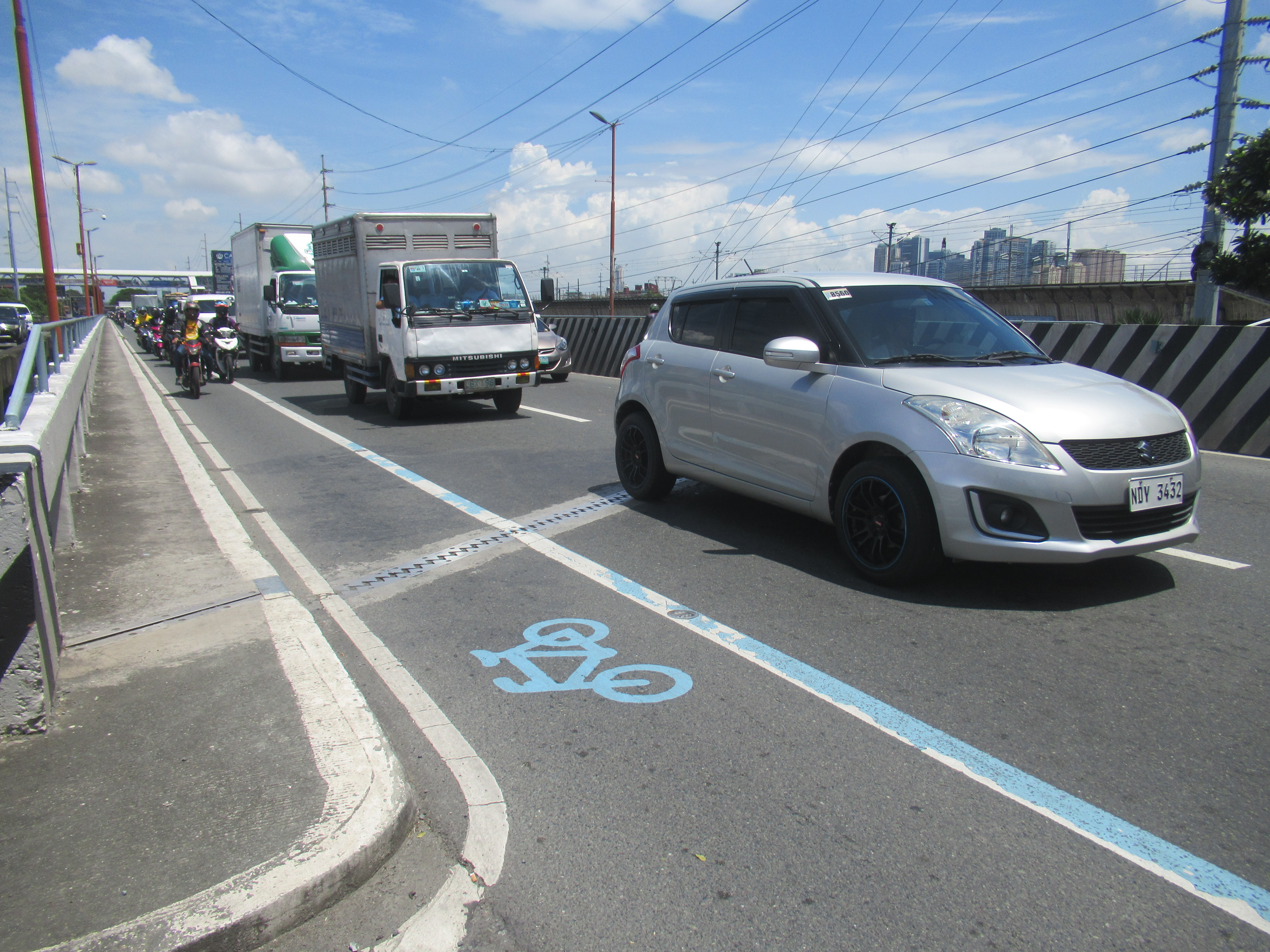
The bridge in 2023 after rehabilitation (2019)

On April 30, 2019, the Metropolitan Manila Development Authority announced the rehabilitation of the Marcos Bridge. The rehabilitation started on May 25, 2019, resulting in closure of the eastbound section that was first rehabilitated, followed by the westbound section four months later. The rehabilitation was finished on October 31, 2019, and the bridge was fully reopened on the same day. The bridge can now withstand a magnitude 7.2 earthquake.
