= SM City Marikina =

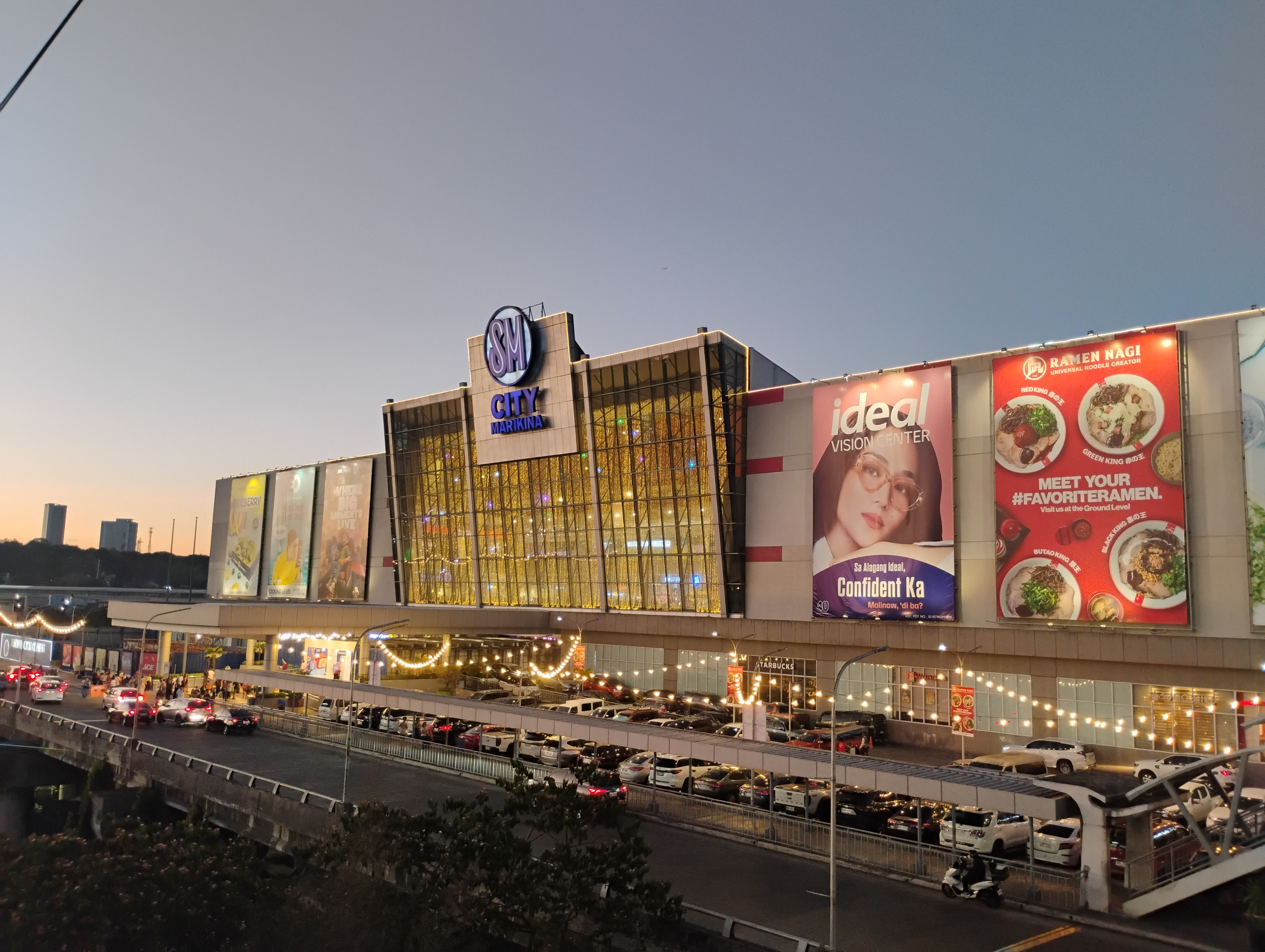
- SM City Marikina in 2026
- Location: Marikina, Metro Manila, Philippines
- Coordinates: 14°37′39″N 121°05′04″E
- Address: Marikina–Infanta Highway, Calumpang
- Opened: September 5, 2008; 18 years ago
- Developer: SM Prime Holdings; BF Construction Corporation
- Manager: SM Prime Holdings
- Num. of stores: 400+
- Num. of anchor tenants: 12
- Floor area: 124,878 m^{2} (1,344,180 sq ft)
- Floors: 5
- Parking: 2,000+ slots
- Public transit: Santolan; 9 SM Marikina
- Website: SM City Marikina

SM City Marikina is a shopping mall owned and managed by SM Prime Holdings, and is located in Calumpang, Marikina, Philippines. As part of the chain of SM Supermalls, the mall is owned by Henry Sy, Sr.

Upon completion in 2008, it is the 31st SM Supermall built in the Philippines, the 14th SM Mall built within Metro Manila, and 3rd among other SM malls to open in the eastern region of Metropolitan Manila, after SM Megamall in Mandaluyong and SM Center Pasig in Pasig. It is also the first SM Mall along Marikina–Infanta Highway before SM City Masinag as well as SM Center Antipolo Downtown, which was formerly known as SM Cherry Antipolo.

SM City Marikina is located near Marikina River and Riverbanks Center. It is situated along Marikina–Infanta Highway, Calumpang, Marikina. This mall has a total of 60,000-square-meter (650,000 sq ft) land area and a total of 124,877.85-square-meter (1,344,174.0 sq ft) square meter gross floor area, make it as the largest single building shopping mall along Marikina-Infanta Highway and considered one of the largest structures within the Marikina Valley. It is also considered one of the most resilient and sustainable mall in the Philippines, it also serves as a place of refuge during times of calamities in the area.

SM City Marikina was opened to the public on September 5, 2008, with opening ceremonies headed by then MMDA Chairman Bayani Fernando, and his wife, then Mayor of Marikina Marides Fernando, and attended by other city officials, as well as Sy and other SM executives.

== History ==
Discussions for an SM mall to be built in Marikina were held as early as 1996. The mall began its plans in 2006 when Henry Sy bought an estimated 60,000-square-meter (650,000 sq ft) lot that was owned by Bayani Fernando which was supposed to become an amusement park called Fun Pamilya. Construction began on early 2006. SM Prime Holdings and BF Construction Corporation are the developers of the mall.

The mall's structures utilized 246 stilts, enabling the mall to support the upper levels (Basement 1 up to top floors) from its ground area (Basement 2). It also has new bridges (branching towards Marikina-Infanta Highway) surrounding the establishment. The mall's main entrance is located at the 3rd level of the building (1st floor of the mall) to be at par with Marikina-Infanta Highway's high elevation, and to minimize if not prevent damage to the structure and the mall itself during flooding.

SM Marikina is currently undergoing major expansion and redevelopment, which will feature a new facade for the mall.

== Location ==
SM City Marikina is located beside the Marikina River and is situated along Marikina-Infanta Highway in Barangay Calumpang, Marikina. The location of the mall is accessible through different modes of public transport such as jeepneys, buses, AUVs, and taxis as well as train via LRT Line 2 Santolan Station. There are also specialized bridges branching out to and from Marikina-Infanta Highway bridge which all vehicles from Antipolo going to Quezon City can directly access the mall. It also has an interchange beneath the Marikina-Infanta Highway bridge, allowing all vehicles to easily access the different points of Metro Manila, like those en route to NAIA, Makati, Ortigas Center, Bonifacio Global City and Eastwood City. SM City Marikina is located nearby many residential areas, and it is one of the easily recognizable and prominent structure in the area.

== Mall features ==
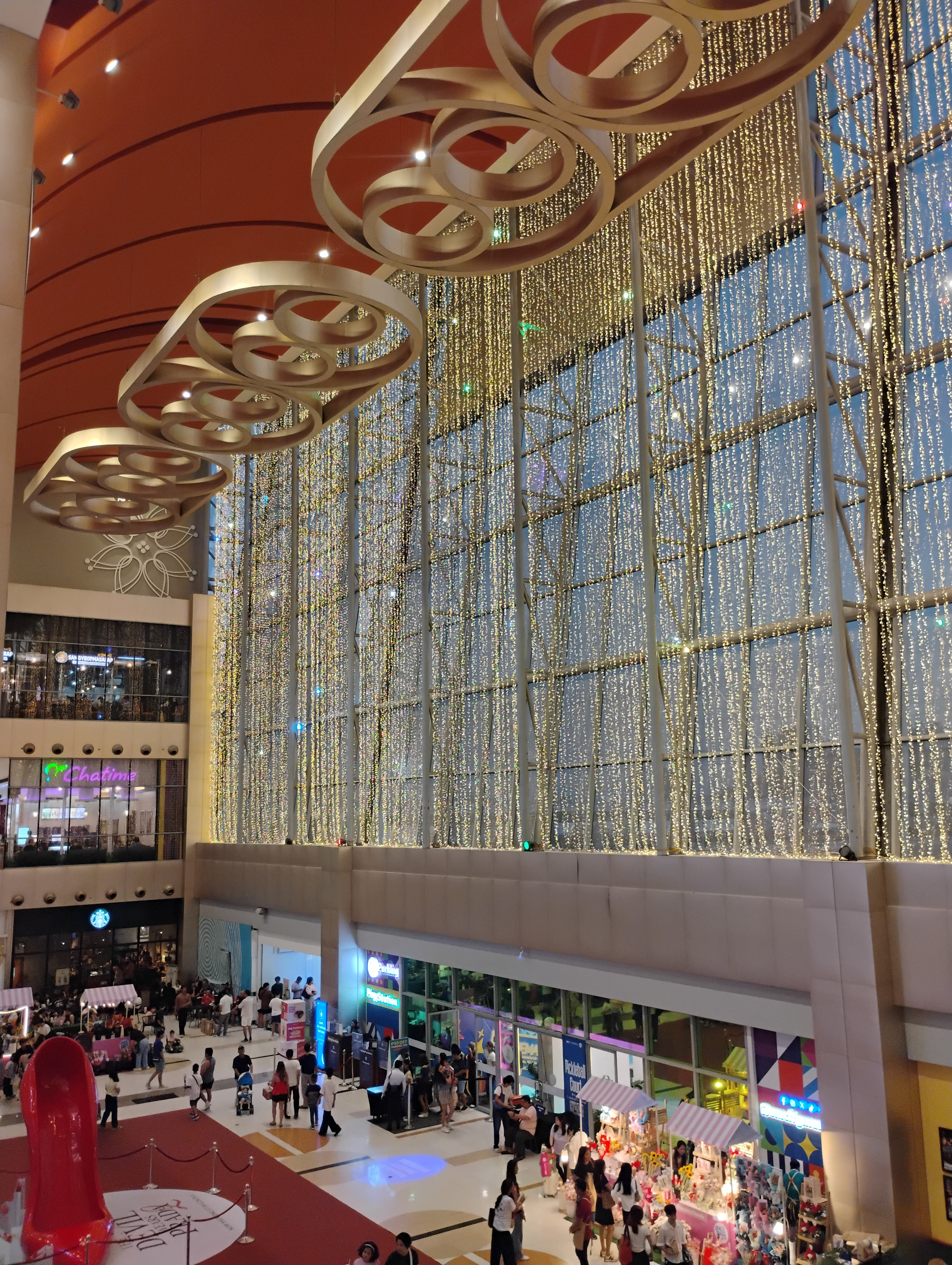
Mall atrium

SM City Marikina's is one of the largest building structures in Marikina. The mall features a five-level building (three upper floors function as the mall area and 2 lower floors serve as the indoor parking lots). It has a grand entrance, high ceilings and interplay of glass and steel, with modern Asian influences. Interiors have spacious areas with multicolored lighted ceilings with circle accents.

It has more than a thousand parking slots including provisions for motorcycle parking, a jeepney terminal for commuters, a 4-meter-wide (13 ft) pedestrian overpass to and from the main mall area to the Santolan LRT-2 station and another 2.40-meter-wide (7.9 ft) overpass to the Bus Bay 2 area.

== See also ==
- Ayala Malls Feliz
- Robinsons Metro East
- Sta. Lucia Mall

Preceded by SM Center Muntinlupa	31st SM Supermall; 2008	Succeeded by SM City Rosales
