= Marikina–Infanta Highway =

Major road in the Philippines

Coordinates: 14°36′49″N 121°20′8″E

Marikina–Infanta Highway (Marilaque Highway/Marcos Highway)

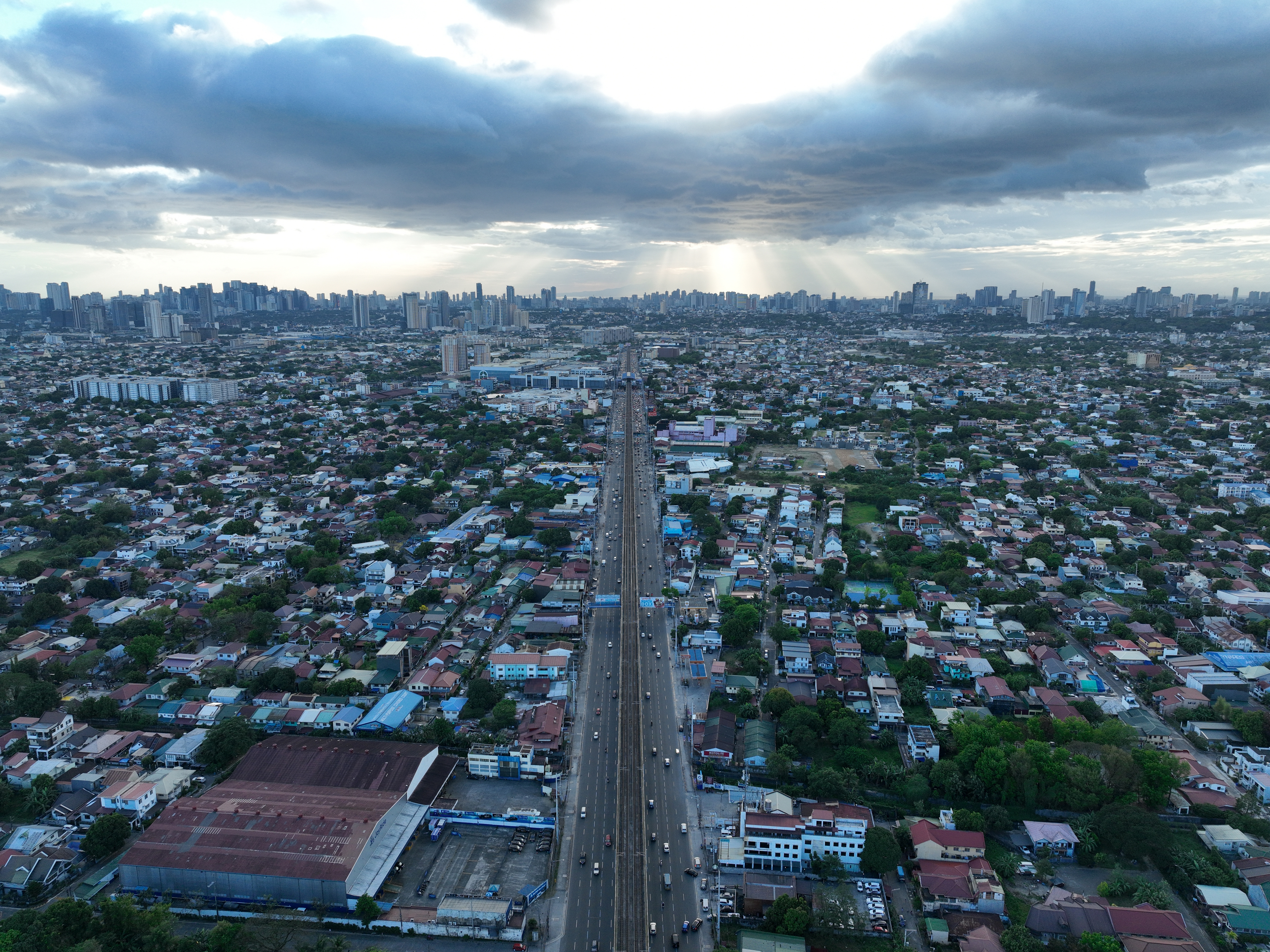
- Aerial view of Marikina–Infanta Highway (2026)

Route information
- Length: 117.5 km (73.0 mi)
- Component highways: R-6 R-6 in Metro Manila; N59 from Quezon City to Antipolo; N601-1 from Antipolo to Infanta

Major junctions
- West end: N59 (Aurora Boulevard) / N11 (Katipunan Avenue) in Quezon City
- N601-1 (A. Bonifacio Avenue) in Marikina; N601 (Felix Avenue) in Cainta; N59 / N601-1 (Sumulong Highway) in Antipolo
- East end: N601 (Famy–Real–Infanta Road) in Infanta, Quezon

Location
- Country: Philippines
- Regions: Metro Manila and Calabarzon
- Provinces: Rizal, Laguna, Quezon
- Major cities: Antipolo, Marikina, and Pasig
- Towns: Baras, Cainta, Pililla, Tanay, Famy, Santa Maria, Infanta, Real

Highway system
- Roads in the Philippines; Highways; Expressways; List

The Marikina–Infanta Highway (also known as Marilaque Highway and Marikina–Infanta Road; formerly known under President Ferdinand Marcos's regime as Marikina Diversion Road, and later Marcos Highway) is a 117.5-kilometer (73.0 mi) highway that connects Quezon City, Metro Manila with Infanta, Quezon in the Philippines.

The Marikina–Infanta Highway starts at the intersection with N11/Circumferential Road 5/Katipunan Avenue in Quezon City, near its boundary with Marikina, as a physical continuation of N59/Aurora Boulevard. It traverses the Marikina Valley as a divided highway and passes through Antipolo, intersecting the Sumulong Highway at Masinag Junction. N59 exits the road to run along Sumulong Highway. After Masinag, the road ascends towards the Sierra Madre mountain range as an undivided highway passing through Tanay, Santa Maria in Laguna, and terminating in Infanta in Quezon.

== Route description ==
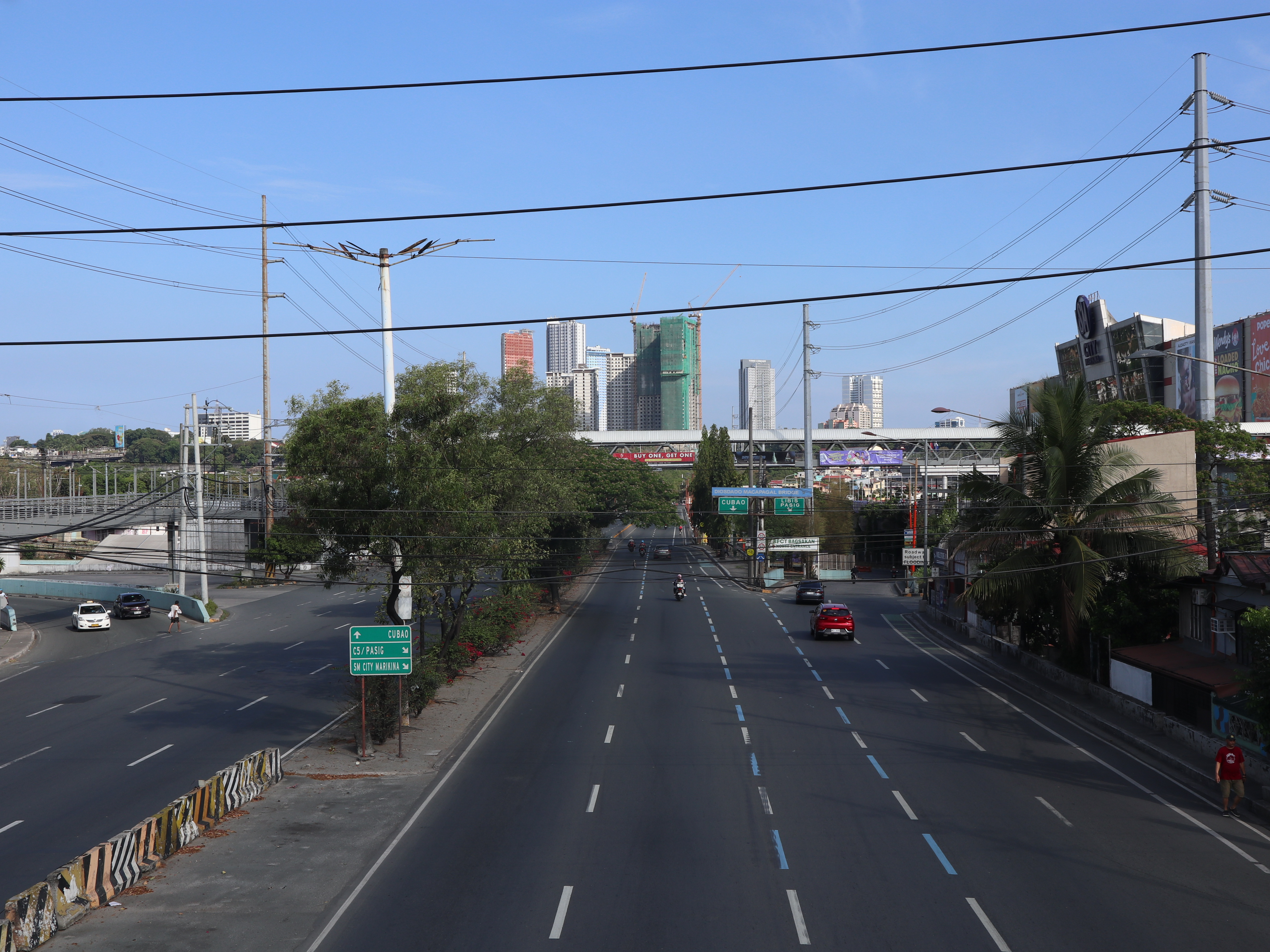
Marikina–Infanta Highway in Calumpang, Marikina

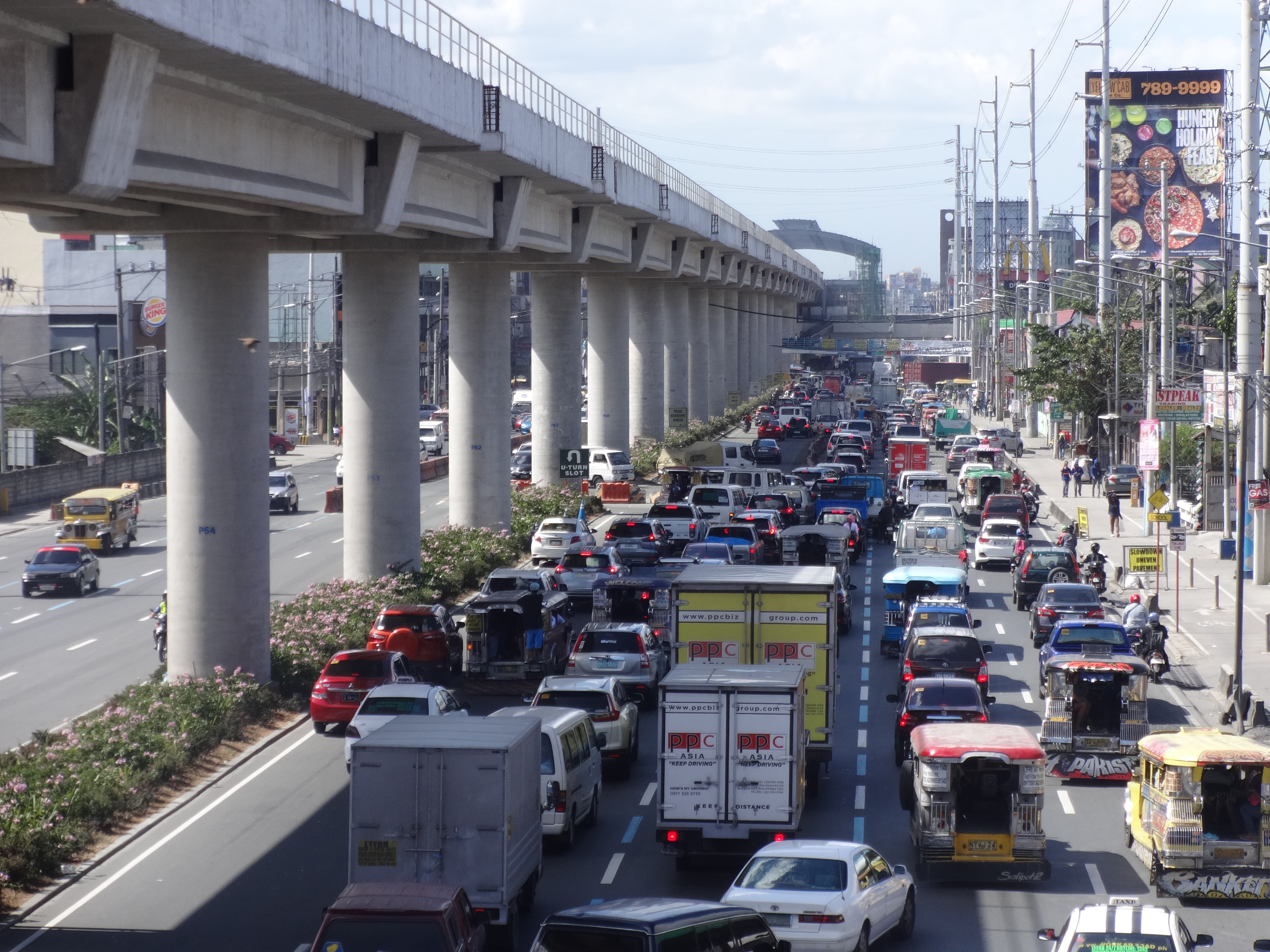
The highway on the Cainta–Marikina border during rush hour

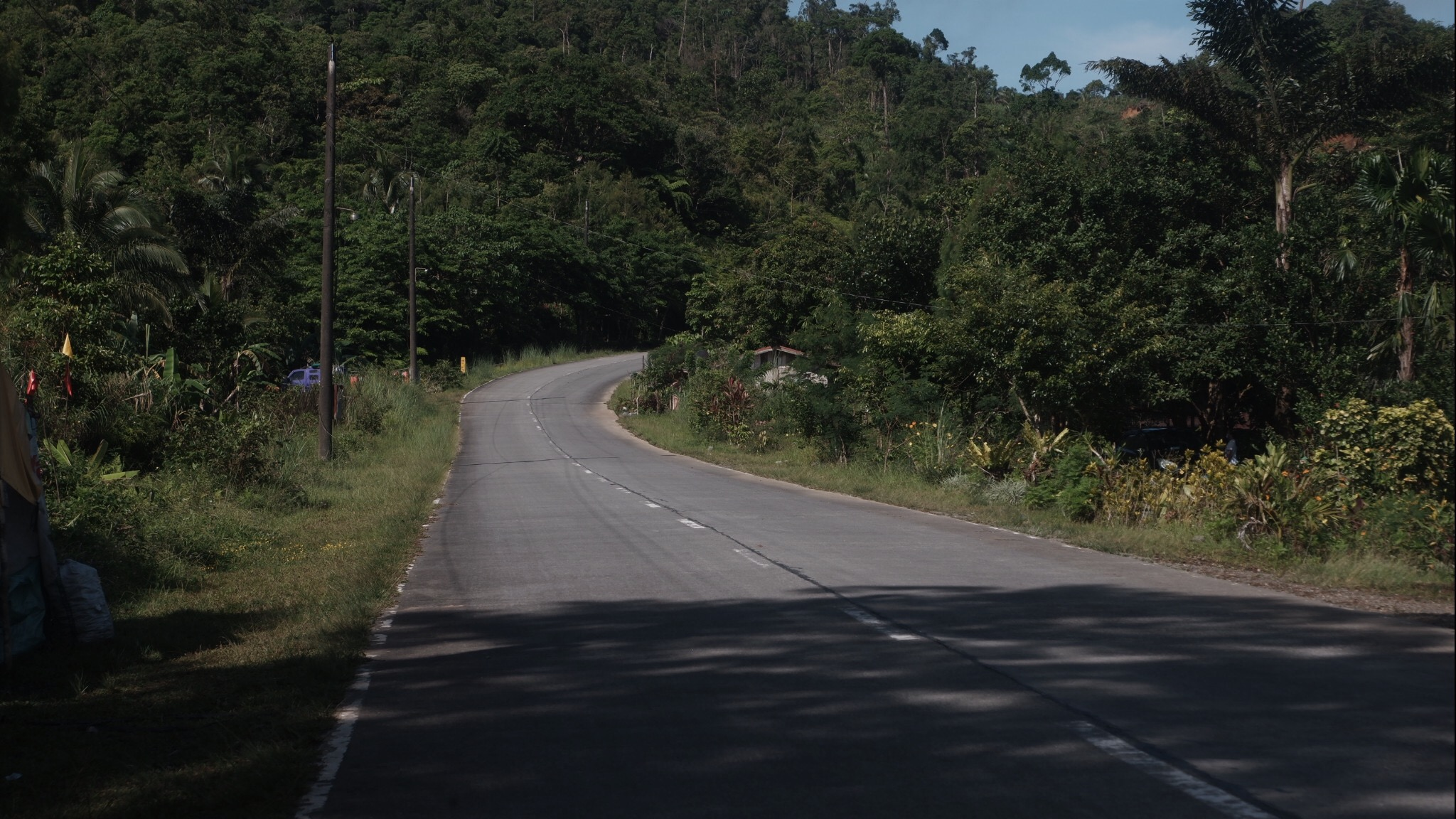
The highway in Infanta

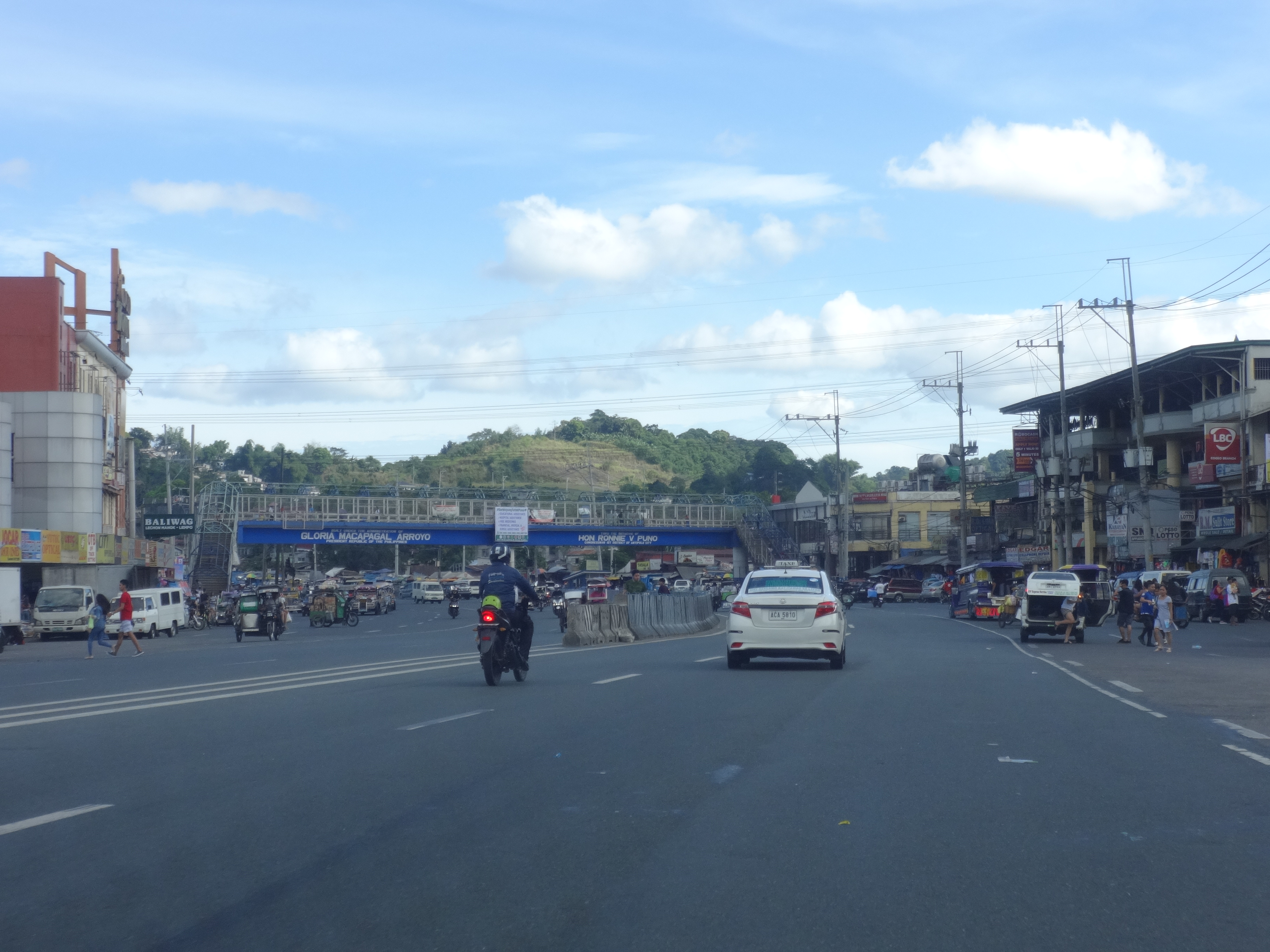
Section of Marilaque Highway near Cogeo Village, Antipolo

The Marikina–Infanta Highway begins as a physical continuation of Aurora Boulevard under the Katipunan Flyover in Quezon City. Entering Marikina, the highway slightly curves at the intersection with Andres Bonifacio Avenue, connecting it to Marikina city proper, then crosses the Marikina River. The Diosdado Macapagal Bridge that connects with C-5 merges in front of SM City Marikina. The LRTA's Line 2 System and the Cainta–Marikina sub-transmission line of Meralco run parallel and along the highway. The highway makes another slight curve away from Marikina as it enters Pasig, and soon runs over the Cainta–Marikina boundary. It goes straight towards the Cainta–Antipolo boundary towards the Masinag Junction with Sumulong Highway, where it continues to Cogeo in Antipolo. It reaches the foothills of the Sierra Madre and traverses the municipalities of Tanay in Rizal, Santa Maria in Laguna, and Infanta in Quezon. In Infanta, the highway’s eastern terminus is at its intersection with the Famy–Real–Infanta Road, just southwest of the town proper.

This divided highway features U-turn slots and bike lanes. Several establishments, such as the Riverbanks Center, SM City Marikina, Ayala Malls Feliz, Robinsons Metro East, Sta. Lucia East Grand Mall, and SM City Masinag, are primary landmarks accessible by the road. Meralco sub-transmission lines line the highway from the Cainta–Masinag segment up to Santa Maria, Laguna and on to Infanta, Quezon.

From Antipolo to Infanta, the Marikina–Infanta Highway is a standard, 2-6 lane road divided by lane markings typical of national highways in the provinces. Road size varies depending on the density of the location and the engineering district, wherein numerous road widening may occur, as determined by the Department of Public Works and Highways (DPWH).

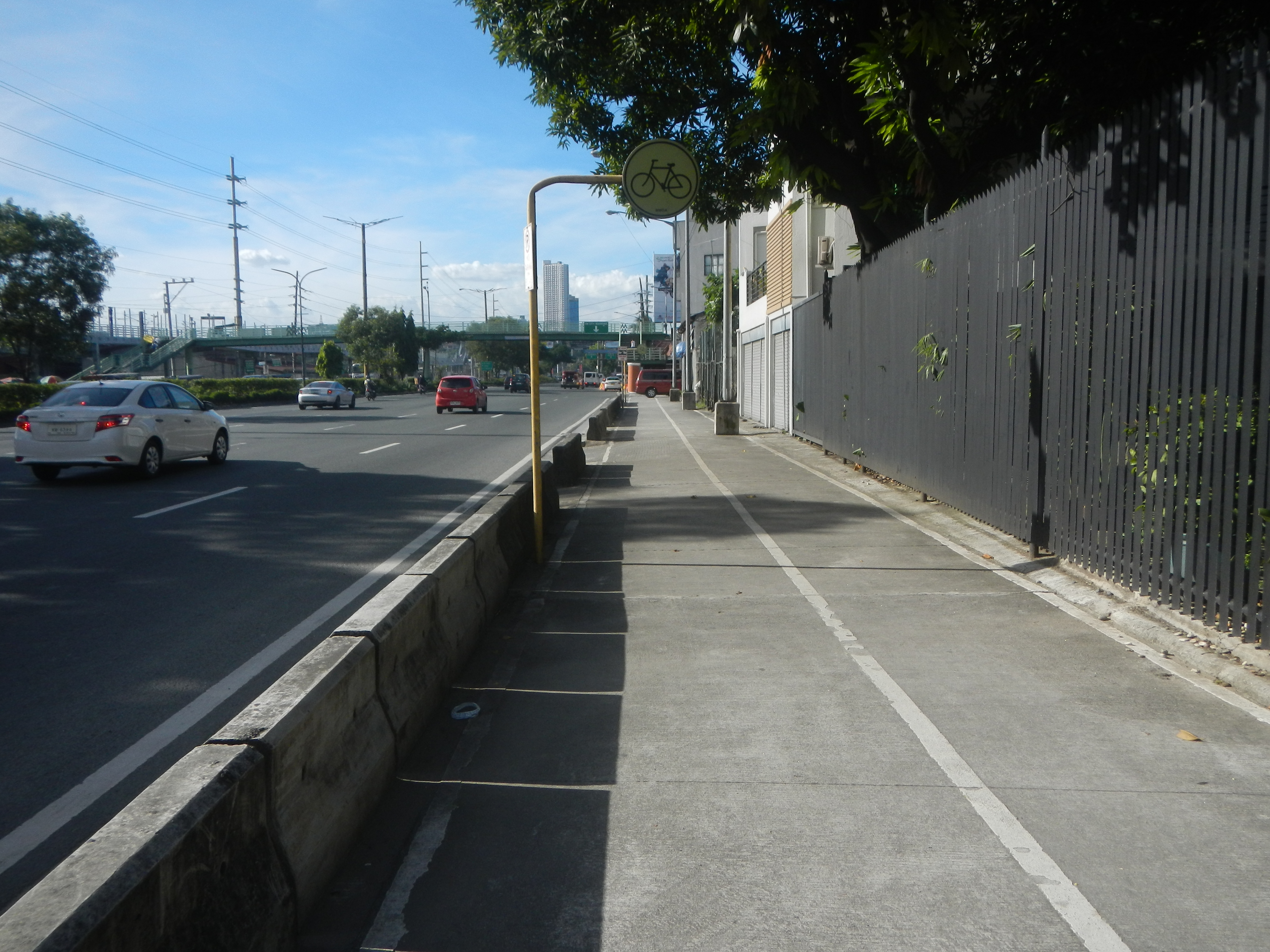
The Class I bicycle lane along Marikina–Infanta Highway across Santolan station

The highway from Evangelista Avenue and Old J.P. Rizal Road in Marikina to Sumulong Highway in Antipolo has one-way Class I bicycle lanes with a length of 4.57 kilometers (2.84 mi) and a width of 1.1 to 1.2 meters (3.6 to 3.9 ft), which were established by the Metropolitan Manila Development Authority (MMDA) in 2012. In the 2020s, this was expanded with Class II paint-separated one-way bicycle lanes from the start of the highway up to Evangelista Avenue and Old J.P. Rizal Road as part of the Metropolitan Bike Lane Network.

=== Alternative names ===
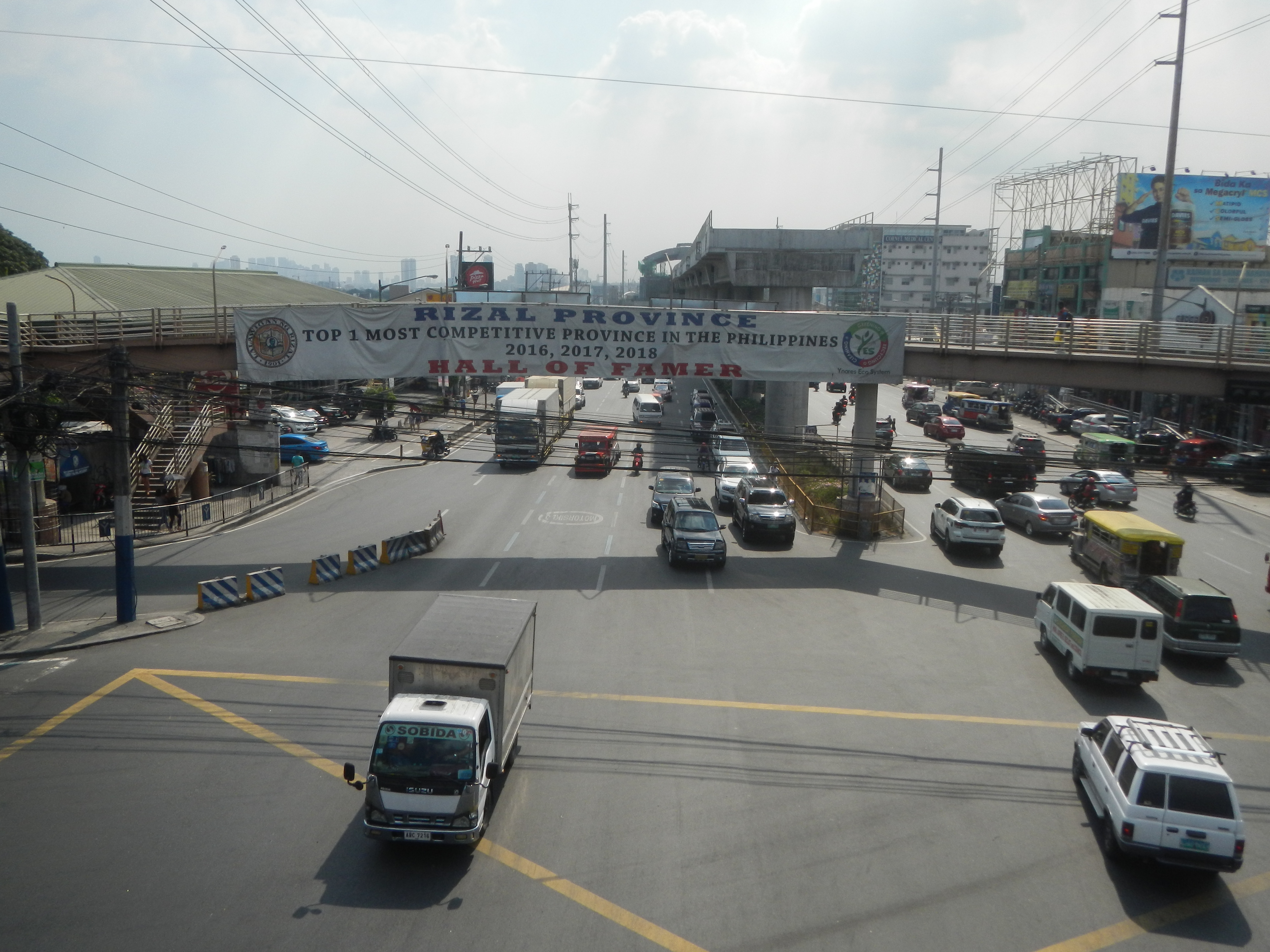
Masinag Junction looking west towards Marikina

The highway's section in Cainta and Antipolo, particularly from Masinag Junction to the Rizal–Metro Manila boundary, is officially known as Marikina Diversion Road, as it diverts motorists away from the city proper of Marikina. It is also known as Marilaque Highway, from an acronym of the places it passes: Marikina (or Manila), Rizal, Laguna, and Quezon. Street signs tend to bear the Marilaque name for convenience and memorability.

Marikina–Infanta Highway or Marikina–Infanta Road was also known as Marcos Highway before being renamed after President Ferdinand Marcos was overthrown in the 1986 People Power Revolution.

=== Route numbers ===
Since 2014, when the DPWH began implementing the new route numbering system, the highway's section from Katipunan Avenue to Sumulong Highway has been a component of National Route 59 (N59) of the Philippine highway network. The rest of the road is designated as National Route 601-1 (N601-1), having been a tertiary national road until its upgrade to secondary road in 2025.

== History ==
The highway existed as far back as the American colonial era as Highway 55, which included present-day Recto Avenue, Legarda Street, Magsaysay Boulevard, and Aurora Boulevard.

In the 1970s, the highway was developed during the administration of Ferdinand Marcos as Marikina Diversion Road. Construction of the current highway began in 1993 with an estimated cost of over ₱1 billion.

== Intersections ==
Province	City/Municipality	km	mi	Destinations	Notes
Quezon City				N11 (Katipunan Avenue (C-5))	Western terminus. Traffic light intersection. Continues westward as N59 (Aurora Boulevard).
Marikina				N601-1 (A. Bonifacio Avenue)	Eastbound ramp and westbound at-grade intersection. Access to Marikina-Infanta Highway eastbound via U-turn slot.
Marikina				Major Dizon Street	Eastbound access only. Access to Brgy. Industrial Valley Complex and Quezon City.
Marikina				FVR Road	Half partial clover interchange (westbound) and half half diamond interchange (eastbound). FVR Road's access to eastbound Marilaque Highway is provided by an access road to Major Dizon Street.
Marikina River				Marcos Bridge	
Marikina				SM City Marikina Access Road	Westbound access only. Access to SM City Marikina
Marikina				Diosdado Macapagal Bridge	Westbound entrance and eastbound exit. Access to Quezon City via FVR Road.
Marikina				Old J.P. Rizal Street / Evangelista Avenue	Access to Old J.P. Rizal Street via U-turn slot. Access to Evangelista Avenue via the FVR Road and Major Dizon interchanges. Access to Brgy. Kalumpang (Old J.P. Rizal Street) and Pasig (Evangelista Avenue). (Note: Most maps show the whole intersection as a part of Marikina)
Pasig				Eulogio Amang Rodriguez Avenue / J.P. Rizal Street	Eastbound/westbound access only. Access from opposite direction via U-turn slot.
Pasig–Marikina boundary				Nicanor Roxas Street / Emerald Drive / F. Mariano Avenue	Access from opposite direction via U-turn slot
Metro Manila–Rizal boundary	Marikina-Pasig-Cainta boundary			Robinsons Metro East Access Road	Eastbound access only to Robinsons Metro East
Metro Manila–Rizal boundary	Marikina-Pasig-Cainta boundary			Sta. Lucia East Access Road	Eastbound access to Sta. Lucia East Grand Mall
Metro Manila–Rizal boundary	Marikina-Pasig-Cainta boundary			Ditchoy Street / Dasdasan Street	Eastbound access only towards residential streets of Barangay San Roque.
Marikina				N601 (Felix Avenue) / Gil Fernando Avenue	Access from opposite directions via U-turn slot. Former traffic light intersection.
Rizal	Antipolo			Golden Meadows Avenue	Eastbound access only.
Rizal	Antipolo			Doña Justina Road (Filinvest East)	Westbound access only.
Rizal	Antipolo			Napoleon Street (Kingsville Subdivision)	Westbound access only.
Rizal	Antipolo			SM City Masinag Access Road	Westbound access only. Access to SM City Masinag
Rizal	Antipolo			N59 / N601-1 (Sumulong Highway)	Traffic light intersection; also known as Masinag Junction. Route number change from N59 to N601-1.
Rizal	Antipolo			TOCS Avenue	Access to Tres Hermanas Subdivision, Oro Vista 2 Subdivision, and Marikina via Brgy. Cupang.
Rizal	Antipolo			Seville Street	Access to Sumulong Highway.
Rizal	Antipolo			Dona Vicente Avenue	Access to Penafrancia Subdivision
Rizal	Antipolo			Cuenco Avenue	Access to Pagrai Hills Subdivision.
Rizal	Antipolo			Siruna Road	Access to Sitio Siruna, Brgy. Mambugan, and Sumulong Highway.
Rizal	Antipolo			Olalia Road / GSIS Avenue	Access from opposite direction via U-turn slot. Former traffic light intersection. Access to Cogeo Village (GSIS Avenue), and Antipolo Town Proper (Olalia Road).
Rizal	Antipolo			Bayugo–Buliran Road	Access to Padilla (Bagong Nayon 2).
Rizal	Baras			Pinugay Road	
Rizal	Tanay			J.P. Rizal Avenue (Tanay–Sampaloc Road)	
Laguna	Santa Maria				Four unnamed roads toward Santa Maria town proper via Brgys. Matalinting, Paoo, Parang ng Buho, and Cueva
Quezon	Infanta, Quezon			N601 (Famy–Real–Infanta Road)	Eastern terminus
1.000 mi = 1.609 km; 1.000 km = 0.621 mi: Incomplete access; Route transition

== Landmarks ==
This is from its western end at the Katipunan Avenue and C-5 Road intersection up to its eastern end at its intersection with N601:

Quezon City

- C5-Katipunan interchange
- SM Blue Residences

Marikina

- Riverbanks Center
- Marcos Bridge (Marikina River)
- SM City Marikina
- Diosdado Macapagal Bridge
- BFCT Terminal
- LRT-2 line bridge
- Santolan station
- Marikina–Pasig station

Pasig

- LRT-2 depot
- Ayala Malls Feliz
- Robinsons Metro East

Cainta, Rizal

- Sta. Lucia Mall
- APT Studios
- Marikina-Cainta Boundary Bridge

Antipolo, Rizal

- SM City Masinag
- National Shrine and Parish of Saint Therese of the Child Jesus
- Antipolo station
- Masinag Market
- SM Center Downtown Antipolo
- Wilcon Depot
- Heaven's Gate
- Sto. Rosario Memorial Park
- Cogeo Market
- Marikina-Infanta Highway Bridge
- Providence Memorial Park
- Mount Puting Bato
- Cabading Arch

Baras, Rizal

- Palo Alto Subdivision
- Devil's Curve

Tanay, Rizal

- Sampaloc intersection
- Camp Gen. Mateo Capinpin
- Daraitan intersection

Infanta, Quezon

- Kakawayan Falls
- Marcos Highway eastern terminus

== Accidents ==
A section of the road near Palo Alto Subdivision in Tanay, Rizal, dubbed the "Devil's Curve", is a frequent site for motorcyclists performing dangerous stunts due to the sharp curved roads. This frequently results in major accidents. According to the PNP Highway Patrol Group, 158 accidents were reported along the highway in 2024, with 110 occurring in the Palo Alto area. In 2025, one person was killed after a bus overturned along the highway in Infanta, Quezon, despite a ban on buses and other heavy vehicles from using the highway.
