= Marikina–Pasig station =

LRT Line 2 station in Marikina

Marikina–Pasig
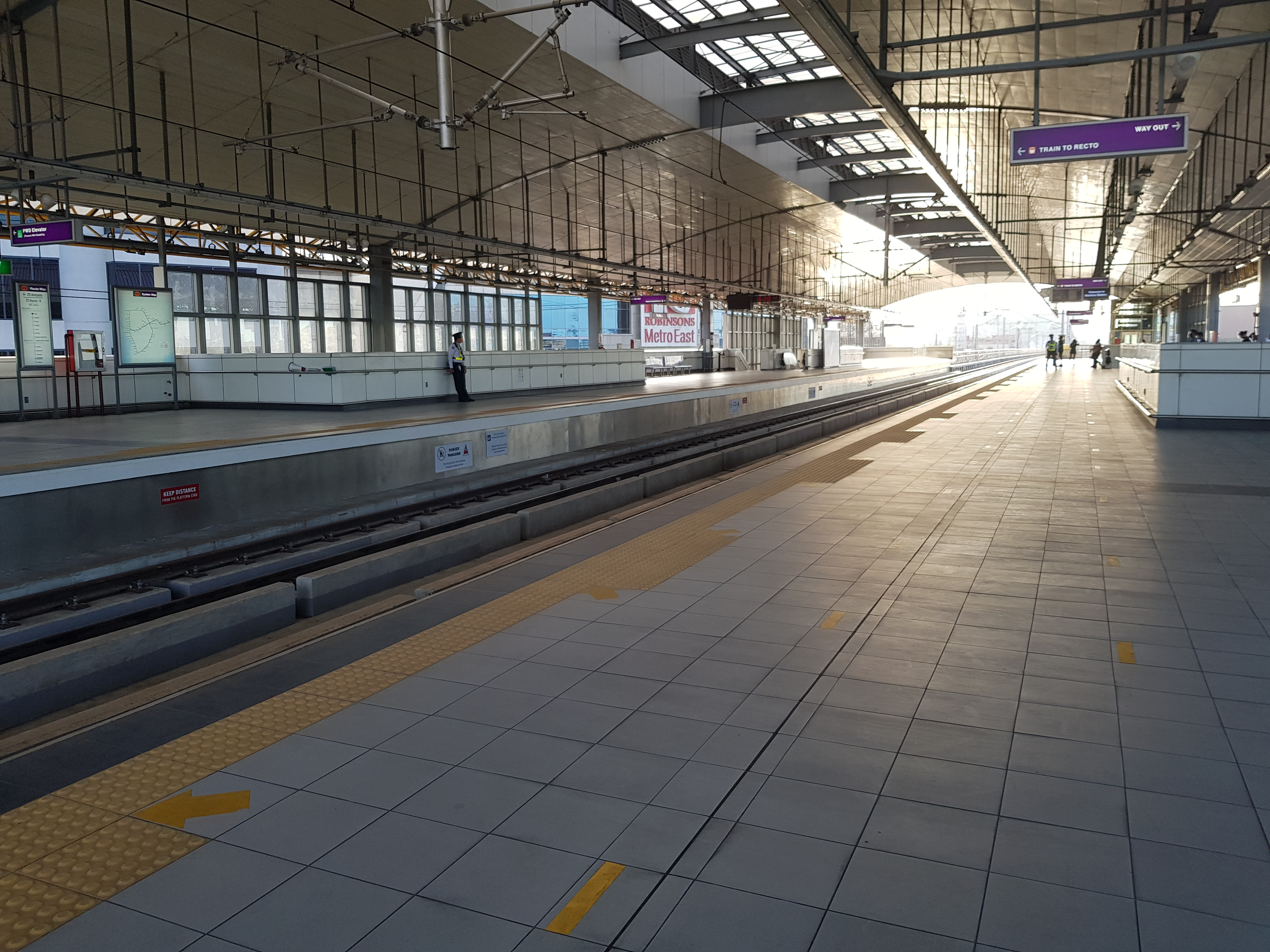

General information
- Other names: Emerald; Marikina (Note: This name was briefly used in 2021 and is still currently used in route maps, fare matrices, ticket machines, and social media advisories.)
- Location: Marikina–Infanta Highway, San Roque, Marikina, Metro Manila; Philippines
- Coordinates: 14°37′13″N 121°6′1″E
- Owner: Department of Transportation; Light Rail Transit Authority
- Line: LRT Line 2
- Platforms: 2 (2 side)
- Tracks: 2
- Connections: 3 Antipolo - Quiapo

Construction
- Structure type: Elevated
- Parking: Yes (Sta. Lucia East Grand Mall, Robinsons Metro East)
- Cycle facilities: Yes
- Accessible: Concourse: Both entrances Platforms: All platforms

Other information
- Status: Operational
- Station code: PL12

History
- Opened: July 5, 2021; 5 years ago
- Former names: Midtown Subdivision, Emerald

Services
Preceding station	Manila LRT	Following station
Antipolo Terminus	LRT Line 2	Santolan towards Recto
Track layout
Location
- Location within Metro Manila Location within Luzon Location within Philippines

Marikina–Pasig station is an elevated Light Rail Transit (LRT) station located on the LRT Line 2 (LRT-2) system in San Roque, Marikina, near the tripoint boundary of Pasig, Metro Manila and Cainta, Rizal. The station is situated on the stretch of Marikina–Infanta Highway near the intersection of Gil Fernando Avenue–Felix Avenue and is named after the cities of Marikina and Pasig which the station straddles between.

Marikina–Pasig station serves as the twelfth station for trains headed to Antipolo and the second station for trains headed to Recto. This is the line's last station in Metro Manila from Recto station before heading to the line's eastern terminus at Antipolo.

== History ==
The East Extension was suggested in 1999 as part of the Metro Manila Urban Transportation Integration Study (MMUTIS), which advocated for extending the LRT Line 2 toward Antipolo. Initially, the proposed station was referred to as Midtown Subdivision during the planning phase.

Marikina–Pasig station was constructed as part of the extension, which calls for a 3.8-kilometer (2.4 mi) extension eastward from Santolan station and the construction of two stations. The station during its inception was called "Emerald", but was renamed as "Marikina" in January 2021 prior to its opening. It was renamed a second time on October 31, 2021, as "Marikina–Pasig".

Construction of the East Extension began in 2015, while the Antipolo and Marikina–Pasig station broke ground in May 2017. The opening of the extension was supposed to be in the fourth quarter of 2020, but was postponed repeatedly due to the COVID-19 pandemic and various circumstances in integrating the east extension to the line's existing systems.

The east extension was inaugurated on July 1, 2021, and Marikina–Pasig station opened to the public on July 5, 2021. Rides for the East Extension were free of charge until July 18, 2021. When the station opened, the westbound platform was only operational for temporary bidirectional shuttle services since the integration works of the east extension to the line's existing systems was not completed. The eastbound platform became operable on September 3, 2021, after integration works were completed.

== Nearby landmarks ==
The station is directly connected to two shopping centers: Sta. Lucia East Grand Mall and Robinsons Metro East. It is also easily accessible to the residential areas of Barangay San Roque in Marikina via Liamzon, Ditchoy, and Dasdasan Streets. It is also accessible in nearby Sta. Lucia Residences and Q Plaza.

The station is also accessible via public transport stops along Marikina–Infanta Highway for those commuters heading to Ayala Malls Feliz and APT Studios, and along Gil Fernando Avenue for those commuters heading to Marikina City Hall, Marikina Sports Complex, Blue Wave Mall, S&R Marikina, and residential condominiums such as Tropicana Garden City, Marquinton and Sienna Tower Residences, which lie some distance from the station. The station is one of the largest train stations built in Line 2 and it is expected as one of the line's busiest stations due to its location at the busiest thoroughfare along Marikina–Infanta Highway.

== Transportation links ==
There is a jeepney and UV Express terminal in Robinsons Metro East. There is also a jeepney terminal at Sta. Lucia Grand East Mall. The station also serves a bus stop in Sta. Lucia East Grand Mall via Bus Route 3 (Antipolo–Quiapo) for direct trips going to and from Marikina, Pasig, Manila and Quezon City in Metro Manila and Cainta and Antipolo in Rizal. Taxis are available upon request.

== Gallery ==
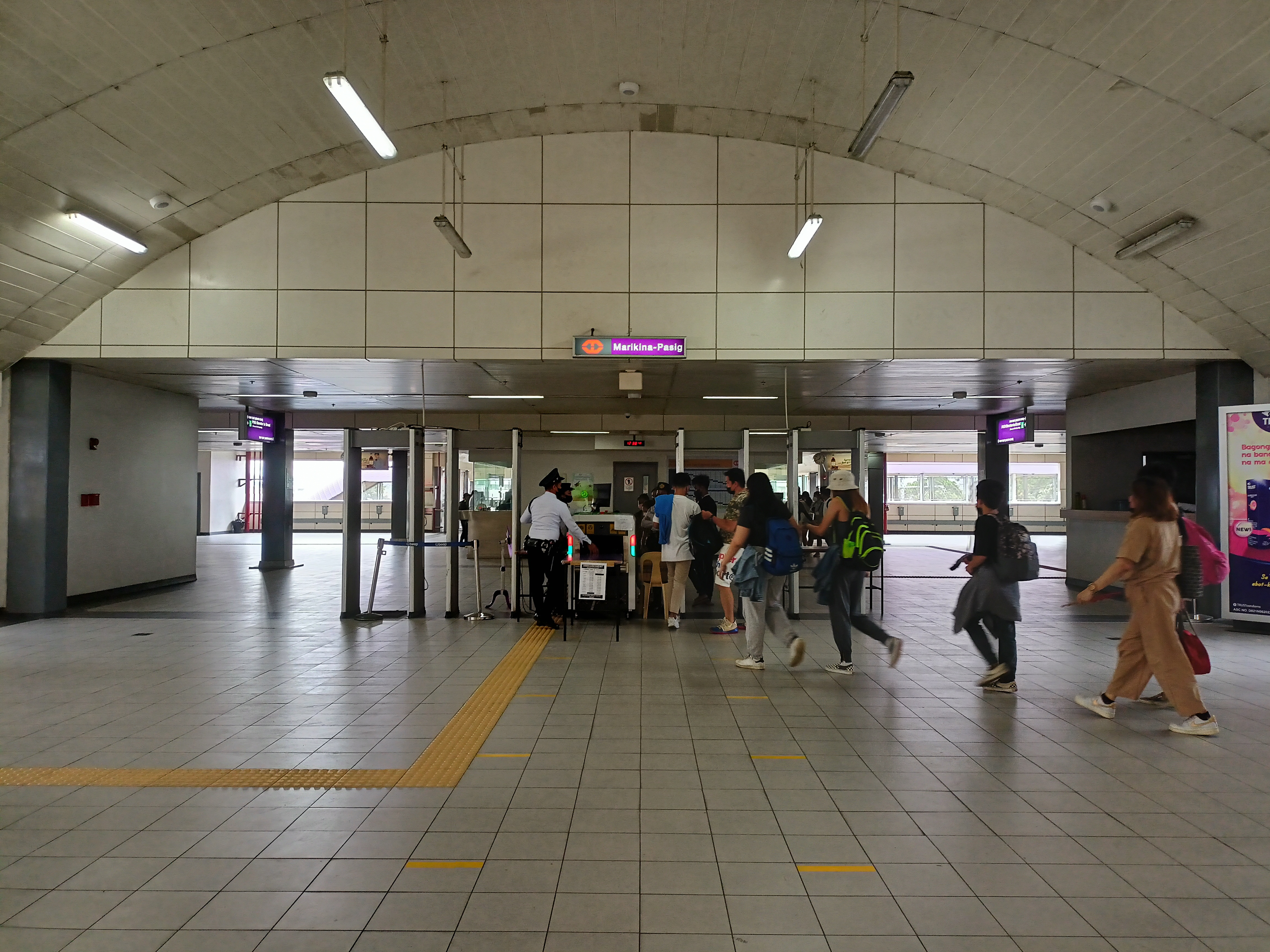
Marikina–Pasig station entrance

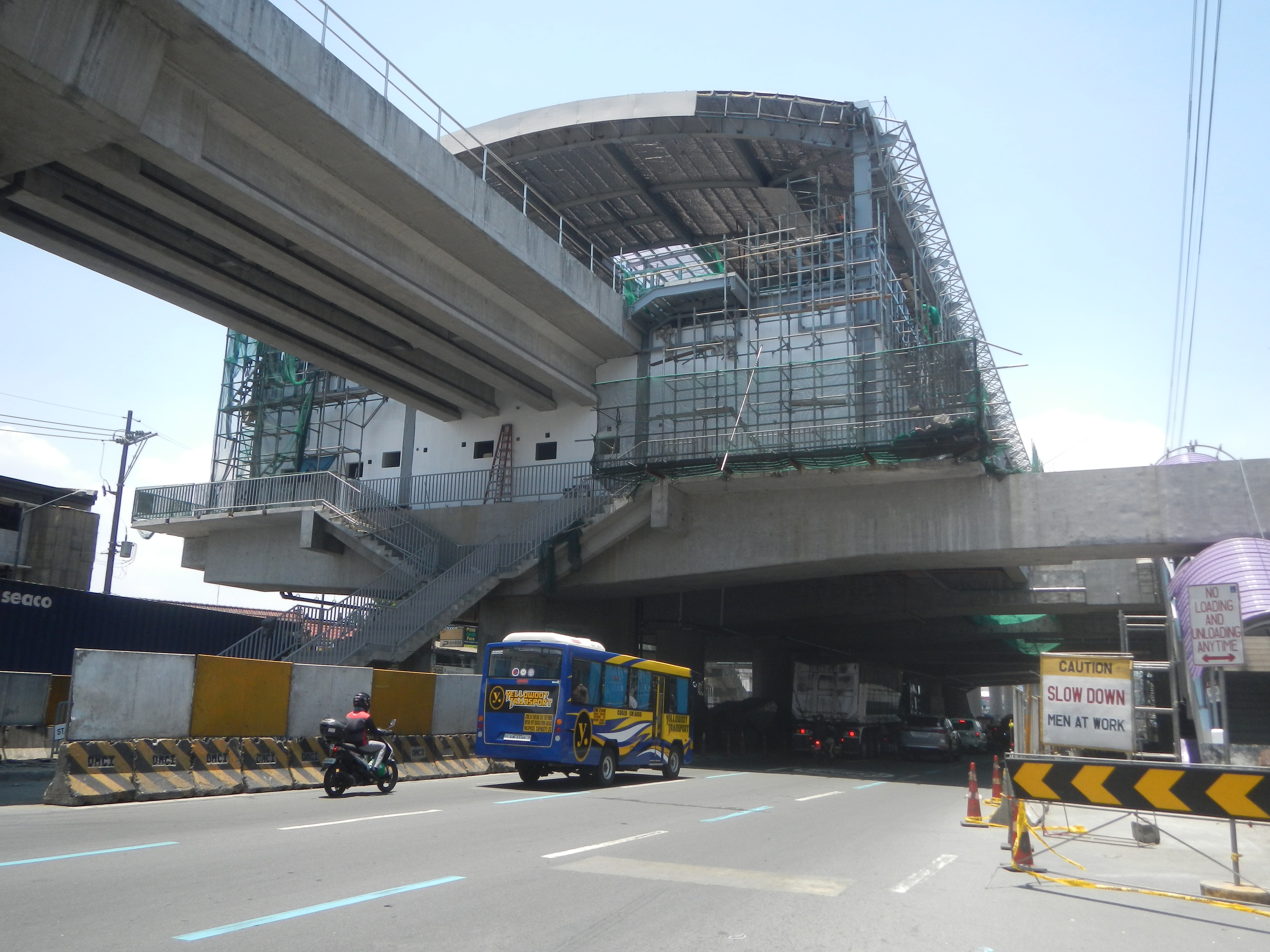
Station under construction, May 2019

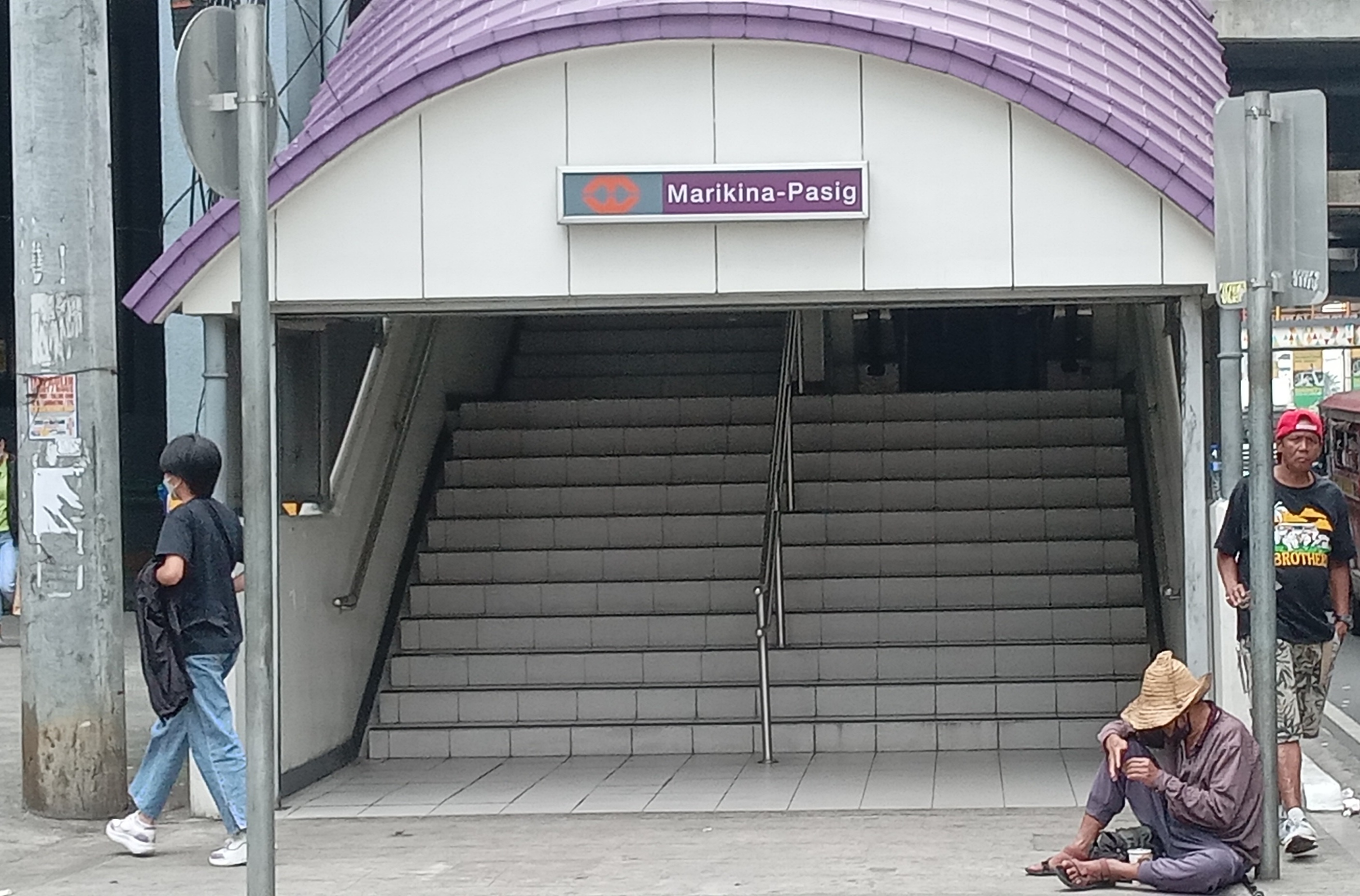
An entrance of the station, with the renamed signage

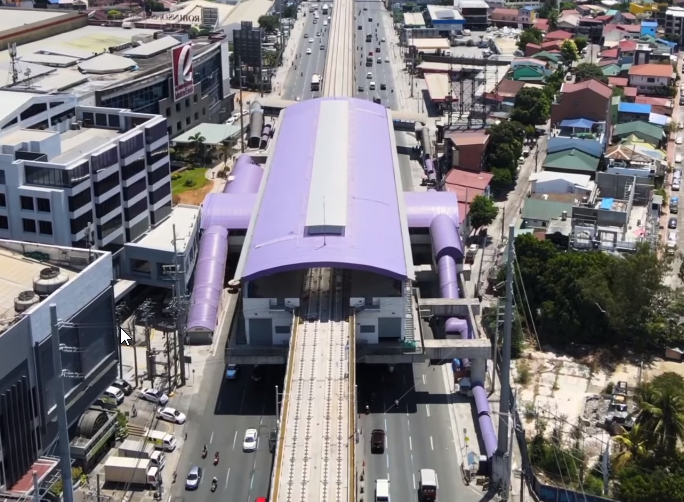
Aerial view of the station
