= APT Studios =

Television studio in Cainta, Rizal, Philippines

- Former names: KB Entertainment Studios

General information
- Status: Completed
- Type: Television Studio
- Location: Marcos Highway, Sitio Halang, Brgy. San Isidro, Cainta, Rizal
- Current tenants: Eat Bulaga! (2018–24) TAPE Inc. (2018–24)
- Opened: December 8, 2018; 7 years ago (as APT Studios)
- Closed: March 2, 2024; 2 years ago
- Owner: APT Entertainment

Design and construction
- Architect: Buensalido Architects

Other information
- Seating capacity: 700

APT Studios is a television studio located at Marcos Highway, Barangay San Isidro, Cainta, Rizal, just near the boundary with Marikina, part of Metro Manila.

== Use and shows ==
=== Eat Bulaga! ===
It is formerly the home studio of the longest-running noontime variety show in the Philippines, Eat Bulaga!, since its transfer to the studio on December 8, 2018 until January 5, 2024 as part of its year-long celebration of the show's 40th anniversary.

On November 23, 2018, a short teaser about the show's transfer to its new studio was aired and posted on the show's social media accounts. It also uploaded several throwback videos on their social media platforms about the history of their former studios like the Broadcast City (1979–1987), Celebrity Sports Plaza (1987–1989, 1994–1995), ABS-CBN Studio 1 (1989–1994) and Broadway Centrum (1995–2018). It was on December 1, 2018, when the hosts officially announced the transfer of the show to its new studio now known as APT Studios.

On December 8, 2018, Eat Bulaga! aired its first live episode from the APT Studios. The opening number was led by the winners of Hype Kang Bata Ka and the hosts of EB!, and it ended with the singing of the Eat Bulaga! theme song, including Senate President Tito Sotto, who usually appeared on the show during occasions. The said transfer of the show to its new studio is one of the highlights of its year-long celebration of its 40th anniversary on television.

TAPE Inc's new management suspended production of Eat Bulaga!, in which they prevented original hosts, Tito Sotto, Vic Sotto, and Joey De Leon from going live before the trio announced their departure from the production company on May 31, 2023. Furthermore, their co-hosts alongside many of the production team also left TAPE Inc.

=== Tahanang Pinakamasaya! ===
After the departure of the original hosts of Eat Bulaga! on May 31, 2023, TAPE Inc. continued to occupy the studio from June 5, 2023, when the show unveiled their new set of hosts, until the show became Tahanang Pinakamasaya from January 6 to March 2, 2024.

== COVID-19 pandemic ==
Due to the COVID-19 pandemic, live studio audiences were suspended as of March 9, 2020.
