= Robinsons Metro East =

- Robinsons Metro East in 2015.
- Location: Pasig, Metro Manila, Philippines
- Coordinates: 14°37′09″N 121°06′00″E
- Address: Marikina–Infanta Highway, Brgy. Dela Paz, Pasig
- Opened: August 31, 2001; 25 years ago
- Developer: Robinsons Land
- Manager: Robinsons Malls
- Owner: John Gokongwei
- Num. of stores: 400+ shops
- Num. of anchor tenants: 10
- Floor area: 121,000 m^{2} (1,300,000 ft^{2})
- Floors: 5 floors (4 upper levels and 1 basement level)
- Parking: 1,500+ cars (elevated indoor carparks and outdoor parkings)
- Public transit: 9 Sta. Lucia Grand Mall; Marikina–Pasig
- Website: robinsonsmalls.com

Robinsons Metro East (formerly known as Robinsons Place Metro East), is a shopping mall owned by Robinsons Malls. Robinsons Metro East is situated along Marikina–Infanta Highway, located at Barangay Dela Paz in Pasig, Metro Manila, Philippines, near the tripoint boundary of Marikina, Metro Manila and Cainta, Rizal Province. The mall opened on August 31, 2001, and is currently the 3rd largest mall in the Philippines owned by Robinsons Malls.

== History ==
The location was first occupied by a Uniwide Warehouse owned by Jimmy Gow's Uniwide Sales, Inc. and was subsequently sold to Gokongwei, who demolished the warehouse. Construction of the mall began in mid-1998, and Robinsons Metro East opened in 2001. The name "Metro East" refers to the fact that the mall is located in the eastern district of the Greater Manila Area, near the tripoint boundary of the cities of Pasig and Marikina in Metro Manila, and the municipality of Cainta, in Rizal Province.

On September 26, 2009, the mall's basement was flooded due to Typhoon Ketsana. This, in turn, led to the closure of the entire mall. Renovation of the mall began in August 2011 and was completed in 2012.

The mall is connected to the Marikina-Pasig station of the LRT Line 2. An extension of the mall that links to the station's concourse opened in 2022.

== Mall features ==
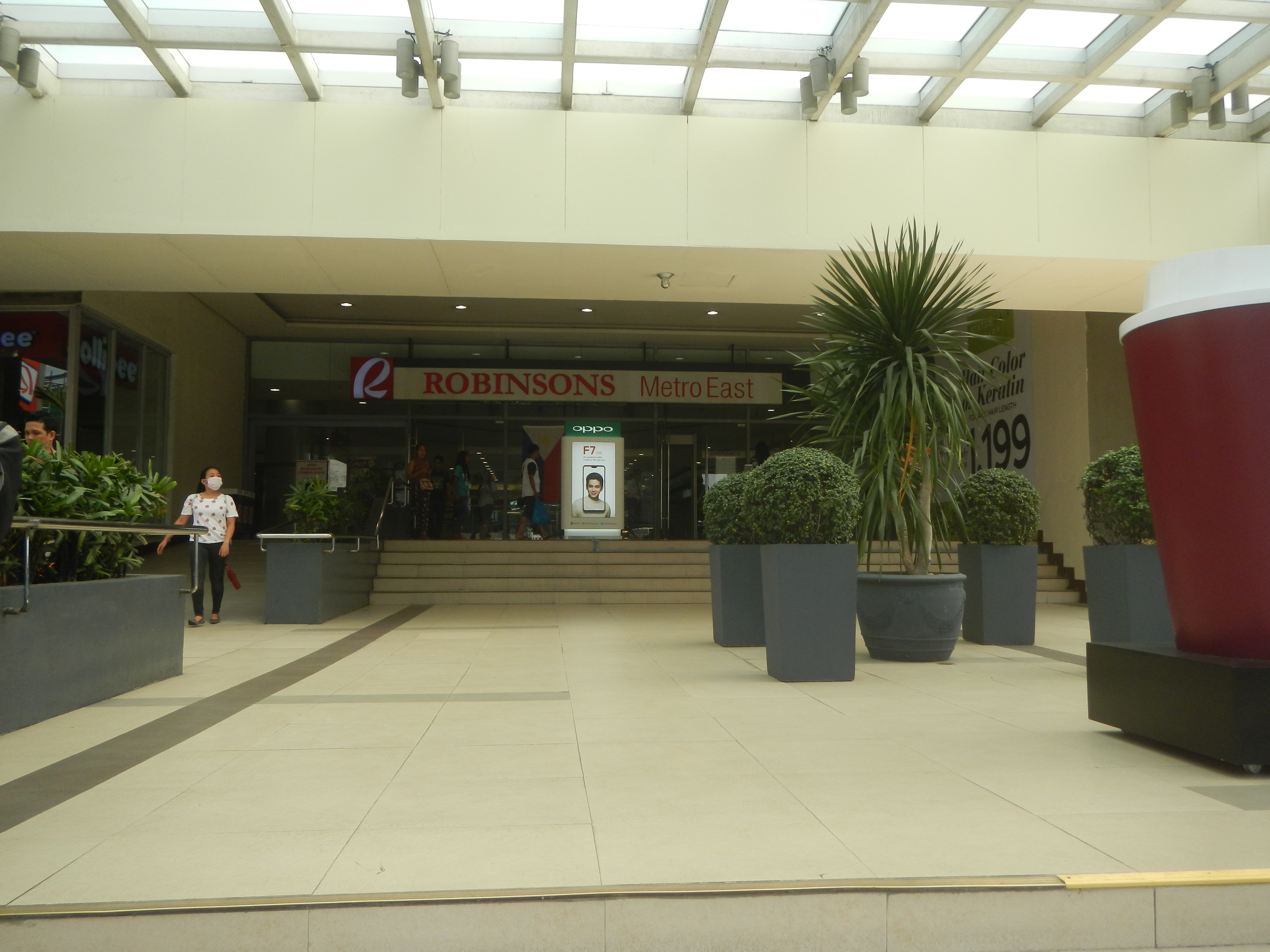
The mall's main entrance in 2018

The main building of Metro East is one of the largest structures along Marikina–Infanta Highway. The mall is a 5-level building with 4 upper levels and a basement level, features a 2-level department store, a supermarket, an appliance center, Toys R Us, and movie theaters. The mall also provides a 5-level elevated indoor car park on the mall's left side.

== See also ==
- Robinsons Galleria
- Sta. Lucia Mall
- SM City Marikina
