= Mount Puting Bato =

Mountain in San Luis, Antipolo, Philippines

Puting Bato
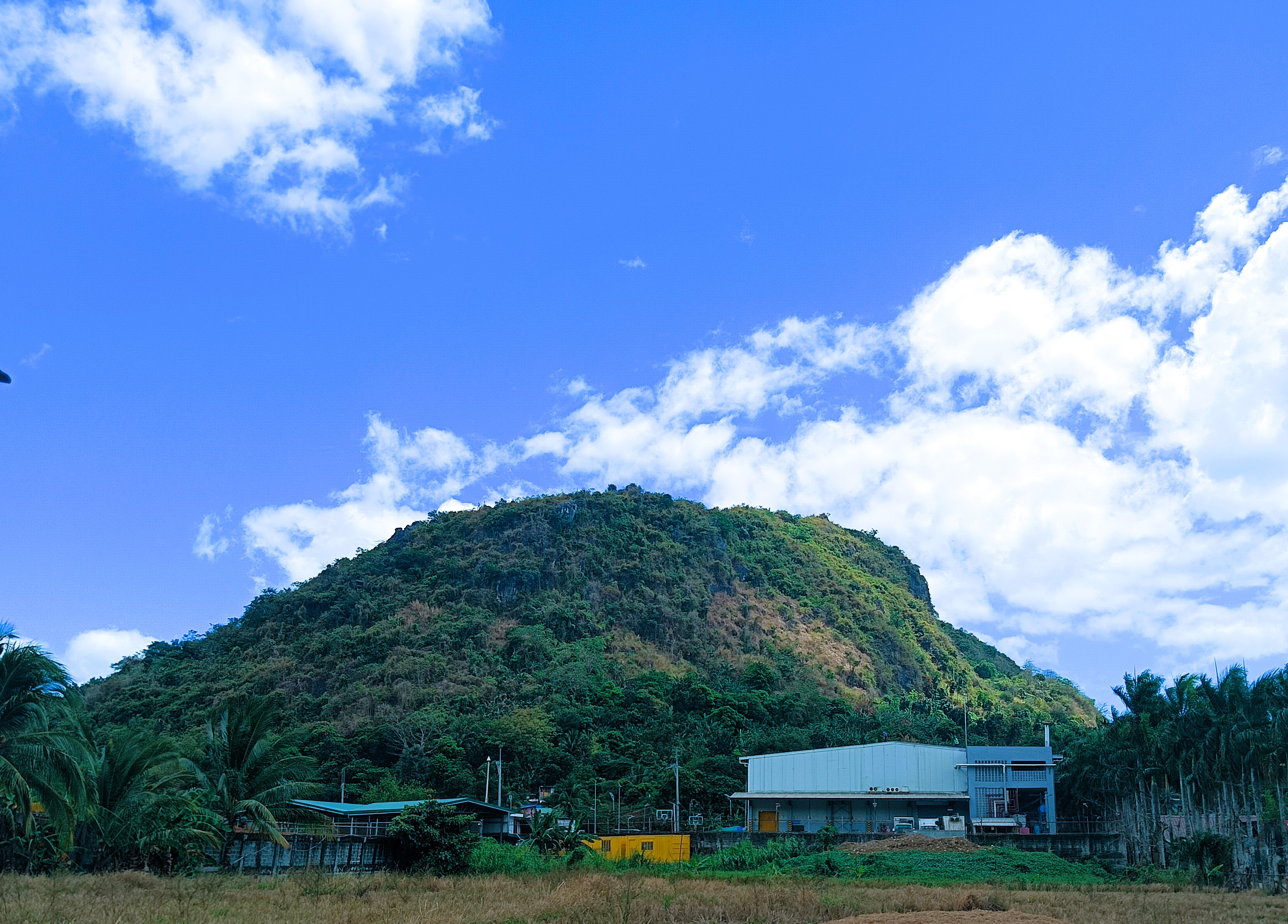
- Puting Bato as seen from Barangay Inarawan

Highest point
- Elevation: 120 m (390 ft)
- Coordinates: 14°37′16″N 121°12′17″E

Naming
- English translation: "White rock"

Geography
- Location within Philippines
- Country: Philippines
- Province: Rizal
- City: Antipolo

Mount Puting Bato, also locally known as simply Puting Bato, is a notable peak located in Antipolo, Rizal in the Philippines. Its name translates to "white rock" in English, characterized by the limestone present in the area. Over time, these formations have undergone weathering, leading to a gradual fading of their original coloration.

With its summit reaching above 120 feet (36.5 meters), the hill offers panoramic views of the other surrounding Antipolo hills and serves as a popular spot for both sunrise and sunset observations. Its summit features a prominent cross, making it a significant site during the Holy Week, especially for residents of Barangay San Luis, where it is situated.
