= Ayala Malls Feliz =

Shopping mall in Pasig, Philippines

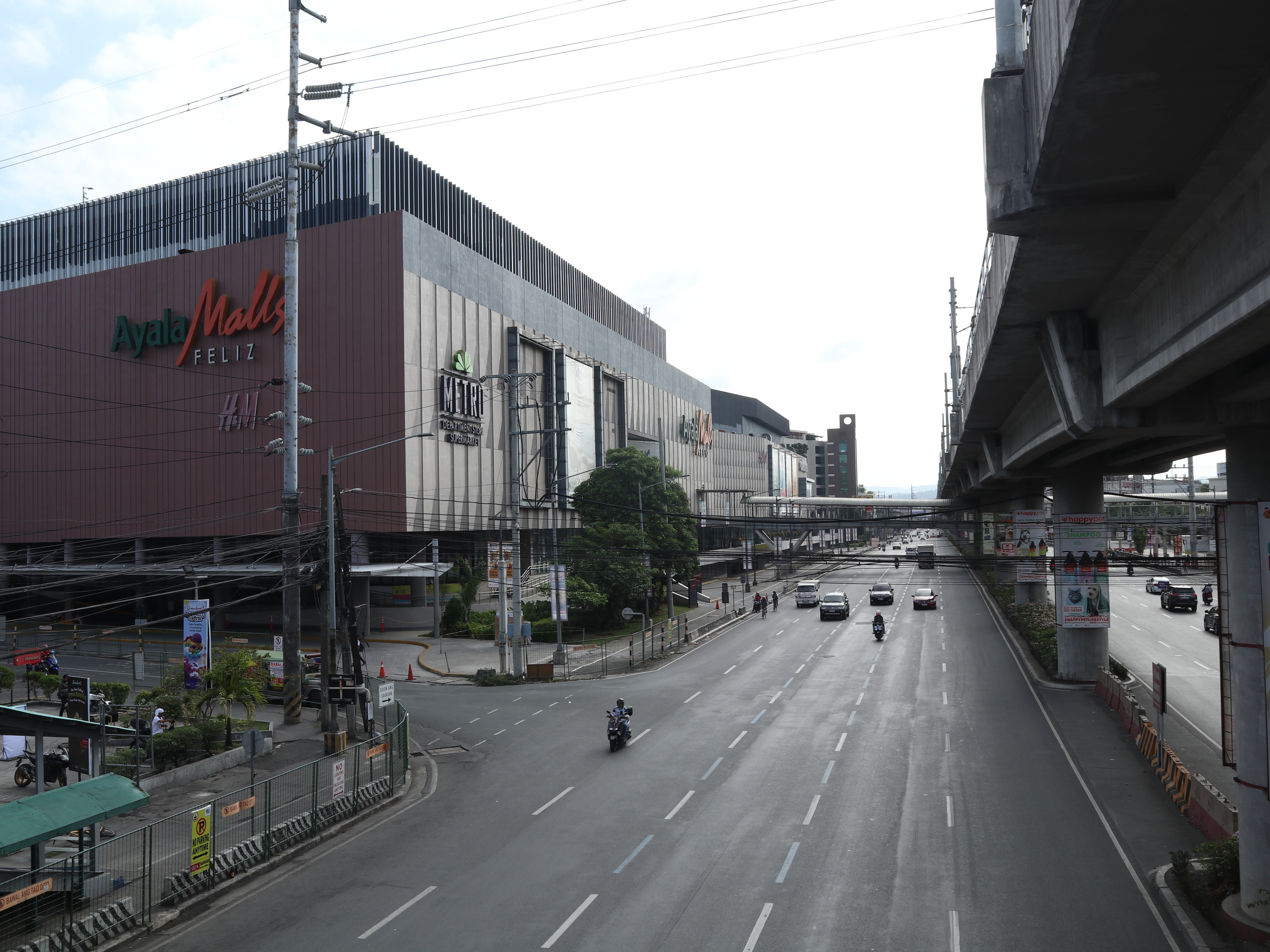
- The mall in 2024
- Location: Pasig, Metro Manila, Philippines
- Coordinates: 14°37′11″N 121°05′38″E
- Address: Marikina–Infanta Highway, Dela Paz, Pasig City 1610 Metro Manila
- Opened: December 21, 2017; 8 years ago
- Developer: Ayala Malls
- Manager: Ayala Malls
- Architect: Visionarch
- Num. of stores: TBA
- Floor area: 80,000 m^{2} (860,000 sq ft)
- Floors: 6 + 2 parking levels
- Public transit: 9 Ligaya; Marikina–Pasig
- Website: http://www.ayalamalls.com.ph/

View of Ayala Malls Feliz from the east

Ayala Malls Feliz (also known as Feliz Town Center) is a shopping mall developed and managed by Ayala Malls. It opened on December 21, 2017.

This is Ayala Malls' second mall in Pasig, after Ayala Malls The 30th. It is located along Marikina–Infanta Highway just near the boundary with Marikina.

== Etymology ==
The word "Feliz" (English: "happy") is a Spanish word, when translated into Tagalog, means "ligaya," which is the name of the intersection where the mall is located.

== Features ==
The mall has four levels, a central garden and events area which makes it the largest mall development by Ayala Malls for the year 2017.

The mall also features traditional amenities such as cinemas and recreational facilities. There is a sky park on the fifth floor that includes shops and restaurants, and it features one of the largest Timezone branches in the country, which opened in April 2018. The Timezone branch introduced a trampoline park in October 2021.

The mall features a Metro Department Store and Metro Supermarket as anchor tenants. It also houses global clothing retailers including a two-level H&M store as well as international fitness center Anytime Fitness and appliance stores like Automatic Centre.
