= N59 highway =

Highway in the Philippines

Route 59

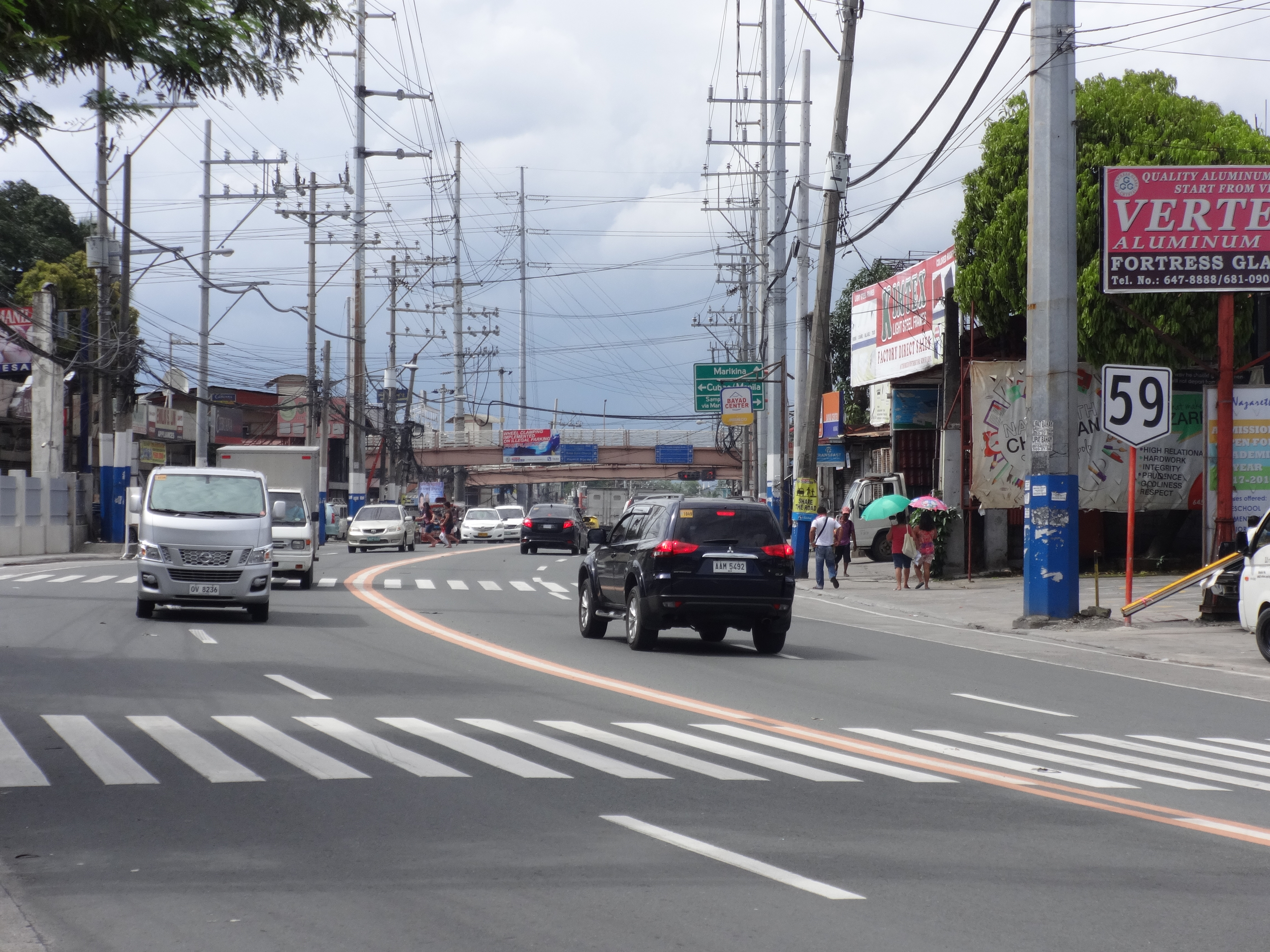
- N59 reassurance marker in Sumulong Highway, Antipolo

Route information
- Length: 19 km (12 mi)
- Existed: 2014–present

Major junctions
- East end: N60 / N600 in Antipolo, Rizal
- N601-1 in Antipolo, Rizal; N601 in Marikina; N601-1 in Marikina and Quezon City; N11 in Quezon City
- West end: AH 26 (N1) / N180 in Quezon City

Location
- Country: Philippines
- Major cities: Antipolo, Marikina, Pasig, Quezon City

Highway system
- Roads in the Philippines; Highways; Expressways; List
← N58	→ N60

National Route 59 (N59) is a primary national route that forms part of the Philippine highway network. It runs from Antipolo, Rizal to Cubao, Quezon City, Metro Manila.

== Route description ==
N59 follows a route that runs from Antipolo to Cainta in Rizal, entering Metro Manila through Pasig, then Marikina towards Quezon City. The highway connects most major regional centers and runs through different landscapes. It continues westward as the N180 highway and eastward as the N600 highway.

=== Sumulong Highway ===
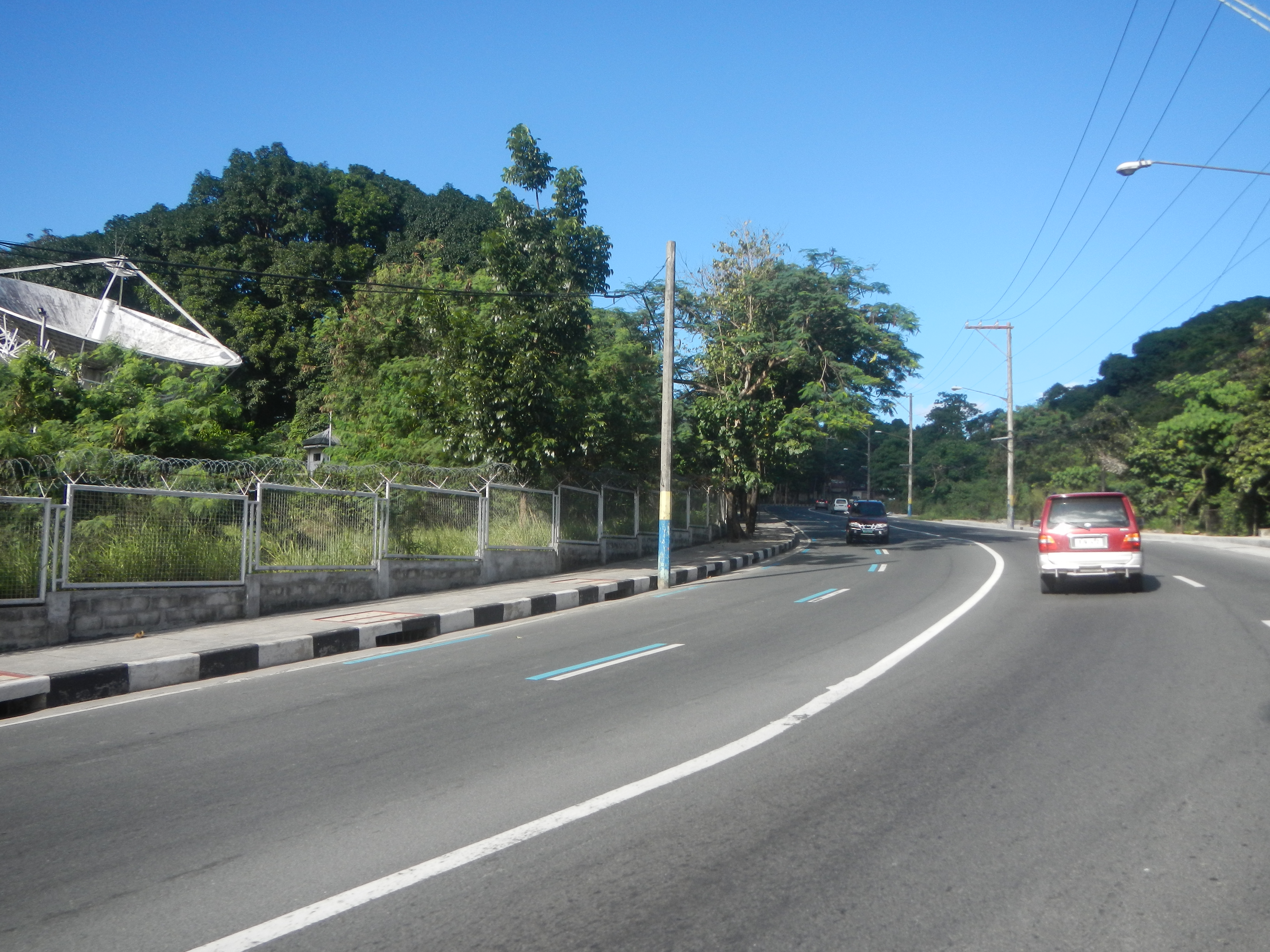
Sumulong Highway in Barangay Mambugan, Antipolo

N59 begins at Antipolo in Rizal at the endpoint of L. Sumulong Memorial Circle Road (N60/N600) in front of Robinsons Place Antipolo. The highway passes through different key locations at Antipolo, which is known for its scenic views of Metro Manila, given its mountainous terrain. The roadway goes downward until it meets with the Marikina-Infanta Highway at the Masinag Junction, where the N59 route turns left.

=== Marikina–Infanta Highway ===
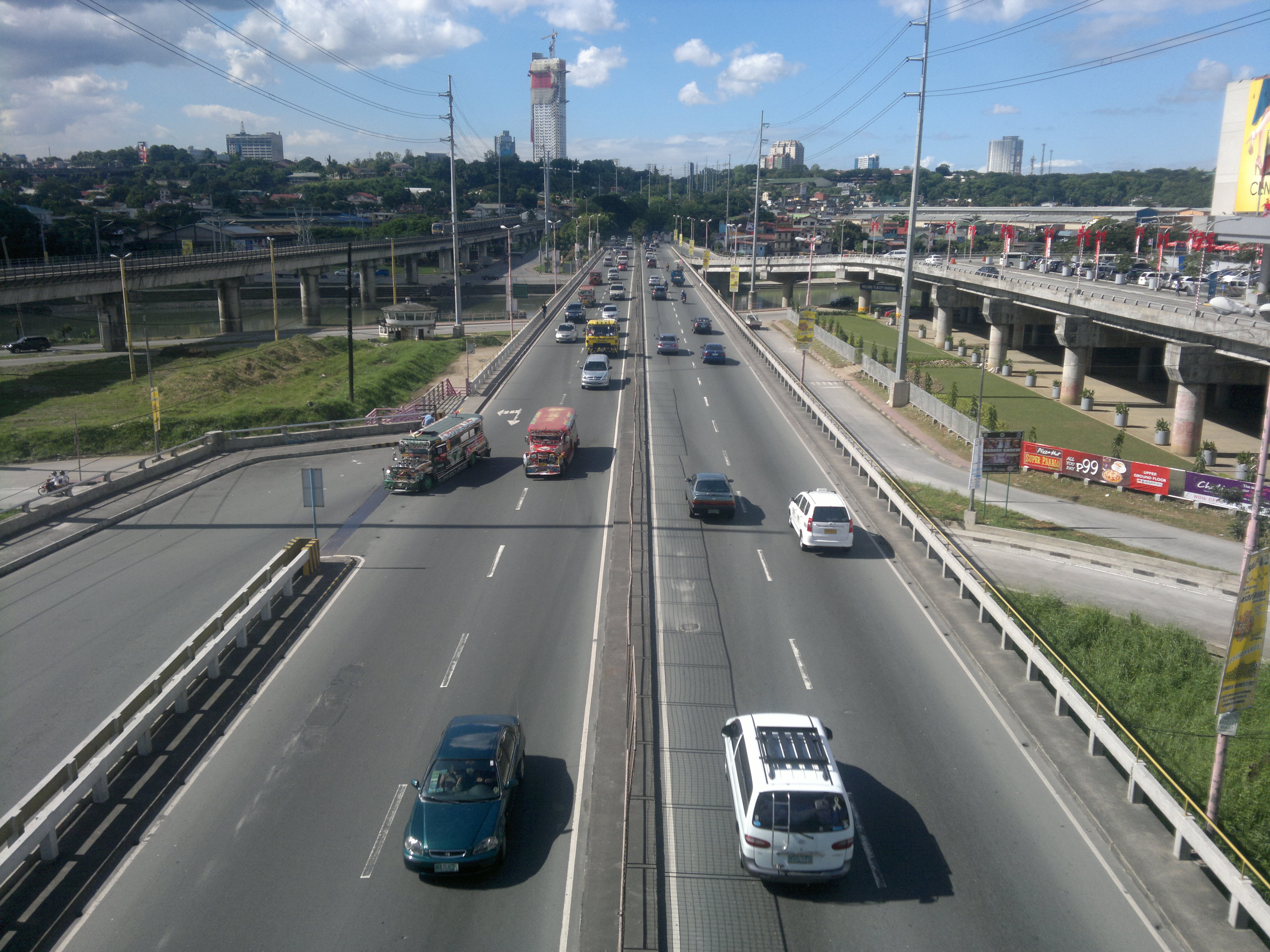
Marikina–Infanta Highway in Marikina

As soon as it turns left, the highway soon enters the Marikina–Infanta Highway (Marcos Highway), where it follows the LRT Line 2 from Masinag Junction, Antipolo, Rizal, where it begins on a straight route as it crosses over to Cainta. N59 enters Metro Manila in Pasig and Marikina at the Felix Avenue (N601-1) and Gil Fernando Avenue intersection. N59 then crosses the Marikina River, veering upwards in a curve towards its junction with A. Bonifacio Avenue (N601-1). It then enters Quezon City before terminating at C-5/Katipunan Avenue (N11) and Aurora Boulevard (N59) intersection. The LRT Line 2 utilizes the center island of Marikina-Infanta Highway on all segments of N59.

=== Aurora Boulevard ===
Entering Quezon City, N59 follows Aurora Boulevard, which runs on a four- to six-lane highway passing through intersections such as Anonas Street in Project 3, 20th Avenue in Project 4, and Araneta City streets in Cubao. It then terminates at its intersection with EDSA (N1/AH26), continuing westward after the intersection as N180 highway but still as Aurora Boulevard. The LRT Line 2 utilizes the center island of Aurora Boulevard on all segments.
