= Recto (disambiguation) =

Recto is the "front" side of a leaf of paper.

It may also refer to:

- Recto Avenue, a road in Manila, Philippines
- Recto station, an LRT station in Manila, Philippines
- Claro M. Recto, Filipino lawyer, jurist, writer, author, columnist, diplomat, and statesman
