= Manila Light Rail Transit System =

Urban rail system in the Philippines

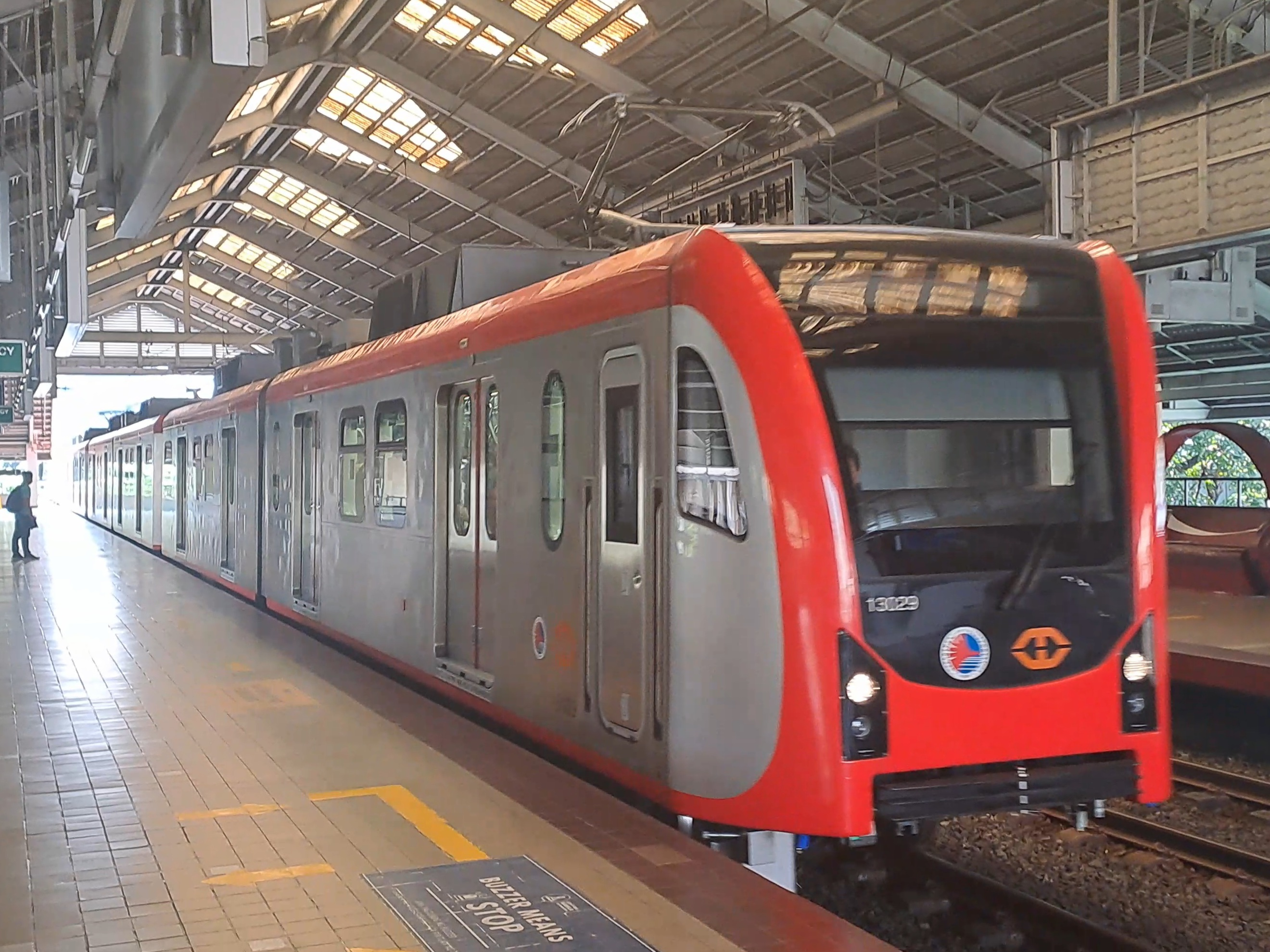
- A Line 1 train at Central Terminal station

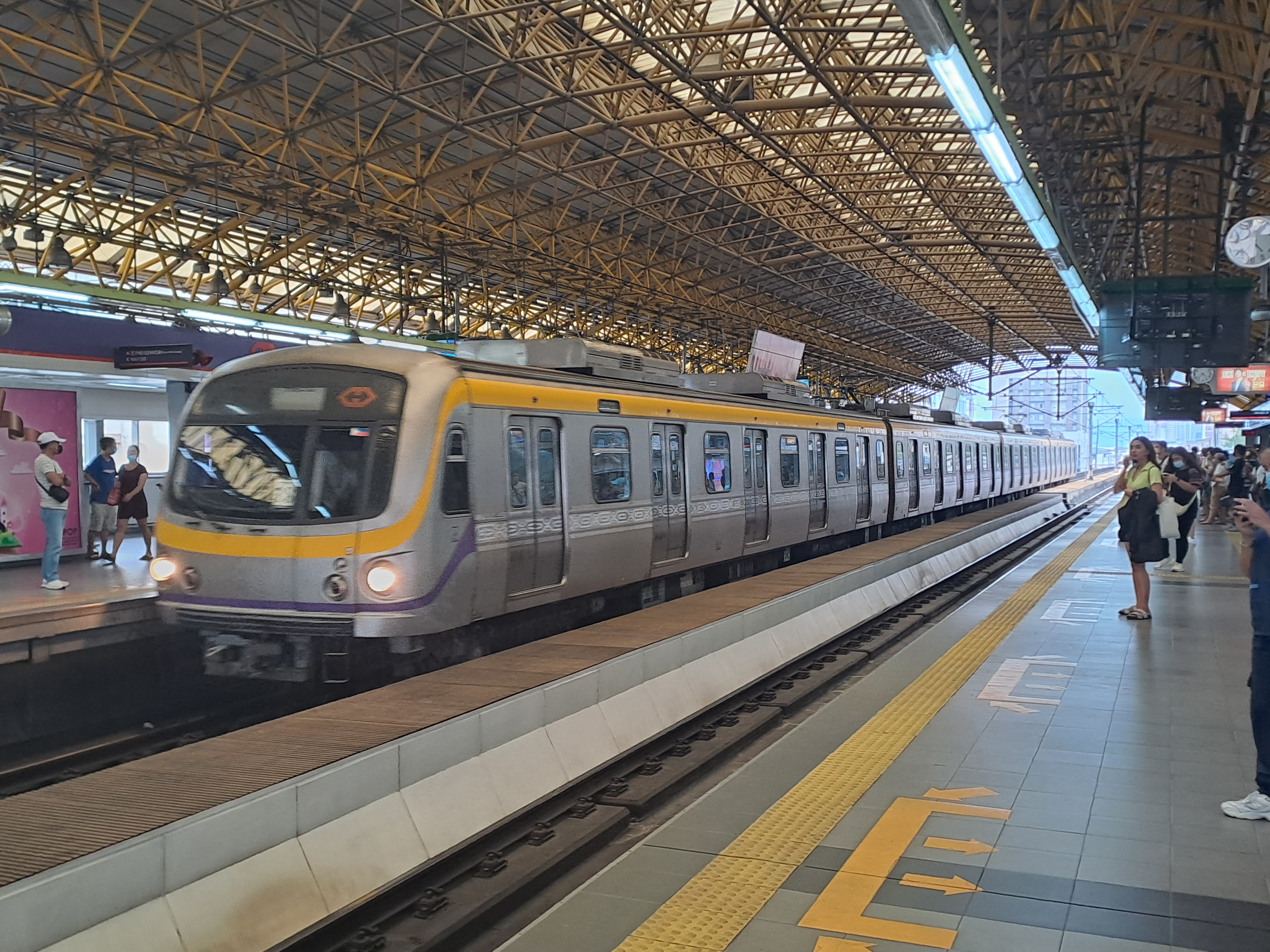
- A Line 2 train at Araneta Center–Cubao station

Overview
- Owner: Light Rail Transit Authority
- Locale: Metro Manila, Philippines
- Transit type: Rapid transit/Light metro
- Number of lines: 2 (operational); 1 (planned)
- Number of stations: 38 (present); 8 (planned)
- Daily ridership: 603,000 (2025)
- Annual ridership: 217.59 million (2025)
- Website: Light Rail Transit Authority; Light Rail Manila Corporation

Operation
- Began operation: December 1, 1984; 41 years ago
- Operators: Line 1: Light Rail Manila Corporation; Line 2: Light Rail Transit Authority
- Character: Grade separated (Note: While the rest of the system is mostly elevated, Line 2 has an underground section between Anonas and Santolan.)
- Rolling stock: Light rail vehicles (Line 1); Electric multiple units (Line 2)
- Number of vehicles: 331 vehicles (88 sets)
- Train length: 3–4 cars
- Headway: 8 minutes (average)

Technical
- System length: 43.5 km (27.0 mi)
- No. of tracks: Double-track
- Track gauge: 1,435 mm (4 ft 8 1/2 in) standard gauge
- Minimum radius of curvature: 100–175 m (328–574 ft) (mainline); 25–100 m (82–328 ft) (depot)
- Electrification: Overhead lines
- Average speed: 60 km/h (37 mph)
- Top speed: 80 km/h (50 mph)

The Manila Light Rail Transit System, commonly known as the LRT, is an urban rail transit system that primarily serves Metro Manila, Philippines. Although categorized as a light rail system because it originally used light rail vehicles, it presently has characteristics of a rapid transit system, such as high passenger throughput, exclusive right-of-way, and later use of full metro rolling stock. The LRT is jointly-operated by the Light Rail Transit Authority (LRTA), a government corporation attached to the Department of Transportation (DOTr), and the Light Rail Manila Corporation (LRMC). Along with the Manila Metro Rail Transit System and the Metro Commuter Line of the Philippine National Railways, the system makes up Metro Manila's rail infrastructure.

The LRT's 43.5-kilometer-route (27.0 mi) is mostly elevated and consists of two lines and 38 stations. Line 1, also called the Green Line (formerly known as the Yellow Line), opened in 1984 and travels a north–south route. Line 2, the Purple Line (briefly referred to as the Blue Line), was completed in 2004 and runs east–west. The original Line 1 was built as a no-frills means of public transport and lacks some features and comforts, but the newer Line 2 was built with additional standards and criteria in mind such as barrier-free access. In 2024, the system served 470,000 passengers on average. Security guards at each station conduct inspections and provide assistance. A reusable plastic magnetic ticketing system has replaced the previous token-based system in 2001, and the Flash Pass was introduced as a step towards a more integrated transportation system. In 2015, the plastic magnetic tickets were replaced with the Beep, a contactless smart card, introduced to provide a common ticketing to 3 rail lines and some bus lines.

Many passengers who ride the system also take various forms of road-based public transport, such as buses and jeepneys, to and from a station to reach their intended destination. Although it aims to reduce traffic congestion and travel times in the metropolis, the transportation system has only been partially successful due to the rising number of motor vehicles and rapid urbanization. The network's expansion is set on resolving this problem.

== Network ==
The network consists of two lines: the original Line 1 or Green Line, and the more modern Line 2, or Purple Line. Line 1 is aligned in a general north–south direction along over 25.9 kilometers (16.1 mi) of fully elevated track. From Monumento, it runs south above Rizal and Taft Avenue along grade-separated concrete viaducts allowing exclusive right-of-way before ending in Dr. Santos. A three-station east–west extension along Epifanio de los Santos Avenue that will connect Monumento to the North Avenue station was opened in 2010, although the common station is still under construction. Including the extension's two recently opened stations, Balintawak and Roosevelt, Line 1 has twenty stations. Line 2 consists of thirteen stations in a general east–west direction over 17.6 kilometers (10.9 mi) of mostly elevated track, with one station lying underground (Katipunan). Commencing in Recto, the line follows a corridor defined by Claro M. Recto and Legarda Avenues, Ramon Magsaysay and Aurora Boulevard, and the Marikina-Infanta Highway before reaching the other end of the line at Antipolo. The system passes through the cities of Caloocan, Manila, Marikina, Pasay, Pasig, Quezon City, and San Juan.

During peak hours, Line 1 fields 30 trains at most; the time interval between the departure of one and the arrival of another, called headway, is a minimum of 3–4 minutes. On January 9, 2009, Line 1 fielded 31 trains with a headway of 2 minutes to service devotees in celebration of the Feast of the Black Nazarene. Line 2 on the other hand, runs 10 trains at most with a minimum headway of 5 minutes. With the proper upgrades, Line 1 is designed to potentially run with headway as low as 1.5 minutes. Line 2 can run with headway as low as 2 minutes with throughput of up to 60,000 passengers per hour per direction (pphpd).

In conjunction with the Line 3—also known as the new Yellow Line, a similar but separate metro rail system formerly owned by the private Metro Rail Transit Corporation (MRTC) until 2025—the system provides the platform for the vast majority of rail travel in the Metro Manila area. Together with the PNR, the three constitute the SRTS. Recto and Doroteo Jose serve as the sole interchange between both lines of the LRTA. Araneta Center-Cubao and EDSA stations serve as interchanges between the LRT and the MRT networks. To transfer lines, passengers will need to exit from the station they are in then pass through covered walkways connecting the stations. Blumentritt station meanwhile is immediately above its PNR counterpart.

Dr. Santos, Central Terminal, and Fernando Poe Jr. are Line 1's three terminal stations; Recto, Araneta Center-Cubao, and Antipolo are the terminal stations on Line 2. All of them are located on or near major transport routes where passengers can take other forms of transportation such as privately run buses and jeepneys to reach their destination both within Metro Manila and in neighboring provinces. The system has two depots: Line 1 uses the Pasay Depot at LRTA headquarters in Pasay, near Baclaran station, while the Line 2 uses the Santolan Depot built by Sumitomo in Pasig.

Both lines are open every day of the year from 4:30 am PST (UTC+8) until 10:15 pm on weekdays, and from 5:00 am until 9:50 pm on weekends, except when changes have been announced. During Holy Week, a public holiday in the Philippines, the rail system is closed for annual maintenance, owing to fewer commuters and traffic around the metro, with normal operations resuming after Easter Sunday. During the Christmas season, operating hours are usually extended on the days leading up to Christmas Day, but are shortened on Christmas Eve and New Year's Eve to allow its staff to celebrate the holidays with their families. Notice of special schedules is given through press releases, via the public address system in every station, and on the LRTA and LRMC websites.

Name and color	Opened	Last extension	Stations	Length	Termini	
Line 1	December 1, 1984	November 16, 2024	25	25.9 km (16.1 mi)	Fernando Poe Jr.	Dr. Santos
Line 2	April 5, 2003	July 5, 2021	13	17.6 km (10.9 mi)	Recto	Antipolo
Lines and stations in italics are either under construction, not yet operational, or have been closed.

== History ==
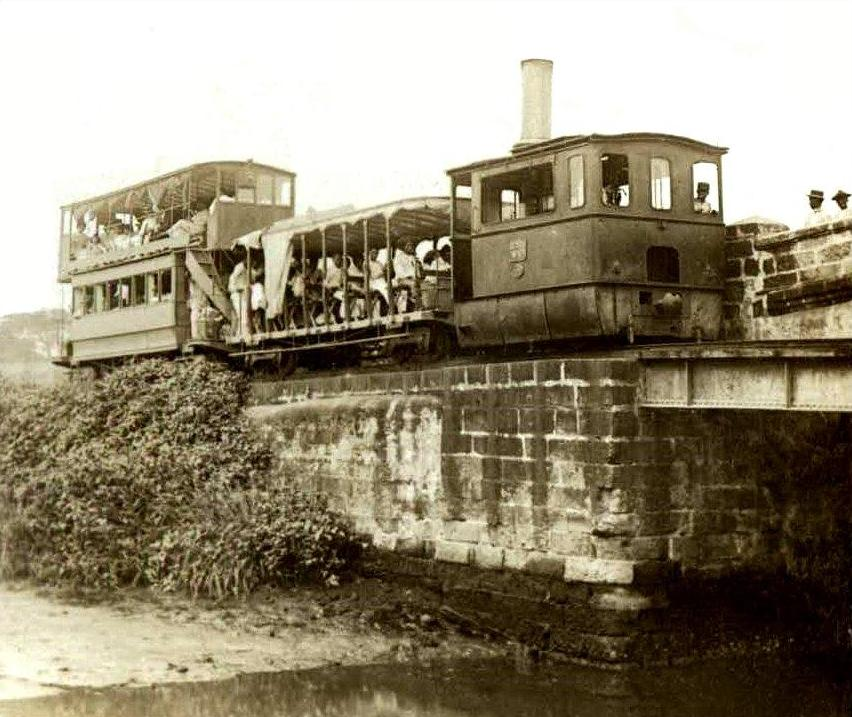
Steam-powered tranvia that served Malabon and Tondo from 1888 to 1898.

=== Early train system (1878–1945) ===
The system's roots date back to 1878 when an official from Spain's Department of Public Works for the Philippines submitted a proposal for a Manila streetcar system. The system proposed was a five-line network emanating from Plaza San Gabriel in Binondo, running to Intramuros, Malate, Malacañan Palace, Sampaloc and Tondo. The project was approved, and in 1882, Spanish-German businessman Jacobo Zóbel de Zangroniz, Spanish engineer Luciano M. Bremon, and Spanish banker Adolfo Bayo founded the Compañia de los Tranvias de Filipinas to operate the concession granted by the Spanish colonial government. The Malacañan Palace line was later replaced with a line linking Manila to Malabon, and construction began in 1885. Four German-made steam-operated locomotives and eight coaches for nine passengers each, composed the initial assets of the company. The Manila-Malabon line was the first line of the new system to be finished, opening to the public on October 20, 1888, with the rest of the network opening in 1889. From the beginning it proved to be a very popular line, with services originating from Tondo as early as 5:30 a.m. and ending at 7:30 p.m., while trips from Malabon were from 6:00 a.m. until 8:00 p.m., every hour on the hour in the mornings, and every half-hour beginning at 1:30 p.m.

With the American takeover of the Philippines, the Philippine Commission allowed the Manila Electric Railroad and Light Company (Meralco) to take over the properties of the Compañia de los Tranvias de Filipinas, with the first of twelve mandated electric tranvia (tram) lines operated by MERALCO opening in Manila in 1905. At the end of the first year around 63 kilometers (39 mi) of track had been laid. A five-year reconstruction program was initiated in 1920, and by 1924, 170 cars serviced many parts of the city and its outskirts. Although it was an efficient system for the city's 220,000 inhabitants, by the 1930s the streetcar network had stopped expanding.

A tranvia from the 1910s

=== Post-war (1945–1977) ===
The system was closed during World War II. By the war's end, the tram network was damaged beyond repair amid a city that lay in ruins. It was dismantled and jeepneys became the city's primary form of transportation, plying the routes once served by the tram lines. With the return of buses and cars to the streets, traffic congestion became a problem.

In 1966, the Philippine government granted a franchise to Philippine Monorail Transport Systems (PMTS) for the operation of an inner-city monorail. The monorail's feasibility was still being evaluated when the government asked the Japan International Cooperation Agency (JICA) to conduct a separate transport study. Prepared between 1971 and 1973, the JICA study proposed a series of circumferential and radial roads, an inner-city rapid transit system, a commuter railway, and an expressway with three branches. After further examination, many recommendations were adopted; however, none of them involved rapid transit and the monorail was never built. PMTS' franchise subsequently expired in 1974.

Another study was performed between 1976 and 1977, this time by Freeman Fox and Associates and funded by the World Bank. It originally suggested a street-level railway, but its recommendations were revised by the newly formed Ministry of Transportation and Communications (now the DOTr). The ministry instead called for an elevated system because of the city's many intersections. However, the revisions increased the price of the project from ₱1.5 billion to ₱2 billion. A supplementary study was conducted and completed within three months.

=== Advent of Line 1 (1977–2003) ===
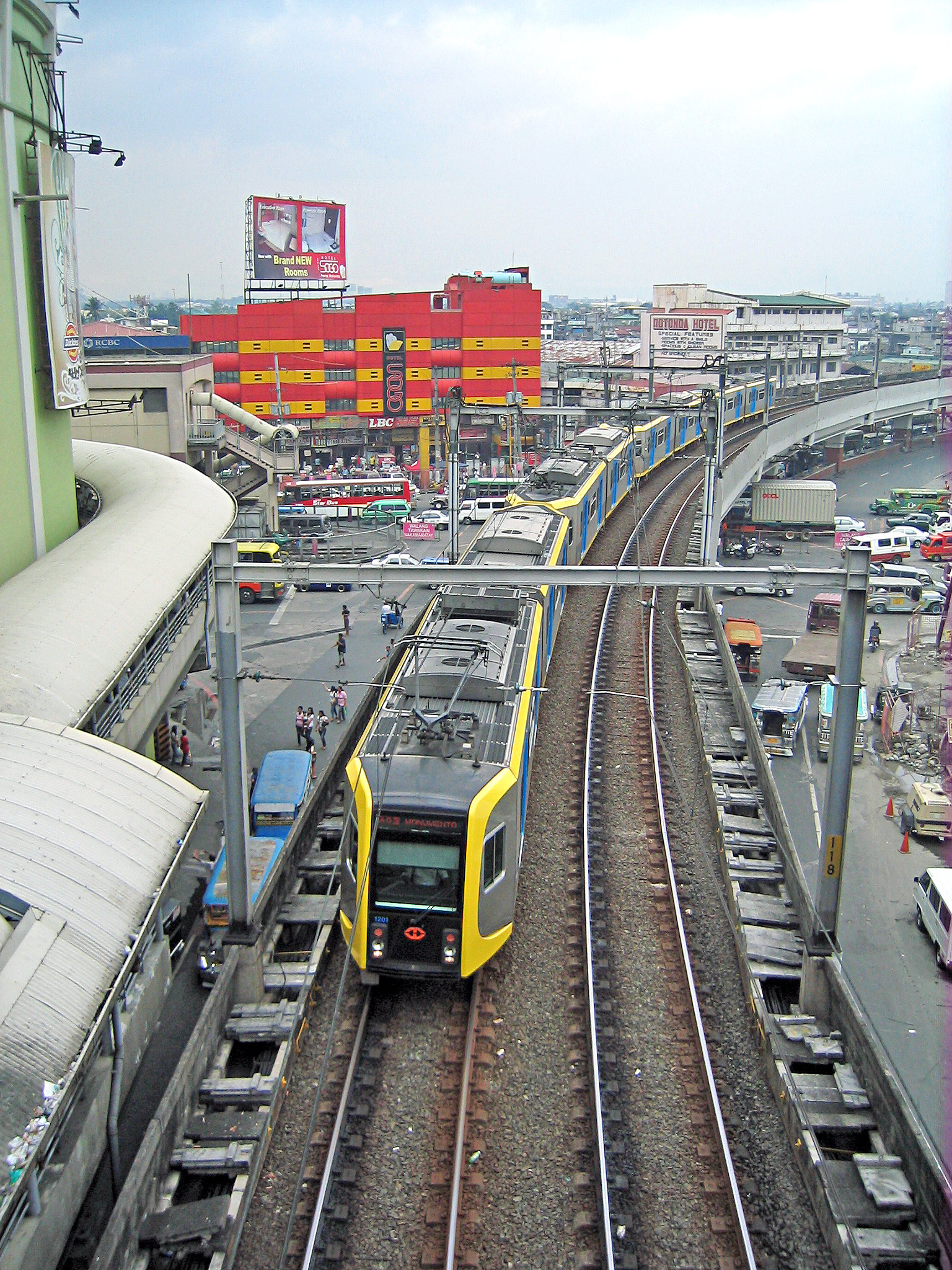
A Line 1 train approaching EDSA station

President Ferdinand Marcos created the Light Rail Transit Authority (LRTA) on July 12, 1980, by virtue of Executive Order No. 603, giving birth to what was then dubbed the "Metrorail". First Lady Imelda Marcos, then governor of Metro Manila and minister of human settlements, became its first chairman. Although responsible for the operations of the system, the LRTA primarily confined itself to setting and regulating fares, planning extensions and determining rules and policies, leaving the day-to-day operations to a sister company of Meralco called the Meralco Transit Organization (METRO Inc.). Initial assistance for the project came in the form of a ₱300 million soft loan from the Belgian government, with an additional ₱700 million coming from a consortium of companies comprising SA Ateliers de Constructions Electriques de Charleroi (ACEC) and BN Constructions Ferroviaires et Métalliques (today both part of Bombardier Transportation and now Alstom), Tractionnel Engineering International (TEI), and Transurb Consult (TC). Although expected to pay for itself from revenues within twenty years of the start of operation, it was initially estimated that the system would lose money until at least 1993. For the first year of operation, despite a projected ₱365 million in gross revenue, losses of ₱216 million were thought likely.

Construction of Line 1 started in September 1981 with the Construction and Development Corporation of the Philippines (now the Philippine National Construction Corporation) as the contractor with assistance from Losinger & Cie, a Swiss firm (today Losinger Marazzi), and the Philippine subsidiary of the U.S.-based Dravo Corporation. The government appointed Electrowatt Engineering Services of Zürich to oversee construction and eventually became responsible for the extension studies of future expansion projects. The Electrowatt plan—which is still used for planning future metro lines—consisted of a 150-kilometer (93-mile) network of rapid transit lines spanning all major corridors within 20 years, including a line on the Radial Road 6 alignment, one of the region's busiest road corridor.

The 1982 study of the system's network recommends lines that are proposed:

1. A first line will connect Baclaran and Monumento, although it is then still under construction.
2. A second line would connect Recto to Aurora Boulevard.
3. More lines that would run along EDSA, Quezon Boulevard, Quezon Avenue, Santa Mesa, Shaw Boulevard, and Gil Puyat Avenue.

The line was test-run in March 1984, and the first half of Line 1, from Baclaran to Arroceros (now Central Terminal), was opened on December 1, 1984. Carriedo station was later opened on April 14, 1985. The second half, from Doroteo Jose to Monumento, was opened on May 12, 1985. Overcrowding and poor maintenance took its toll a few years after opening. In 1990, due to premature wear and tear of Line 1, trains headed to Central Terminal station had to slow to a crawl to avoid further damage to the support beams below as cracks reportedly began to appear. The premature aging of Line 1 led to an extensive refurbishing and structural capacity expansion program with the help of Japan's ODA.

For the next few years, Line 1 operations ran smoothly. In 2000, however, employees of METRO Inc. went on strike, paralyzing Line 1 operations from July 25 to August 2, 2000. Consequently, the LRTA did not renew its operating contract with METRO Inc. that expired on July 31, 2000, and assumed all operational responsibility. At around 12:15 pm on December 30, 2000, a bomb—later learned to have been planted by Islamic terrorists—went off in the front coach of a Line 1 train pulling into Blumentritt station, killing 11 and injuring over 60 people in the most devastating of a series of attacks that day, now known as the Rizal Day bombings.

=== The Line 2 project (2003–2021) ===
With Japan's ODA amounting to 75 billion yen in total, the construction of Line 2 began in the 1990s. In 2001, the Legarda portion of the project was briefly the site of the May 1 riots against the Philippine government, with one of the project's backhoe loaders being set on fire by protesters. The first section of the line, from Santolan to Araneta Center-Cubao, was opened on April 5, 2003. The second section, from Araneta Center-Cubao to Legarda, was opened exactly a year later, with the entire line being fully operational by October 29, 2004 During that time the Line 1 was modernized. Automated fare collection systems using magnetic stripe plastic tickets were installed; air-conditioned trains added; pedestrian walkways between Lines 1, 2, and 3 were completed. In 2005, the LRTA made a profit of ₱68 million, the first time the agency made a profit since the Line 1 became operational in 1984.

A two-station, 3.8-kilometer (2.4 mi) extension of Line 2 eastward from Marikina up to Masinag, Antipolo in the province of Rizal opened to the public on July 5, 2021, six years after construction began in 2015.

=== Line 1 concession and extension (2015–present) ===
First proposed by SNC-Lavalin, the south extension of Line 1 has 8 stations over 11.7 kilometers (7 mi) ending in Bacoor in the province of Cavite. After Lavalin's bid was rejected by the Philippine government in 2005, the government worked with advisers (International Finance Corporation, White & Case, Halcrow, and others) to conduct an open-market invitation to tender for the construction of the extension and a 30-year concession to run it. An additional extension from Bacoor to Imus and a further extension to Dasmariñas, both in Cavite, are also being considered.

On March 22, 2012, the ₱60 billion Line 1 south extension project was approved by the National Economic and Development Authority (NEDA). In line with this, in October 2014, the operations and maintenance of Line 1 was awarded to the Light Rail Manila Corporation (LRMC), a joint venture company of Metro Pacific's Metro Pacific Light Rail Corporation (MPLRC), Ayala Corporation's AC Infrastructure Holdings Corporation (AC Infra), and the Philippine Investment Alliance for Infrastructure's Macquarie Infrastructure Holdings (Philippines) PTE Ltd. (MIHPL). The 32-year concession agreement took effect on September 12, 2015.

The groundbreaking ceremony of the south extension took place on May 4, 2017, with construction beginning in 2019. The first five stations (from Redemptorist station to Dr. Santos station) opened on November 16, 2024, while the second and third phases (from Zapote until Niog, hampered by right-of-way issues, will start operations in 2031.

== Infrastructure ==
=== Stations ===
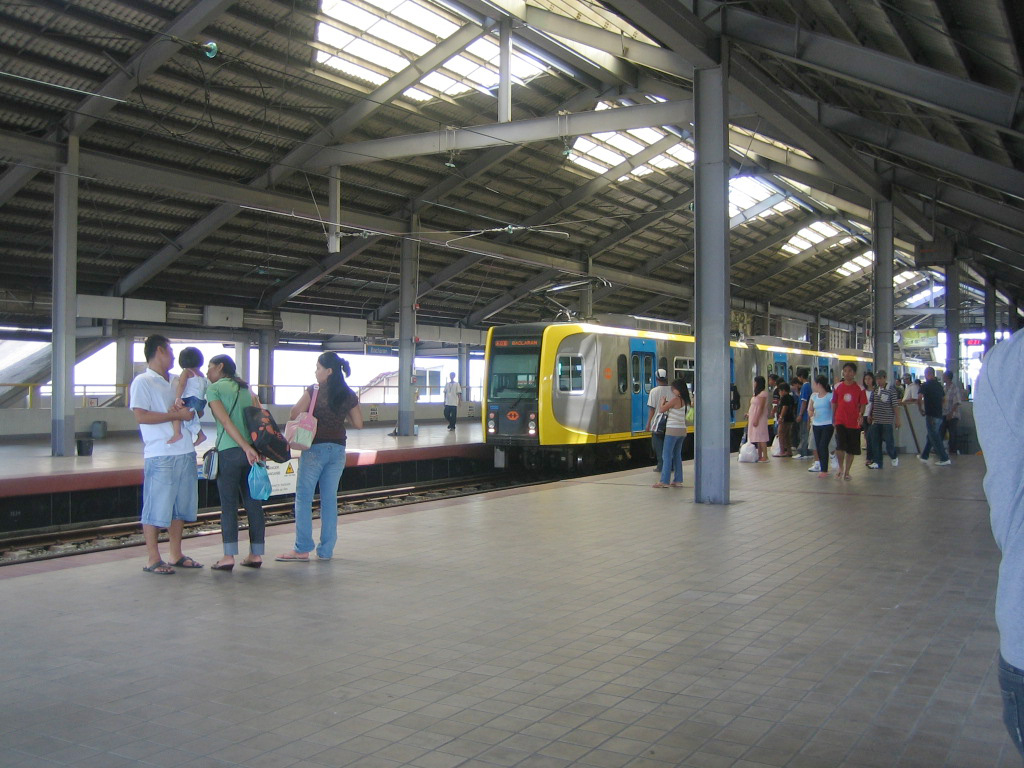
The concourse and platform areas of most Line 1 stations are both located on the same level.

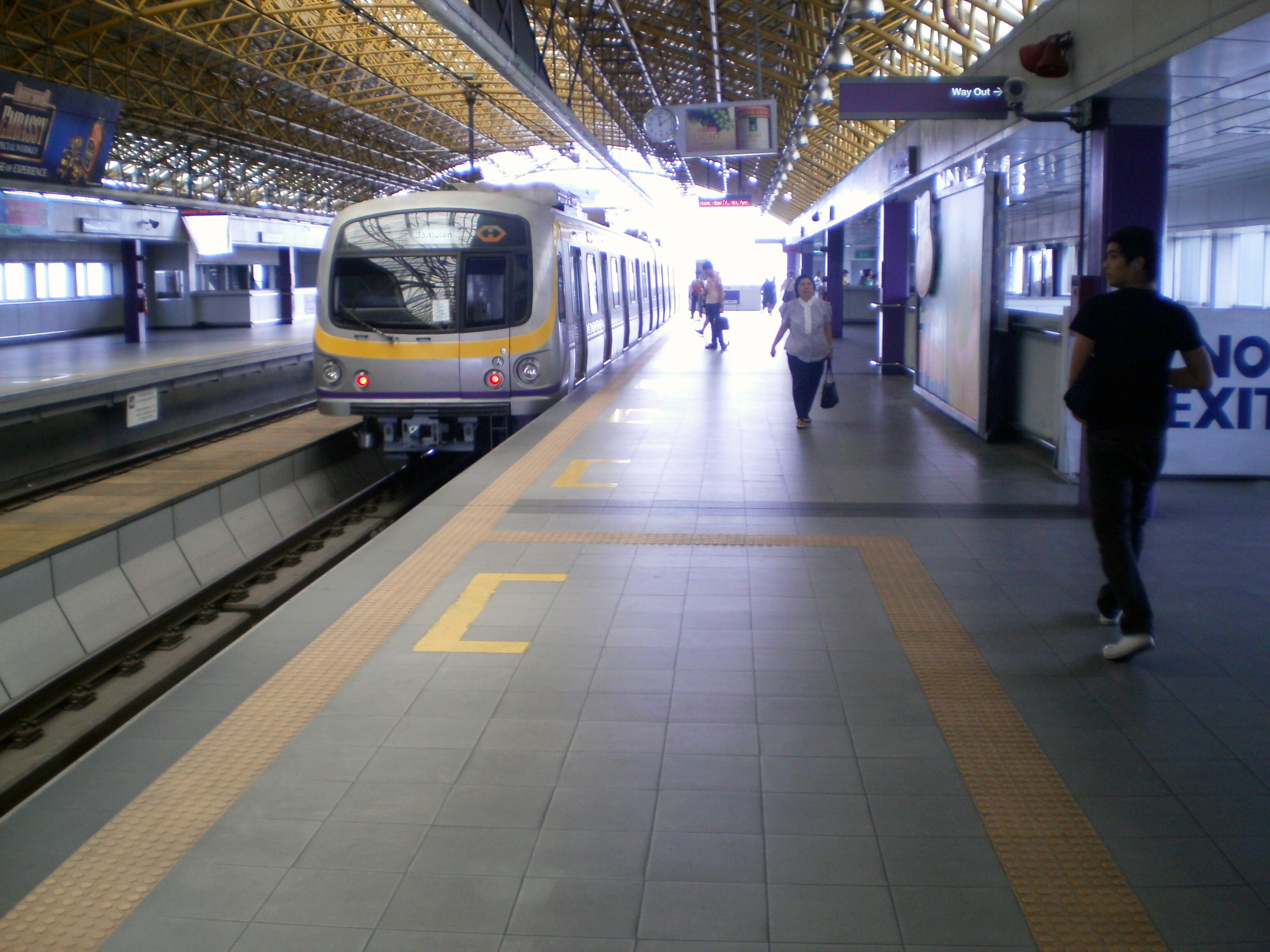
The concourse and platform areas of Line 2 stations are located on different levels.

With the exception of Katipunan (which is underground), the LRTA's 38 stations are elevated. They follow one of two different layouts. Most Line 1 stations are composed of only one level, accessible from the street below by stairway, containing the station's concourse and platform areas separated by fare gates. The boarding platforms are 100 meters (328 ft 1 in) long and 3.5 meters (11 ft 6 in) wide. Baclaran, Central Terminal, Carriedo, Balintawak, Fernando Poe Jr. and North Avenue stations on the Line 1, and all Line 2 stations are composed of two levels: a lower concourse level and an upper platform level (reversed in the case of Katipunan). Fare gates separate the concourse level from the stairs and escalators that provide access to the platform level. All stations have side platforms except for Baclaran, which has one side and one island platform, and Santolan, which has an island platform.

The concourse area at LRTA stations typically contains a passenger assistance office (PAO), ticket purchasing areas (ticket counters and/or ticket machines), and at least one stall that sells food and drinks. Terminal stations also have a public relations office. Stores and ATMs are usually found at street level outside the station, although there are instances where they can be found within the concourse. Some stations, such as Monumento, Libertad and Araneta Center-Cubao, are directly connected to shopping malls.

All stations on both lines have public restrooms. According to LRTA data, Line 1 has 65 restrooms while Line 2 has 57 restrooms. In older Line 1 stations, most restrooms are single-occupancy facilities located within the paid areas, while newer stations have segregated restrooms in both concourse and paid areas. All restrooms on Line 2 are segregated and in the concourse area. In 2007, a column in the Philippine Daily Inquirer criticized the single-occupancy restrooms on Line 1 as insufficient for passenger demand and described them as poorly maintained and unsanitary.

Folding bicycles are allowed to be brought inside the trains to promote bimodal transportation. The LRTA has also designated the last car of each train as "green zones", where folding bicycle users can ride with their bikes, provided that it does not exceed the LRTA's baggage size limitations of 2 by 2 feet (20 by 20 in).

Originally, Line 1 was not built with accessibility in mind. This is reflected in the Line 1's lack of barrier-free facilities such as escalators and elevators. It is also inconvenient in other ways: for one, because of the use of side platforms, passengers wishing to access the other platform for the train bound in the opposite direction at single-level Line 1 stations need to exit the station (and by extension, the system) and pay a new fare. The newer Line 2, unlike its counterpart, is designed to be barrier-free and allows seamless transfer between platforms. Built by a joint venture between Hanjin and Itochu, Line 2 stations have wheelchair ramps, braille markings, and tactile paving leading to and from the boarding platforms in addition to escalators and elevators.

In cooperation with the Philippine Daily Inquirer, copies of the Inquirer Libre—a free, tabloid-size, Tagalog version of the Inquirer broadsheet—are available at selected LRTA stations from 6:00 am until the supply runs out.

=== Rolling stock ===
Five types of rolling stock run on the system, with four types used on Line 1 and another used on Line 2. The Line 2, unlike the Line 1, runs heavy rail metro cars made in South Korea by Hyundai Rotem and provided by the Asia-Europe MRT Consortium led by Marubeni Corporation that have higher passenger capacity and maximum speed. All five types of rolling stock are powered by electricity supplied through overhead wires. Of the two LRTA lines, the Line 2 prominently employs wrap advertising in its rolling stock. The Line 1 have begun using wrap advertising as well initially for their second-generation trains, followed by their third and fourth-generation trains.

==== Line 1 ====
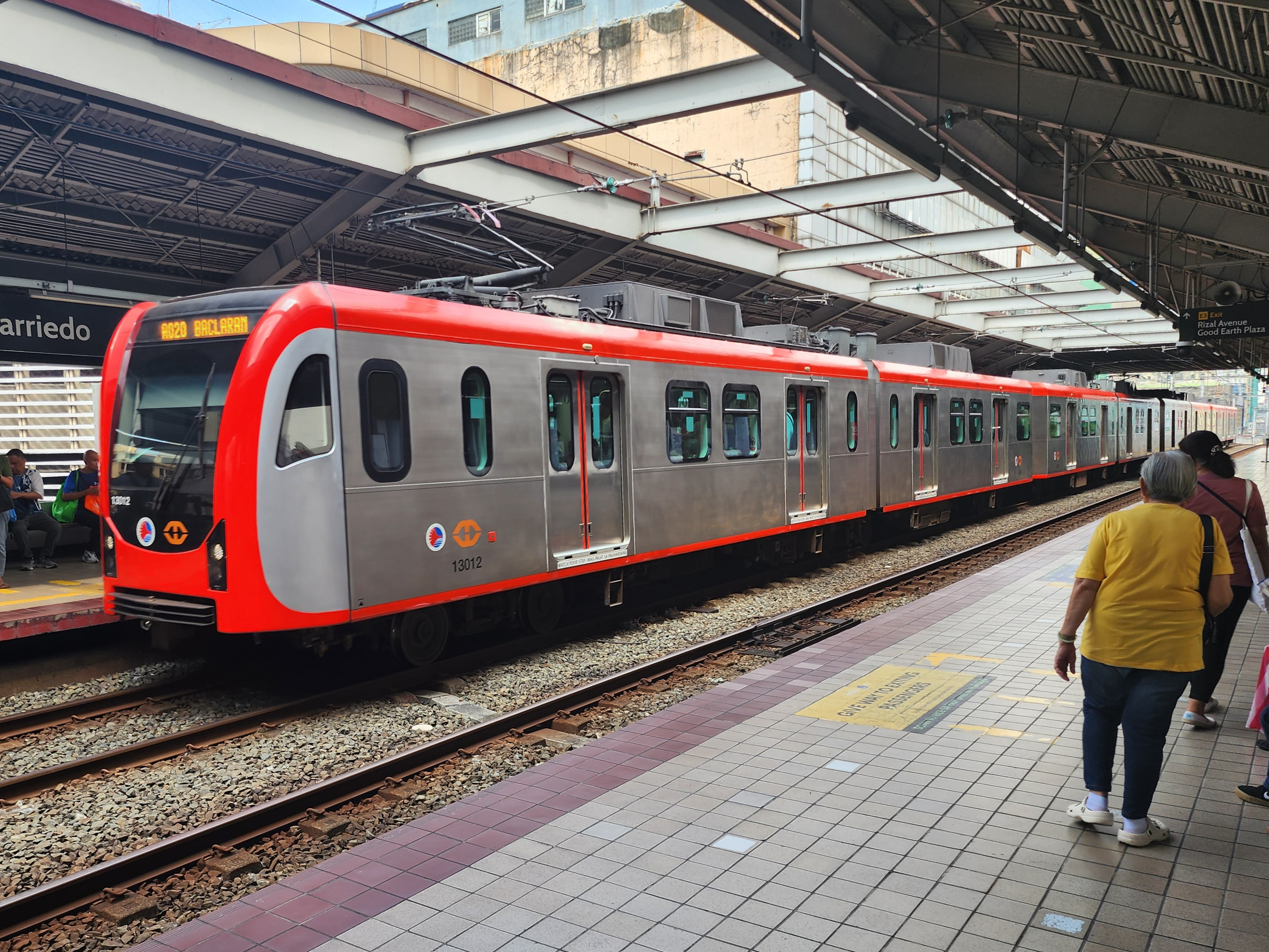
The newest trains of Line 1, now in predominant use, entered service in 2023.

Line 1 at various stages in its history has used two-car, three-car, and four-car trains. The two-car trains are the original first-generation BN (1000) trains. Most were transformed into three-car trains, although a lot of two-car trains remain in service. The four-car trains are the more modern second-generation Hyundai Precision and Adtranz (1100), the third-generation Kinki Sharyo / Nippon Sharyo (1200), and the fourth-generation Mitsubishi / Construcciones y Auxiliar de Ferrocarriles (13000) trains. There are 259 railway cars grouped into 70 trains serving the line: 63 of these are first-generation cars, 28 second-generation, 48 third-generation, and 120 fourth-generation. One train car (1037) was severely damaged in the Rizal Day bombings and was subsequently decommissioned. The maximum speed of these cars ranges between 60 and 70 kilometers per hour (37 and 43 mph).

As part of the second phase of expansion on the Yellow Line, 12 trains made in Japan by Kinki Sharyo and Nippon Sharyo were shipped and entered revenue service in 2006. The air-conditioned trains have boosted the capacity of the line from 27,000 to 40,000 passengers per hour per direction.

As part of the south extension of the line, 30 new trains built in Spain and Mexico by Construcciones y Auxiliar de Ferrocarriles and Mitsubishi Corporation were procured in 2017. The trains entered service in 2023.

==== Line 2 ====
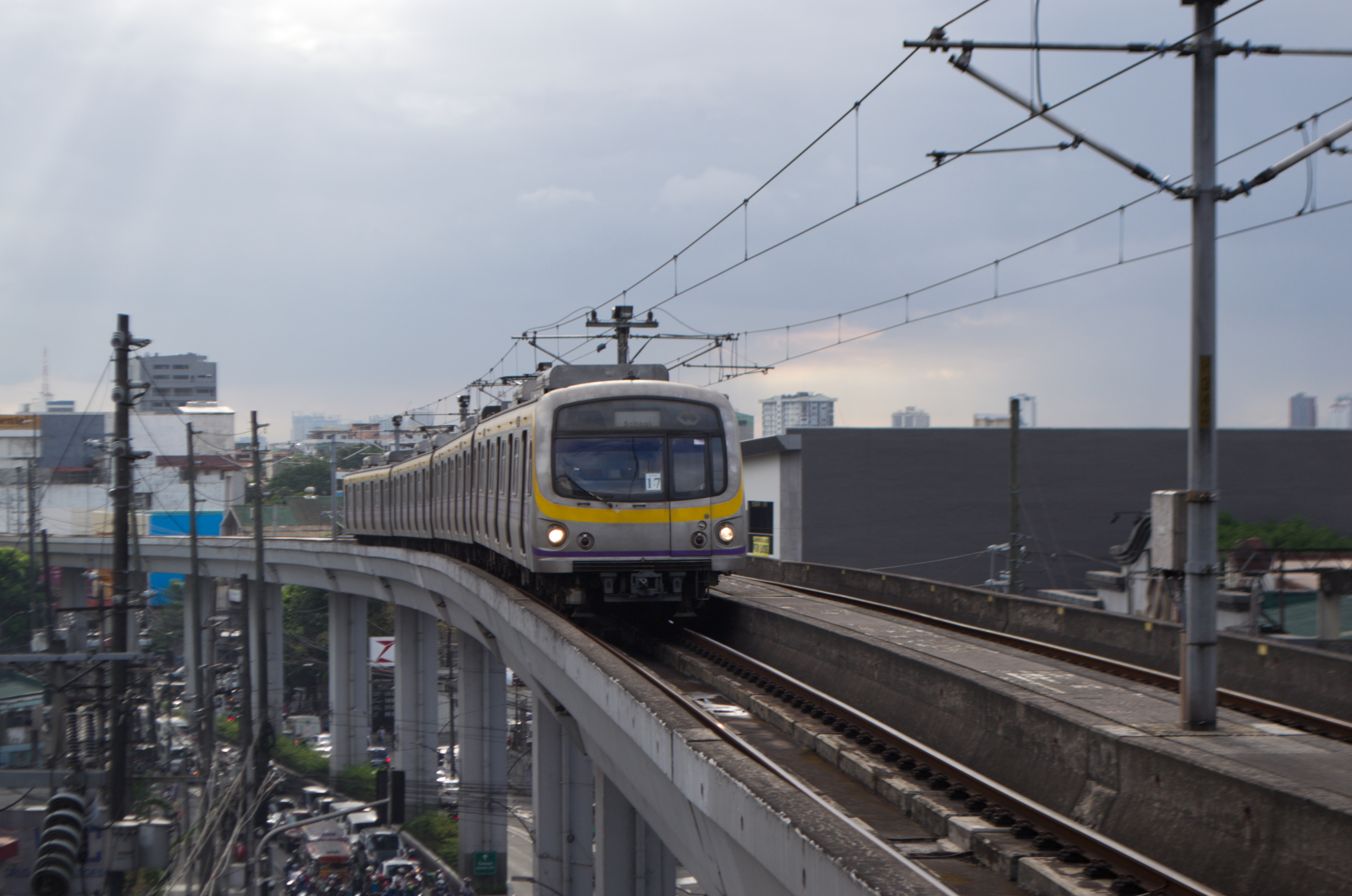
A train of the Line 2

The Line 2 fleet runs eighteen heavy rail four-car trains with lightweight stainless car bodies and alternating current traction motors. They have a top speed of 80 kilometers per hour (50 mph) and usually take around forty minutes to journey from one end of the line to the other. Each train measures 3.2 meters (10 ft 6 in) wide and 92.6 meters (303 ft 10 in) long allowing a capacity of 1,628 passengers: 232 seated and 1,396 standing. Twenty sliding doors per side facilitate quick entry and exit. The line's trains also feature air conditioning, driverless automatic train operation from the Operations Control Center (OCC) in Santolan, low-noise control, enabled electric and hydraulic braking, and closed-circuit television inside the trains. Special open spaces and seats are designated for wheelchair users and elderly passengers, and automatic next station announcements are made for the convenience of passengers, especially for the blind.

An additional fourteen four-car trains for the east extension and the future west extension are currently in the process of being procured.

=== Signalling ===
The system has used various signalling systems throughout its history. The original signalling system used in the LRT Line 1 was based on fixed block and relay type trackside systems. Trains had an automatic train stop system that activates if the train passes by a red signal or over-speeding. In 2007, as part of a capacity expansion project, the signalling system was replaced with a signalling and train control system based on automatic train protection and automatic train supervision using Siemens technology. In 2022, as part of the line's south extension, the existing signalling system used in Line 1 was replaced by the Atlas 100 solution of Alstom, which is based on ETCS Level 1.

On the other hand, Line 2 uses the automatic train control system, which has three subsystems: automatic train protection (ATP), automatic train operation (ATO), and automatic train supervision (ATS). The ATO subsystem automatically drives the trains, while the opening and closing of doors is controlled by an onboard train attendant. It is a track circuit-based system with equipment supplied by Westinghouse Signals (later Siemens Mobility).

Line	Supplier	Solution	Type	Commission Date	Remarks
Line 1	Alstom	Atlas 100	ETCS Level 1	2022	—N/a
Line 2	Westinghouse Signals (later Siemens)	TBS100	Fixed block ATC	2003	—N/a
Former
Line 1	ACEC	unknown	Fixed block	1984	Decommissioned by 2007
Line 1	Siemens	unknown	Fixed block	2007	Decommissioned by 2022

== Safety and security ==
The system has always presented itself as a safe system to travel on, and despite some incidents, a World Bank paper prepared by Halcrow deemed the running of metro rail transit operations overall as "good". Safety notices in both English and Tagalog are a common sight at the stations and inside the trains. Security guards with megaphones can be seen at boarding areas asking crowds to move back from the warning tiles at the edge of platforms to avoid falling onto the tracks. In the event of emergencies or unexpected events aboard the train, alerts are used to inform passengers about the current state of the operations. The LRTA uses three alerts: Codes Blue, Yellow, and Red.

Alert	Indication
Code Blue	Increased interval time between train arrivals
Code Yellow	Slight delay in the departure and arrival of trains from stations
Code Red	Temporary suspension of all train services due to technical problems

Smoking, previously banned only at station platforms and inside trains, has been banned at station concourse areas since June 24, 2008. Hazardous chemicals, such as paint and gasoline, as well as sharp pointed objects that could be used as weapons are forbidden. Full-sized bicycles and skateboards are also not allowed on board the train, however folding bicycles are allowed on both lines as of November 8, 2009. Those under the influence of alcohol may be denied entry into the stations.

In response to the Rizal Day bombings, a series of attacks on December 30, 2000, that included the bombing of a Line 1 train among other targets, and in the wake of greater awareness of terrorism following the September 11 attacks, security has been stepped up on board the system. The Philippine National Police has a special police force assigned to both lines, and security police provided by private companies are assigned to all stations, with each having a designated head guard. Closed-circuit televisions have been installed to monitor stations and keep track of suspicious activities. To better prepare for and improve response to any adverse incidents, drills simulating terror attacks and earthquakes have been conducted. It is standard practice for bags to be inspected upon entry into stations by guards equipped with hand-held metal detectors. Those who refuse to submit to such inspection may be denied entry. Since May 1, 2007, the LRTA has enforced a policy against making false bomb threats, a policy already enforced at airports nationwide. Those who make such threats can face penalties in violation of Presidential Decree No. 1727, as well as face legal action. Posted notices on station walls and inside trains remind passengers to be careful and be wary of criminals who may take advantage of the crowding aboard the trains. To address concerns of inappropriate contact on crowded trains, the first coach of Line 1 and Line 2 trains have been designated for PWDs and females only.

== Fares ==
Manila LRT fare levels
Line	Line 1	Line 2
Boarding fare	₱16.25	₱13.29
Distance fare (Note: Added to the boarding fare per kilometer traveled.)	₱1.47/km	₱1.21/km
Minimum	₱20.00	₱15.00
Maximum	₱55.00	₱35.00
Note: Fares are lower when a stored value card is used.

In 2003, the Manila Light Rail Transit System was one of the least expensive rapid transit systems in Southeast Asia, costing significantly less to ride than other systems in the region. Unlike other transportation systems, in which transfer to another line occurs within a station's paid area, passengers have to exit and then pay a new fare for the line they are entering. This is also the case on the Yellow Line when changing boarding platforms to catch trains going in the opposite direction.

Both lines use two different fare structures: one for single journey cards and another for stored value (Beep) cards. As mandated by law, senior citizens and persons with disabilities are entitled to a twenty-percent discount. Since June 20, 2025, students get a higher fare discount of fifty percent, followed by senior citizens and PWDs on July 16. The Trade Union Congress of the Philippines, meanwhile, called on the government to implement the same discount for workers whose salaries are under the minimum wage.

=== Ticketing ===
Before 2001, passengers on Line 1 would purchase a token to enter the station. Subsequent upgrades in the fare collection system eventually transitioned the Yellow Line from a token-based system to a ticket-based system, with full conversion to a ticket-based system achieved on September 9, 2001. Starting September 2015, the old magnetic tickets were decommissioned and replaced by contactless-based smart card technology by IDEMIA. Passengers can enter the system paid areas with either a single journey or stored value Beep Card. The Beep Card can be used on all LRT and MRT lines. Tickets can be sold from ticket booths staffed by station agents or from ticket machines.

==== Magnetic ticket ====
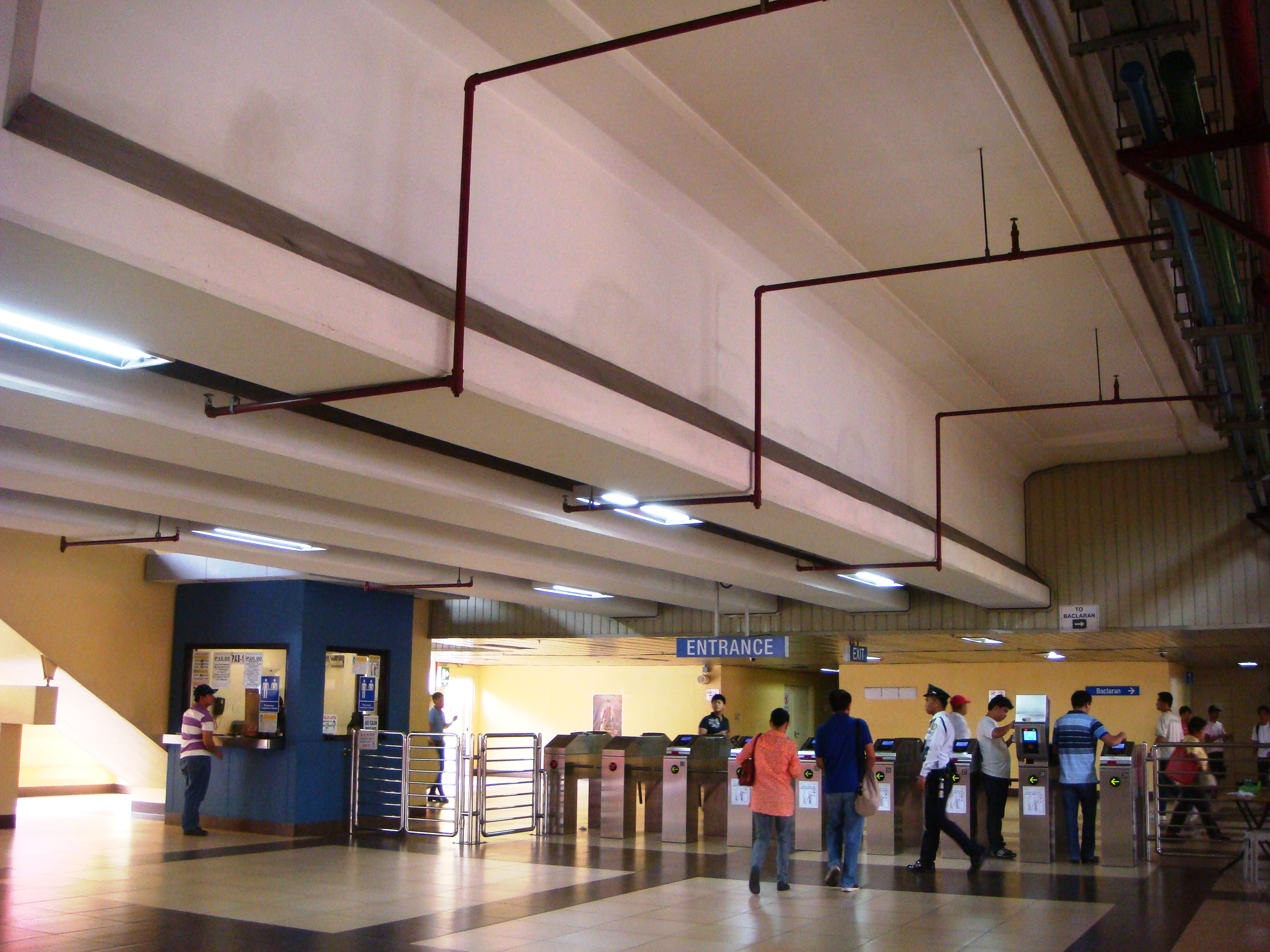
Roosevelt station in 2012, with the old turnstiles at the background when magnetic tickets were still used.

Previously, the system uses two types of tickets: a single journey (one-way) ticket whose cost is dependent on the destination, and a stored value (multiple-use) ticket available for ₱100. Tickets would normally bear a picture of the incumbent president, though some ticket designs have done away with this practice.

Single journey tickets are only valid on the day of purchase and will be unusable afterward. They expire if not used to exit the same station after 30 minutes from entry or if not used to exit the system after 120 minutes from entry. If the ticket expires, the passenger will be required to buy a new one.

Stored value tickets are usable on both lines although a new fare will be charged when transferring from one line to the other. To reduce ticket queues, the LRTA is promoting the use of stored value tickets. Aside from benefitting from a lower fare structure on the Line 1, stored value ticket users can avail a scheme called the Last Ride Bonus that grants the use of any residual amount in a stored value ticket less than the usual minimum ₱12 fare, or the appropriate fare for the station of arrival from the station of departure, as a full fare. Stored value tickets are not reloadable and are captured by the fare gate after the last use. They expire six months after the date of first use.

Tickets are used both to enter and exit the paid area of the system. A ticket inserted into a fare gate at the station of origin is processed and then ejected allowing a passenger through the turnstile. The ejected ticket is then retrieved while passing through so that it can be used at the exit turnstile at the destination station to leave the premises. Tickets are captured by the exit turnstiles to be reused by the system if they no longer have any value. If it is a stored value ticket with some value remaining, however, it is once again ejected by the fare gate to be taken by the passenger for future use.

Despite the common practice for regular passengers to purchase several stored-value tickets at a time, the line barely has ticket shortages due to the inter-compatibility of tickets with the LRTA lines and the steady release of new tickets that addresses the problem.

==== Flash Pass ====
A Flash Pass Card

To better integrate the LRTA and MRTC networks, a unified ticketing system utilizing contactless smart cards, similar to the Octopus card in Hong Kong and the EZ-Link card in Singapore, was made a goal of the SRTS. In a transitional move towards such a unified ticketing system, the Flash Pass was implemented on April 19, 2004, as a stopgap measure. However, plans for a unified ticketing system using smart cards have languished, leaving the Flash Pass to fill the role for the foreseeable future. Originally sold by both the LRTA and the Metro Rail Transit Corporation, the Blue Line operator, the pass was discontinued with the election of Benigno Aquino III as President of the Philippines in 2010.

The pass consisted of two parts: the Flash Pass card and the Flash Pass coupon. A nontransferable Flash Pass card used for validation had to be acquired before a Flash Pass coupon could be purchased. To obtain a card, a passenger needed to visit a designated station and fill out an application form. Although the card was issued free of charge and contained no expiry date, it was expected to be issued only once. Should it be lost, an affidavit of loss had to be submitted before a replacement could be issued. The Flash Pass coupon, which served as a ticket, was linked to the passenger's Flash Pass card through the card number printed on the coupon. Coupons were sold for ₱250 and were valid for unlimited rides on all three lines of the LRTA and MRTC for one week. The card and coupon were used by showing them to a security guard at an opening along the fare gates, who after checking their validity allowed the holder to pass through.

==== Beep card ====
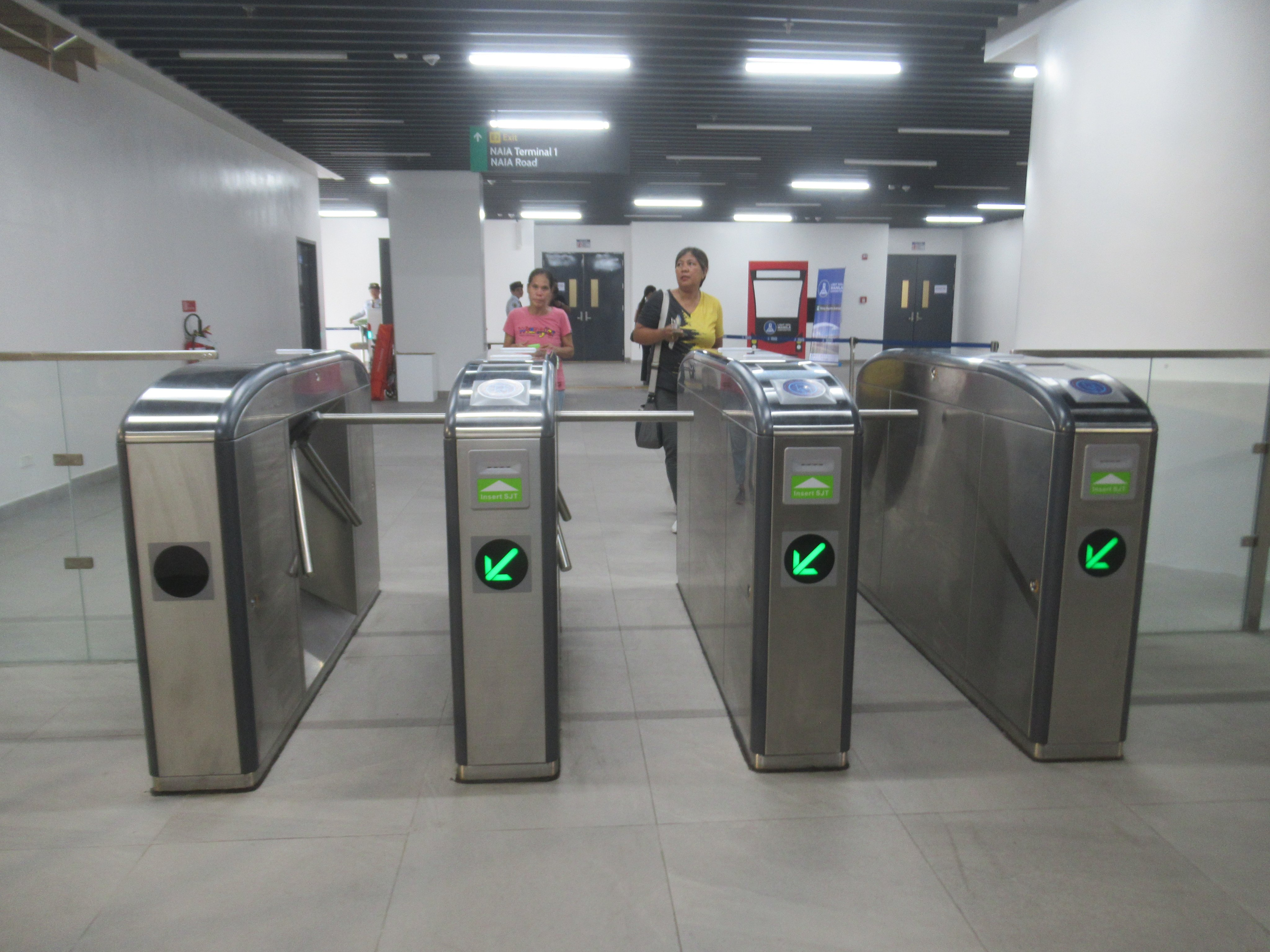
The current turnstiles used system-wide since 2015, at Ninoy Aquino station

Beep is a reloadable contactless smart card aimed to be a replacement for the magnetic card-based system in paying rail based rapid transit transportation fares in and around Metro Manila. Beep is also aimed to be used in lieu of cash in some convenience stores and other businesses. The Beep system is implemented and operated by AF Payments Incorporated, which is primarily owned by Ayala Corporation and Metro Pacific Investments Corporation. It was first implemented in Line 2 in July 2015, followed by Line 1 a month later.

==== QR codes ====
In November 2021, the Light Rail Manila Corporation and AF Payments, Inc. presented a QR code-based ticketing system purchased via mobile apps to be used in Line 1, serving as viable alternatives to single journey tickets. This ticket system was implemented in May 2023.

=== Fare adjustment ===
Adjusting passenger fares has been employed by the DOTC (predecessor of DOTr), LRTA, and LRMC as a means to improve the lines' services, and the issue of fares both historically and in the present continues to be a political issue.

Current fare levels for Line 2 were set on August 2, 2023, and for Line 1 on April 2, 2025. Proposals for such were delayed for several years despite inflation and rising operating costs. Prior to the current fare levels, fares for both lines were set on January 4, 2015. These lower fares—which are only slightly more expensive than jeepney fares—ended up being financed through large government subsidies amounting to around ₱25–45 per passenger, and which for both the MRT and LRT reached ₱75 billion for the 10-year period between 2004 and 2014. Without subsidies, the cost of a single trip is estimated at around ₱40–60, and a ₱10 increase in fares would yield additional monthly revenues of ₱2–3 billion a month.

Under the concession agreement of the DOTr and the Light Rail Manila Corporation (LRMC) for the operations and maintenance of the LRT Line 1, LRMC is entitled to petition a fare hike every two years. With all four petitions in 2016, 2018, 2020, and 2022 deferred, it resulted in losses of ₱2.17 billion as of November 2024, and would increase to ₱7 billion by 2028 if the hikes were not implemented. However, these drew criticism from commuters' and labor groups; Kilusang Mayo Uno (KMU) called the fare hike "immoral" amid high prices of basic necessities. However, LRMC's president and Chief Executive Officer Enrico Benipayo emphasized that:

Public transport is a service that requires continuous investments in maintenance, upgrades and expansion. Countries with world-class transport systems such as Singapore and Japan adjust fares regularly to keep services efficient and safe.

— Enrico R. Benipayo

== Expansion ==
Plans for expanding the LRTA network have been formulated throughout its history and successive administrations have touted trains as one of the keys to relieving Metro Manila of its long-standing traffic problems. Expansion of the system was one of the main projects mentioned in a ten-point agenda laid out by President Gloria Macapagal Arroyo in 2005.

=== Extensions ===
A one-station extension of Line 1 to North Triangle Common Station, allowing interchange with MRT Lines 3 and 7, has been under construction since 2017 but is not expected to be completed before 2027.

Line 2 is planned to be extended both further eastward to Cogeo, continuing from its eastern expansion to Antipolo, and westward from Recto up to the Manila North Harbor in Tondo.

=== New lines ===
The LRT Line 6 was originally conceived as a continuation of the LRT Line 1 to Dasmariñas, Cavite. In its current form, the "Modified" Line 6 proposal is a 23.5 km (14.6 mi) elevated railway from Niog station in Bacoor to Governor's Drive station in Dasmariñas via the Molino–Paliparan Road. The line will also be extended further north to Ninoy Aquino International Airport (as Line 6B) in Pasay and further south as Tagaytay (as Line 6A extension). There will also be branch lines passing through Dr. Santos Avenue and Alabang–Zapote Road in southern Metro Manila. The combined length of the proposed line including the extensions and branch lines is at 86 km (53 mi) and with a track length 169 km (105 mi).
