= Doroteo Jose station =

Train station in Manila, Philippines

Coordinates: 14°36′19.71″N 120°58′55.45″E

Doroteo Jose
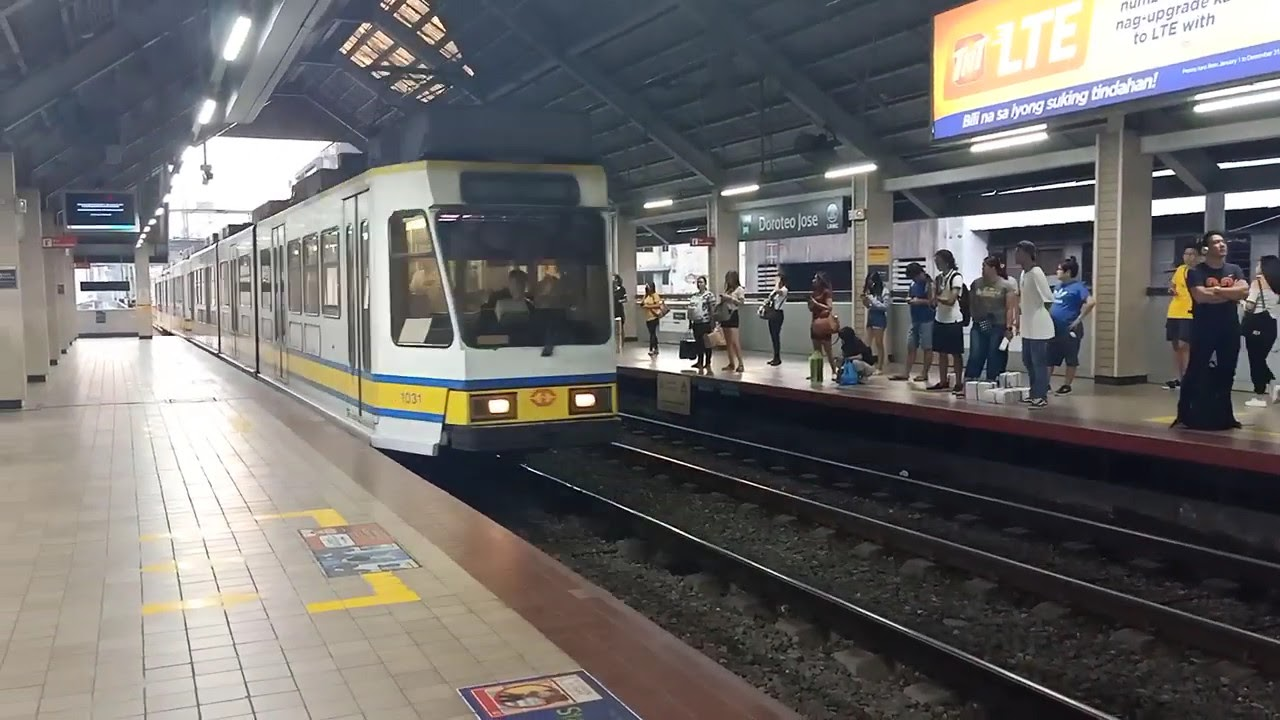

General information
- Location: Rizal Avenue, Santa Cruz; Manila, Metro Manila, Philippines
- Owner: Department of Transportation – Light Rail Transit Authority
- Operator: Light Rail Manila Corporation
- Line: LRT Line 1
- Platforms: 2 (2 side)
- Tracks: 2
- Connections: Recto

Construction
- Structure type: Elevated
- Parking: Yes (Manila Grand Opera Hotel & Casino, Amaia Skies Avenida)
- Accessible: Yes

Other information
- Station code: GL10

History
- Opened: May 12, 1985; 41 years ago

Services
Preceding station	Manila LRT	Following station
Bambang towards Fernando Poe Jr.	LRT Line 1	Carriedo towards Dr. Santos

Out-of-system interchange
Preceding station	Manila LRT	Following station
Legarda towards Antipolo	LRT Line 2 transfer at Recto	Terminus
Track layout
Location
- Location within Manila Location within Metro Manila Location within Luzon Location within Philippines

Doroteo Jose station is an elevated Light Rail Transit (LRT) station located on the LRT Line 1 (LRT-1) system in Santa Cruz, Manila. The station is situated on Rizal Avenue and slightly past Doroteo Jose Street. Both the station and the street are named after Doroteo Jose, a Filipino who was arrested by Spanish authorities in 1898 for leading a movement against a corrupt archbishop.

Doroteo Jose station is the second station of LRT-1 north of the Pasig River, after Carriedo station. It is the tenth station for trains headed to Dr. Santos and the sixteenth station for trains headed to Fernando Poe Jr.

The station is near the Manila City Jail and the Fabella Memorial Hospital. Popular shopping centers such as the Isetann Cinerama Recto and the Odeon Terminal Mall are also nearby. Due to its position of being near the University Belt, the station is also close to educational institutions of the University Belt. It is one of the only stations on the line where commuters can transfer from one platform to another without having to go down to the street level. However, unlike the stations of Baclaran, Central Terminal, Carriedo, Balintawak, and Fernando Poe Jr., commuters still have to exit the fare gates to access the walkway above the platforms.

== History ==
Doroteo Jose station was opened to the public on May 12, 1985, as part of the Rizal Line, which extended the LRT northward to Monumento.

The station's renovation program began in December 2016. The renovation improved and equipped the station with structural upgrades and new modern facilities. It was reopened in a ceremony on February 6, 2017.

== Transportation links ==
Doroteo Jose station serves as the transfer point between LRT Lines 1 and 2. The station is connected to Recto station by means of an elevated walkway.

The station, being near the University Belt of Manila, serves as an important transfer point for buses, taxis, and tricycles, although this role is also being given to the closer Recto station. Buses stop at the bus terminal on Recto Avenue.

Many provincial bus lines, such as Bataan Transit (Bataan, Pampanga, Pangasinan, and other Northern Luzon provinces), Genesis Transport Service Inc. (Bataan, Pampanga, and Baguio), Solid North Transit Inc. (Pangasinan and Tarlac), and Philippine Rabbit (Tarlac and Baguio) provide bus terminals near the station and serve the northern corridors.

== Gallery ==
Turnstiles at the concourse area into a platform

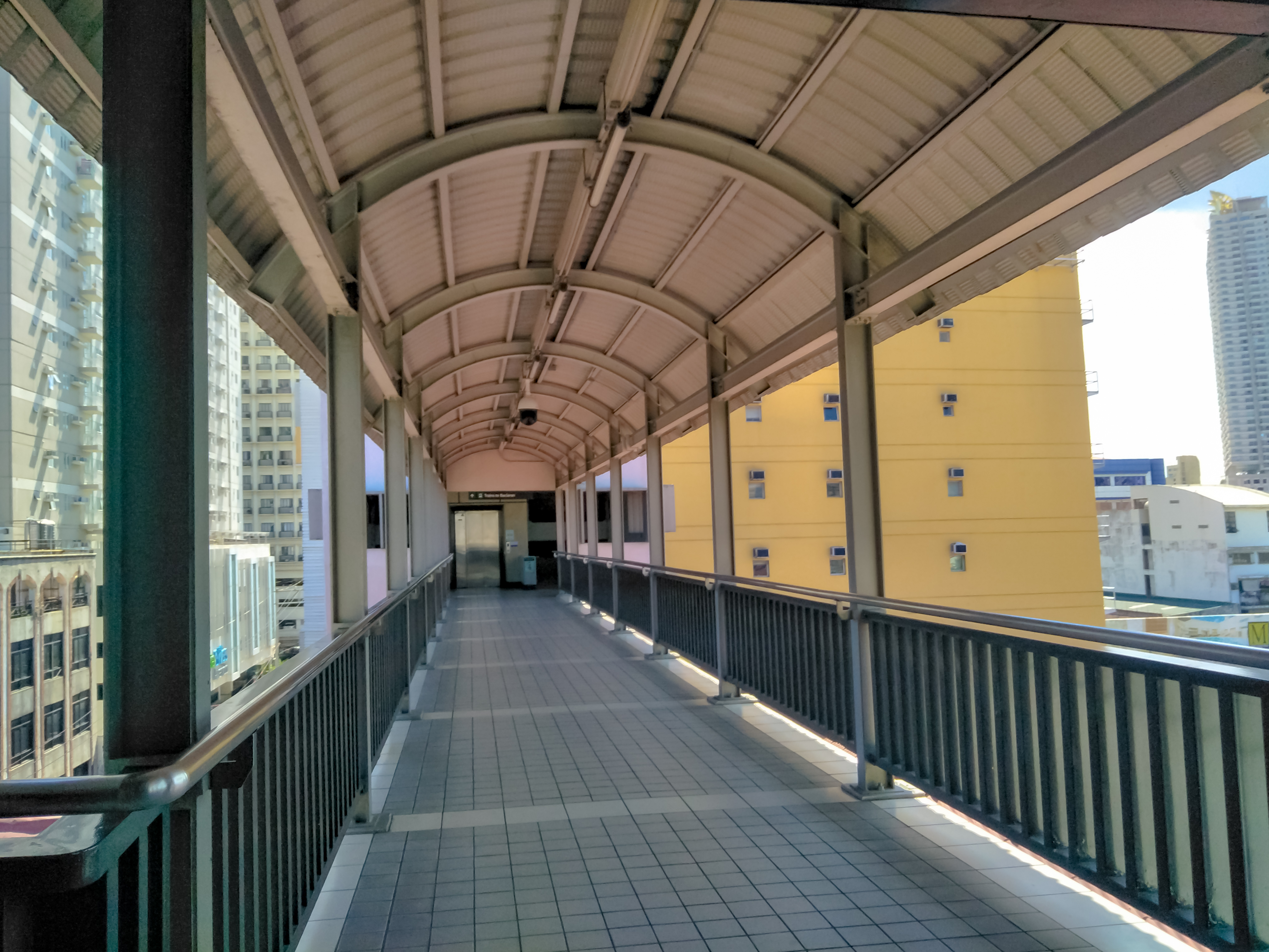
Overpass between platforms at Level 3

View of Doroteo Jose station from the elevated walkway connecting it to Recto station

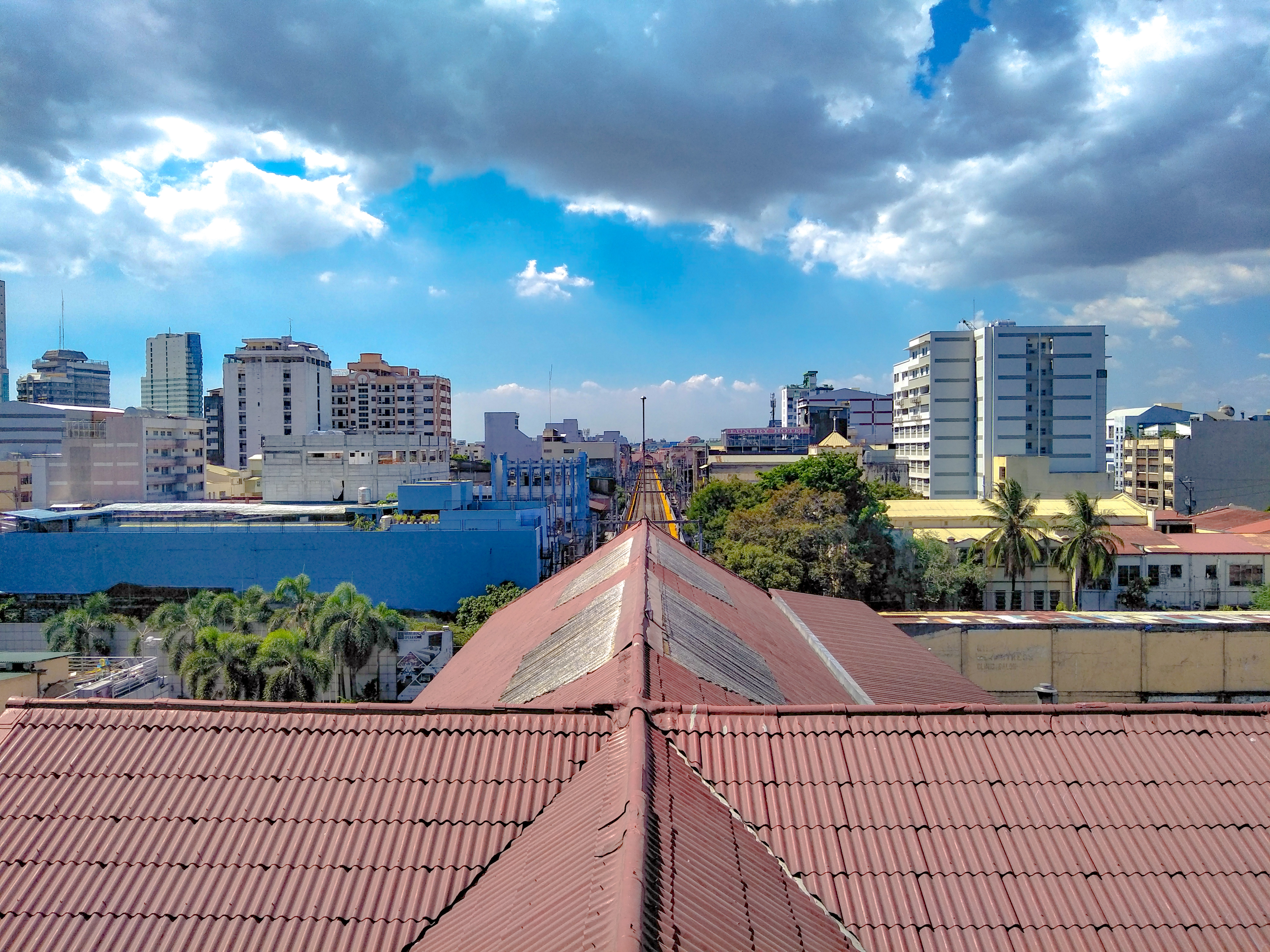
View from the overpass facing north

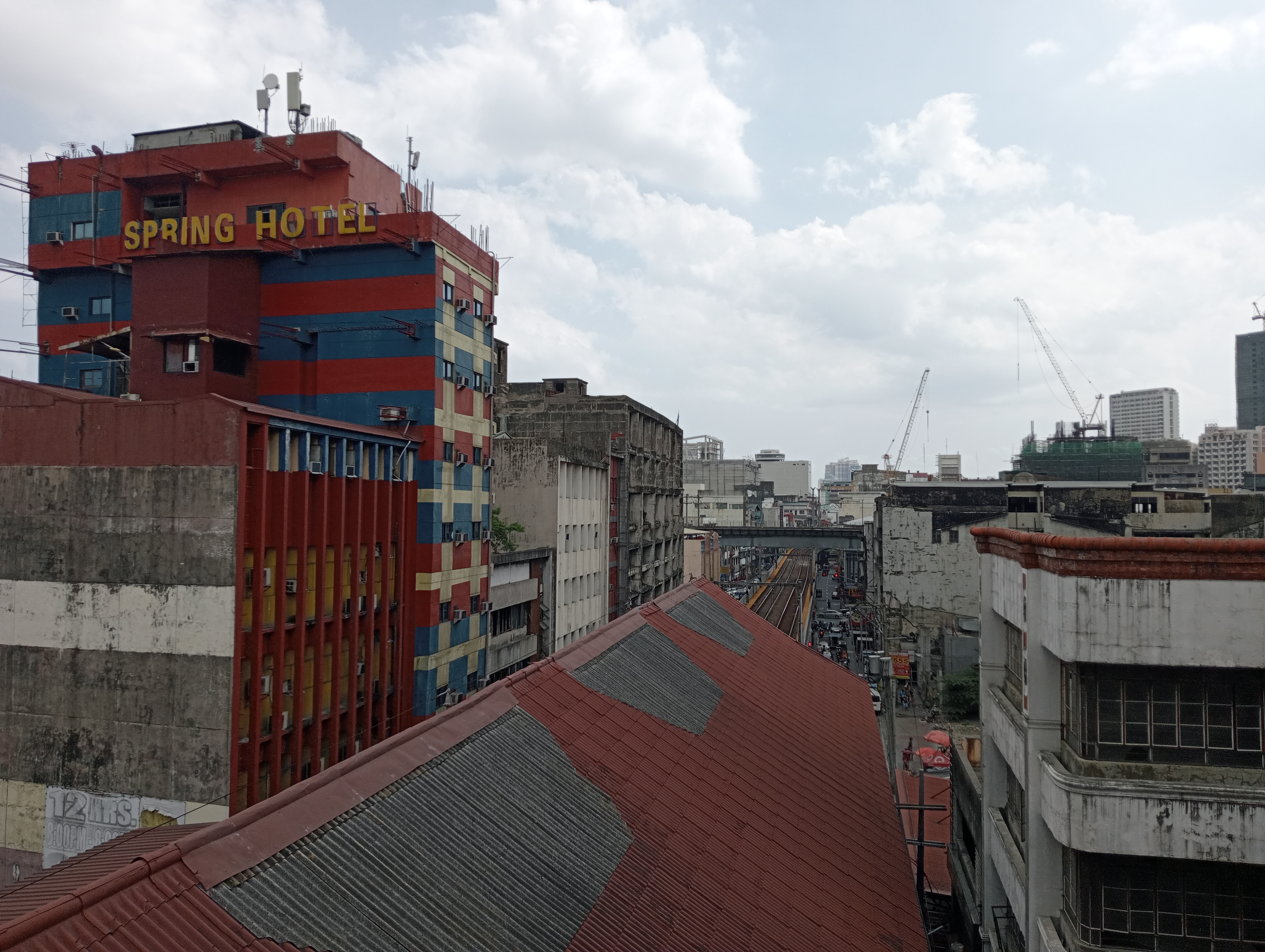
Southbound view from the station's overpass

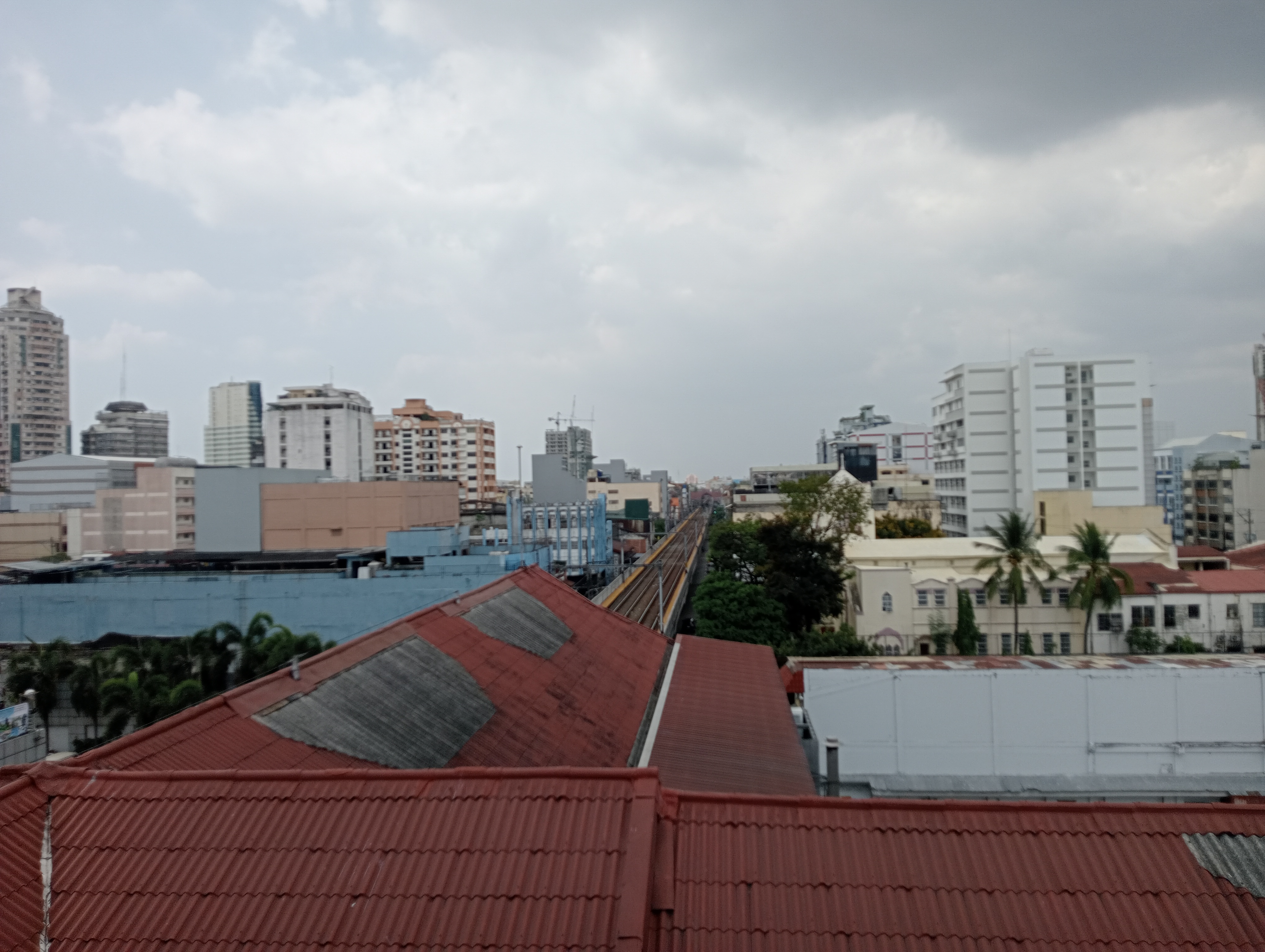
Northbound view from the station's overpass

View of the station from the east

== See also ==
- List of rail transit stations in Metro Manila
- Manila Light Rail Transit System
