= Recto station =

LRT Line 2 station in Manila

Recto
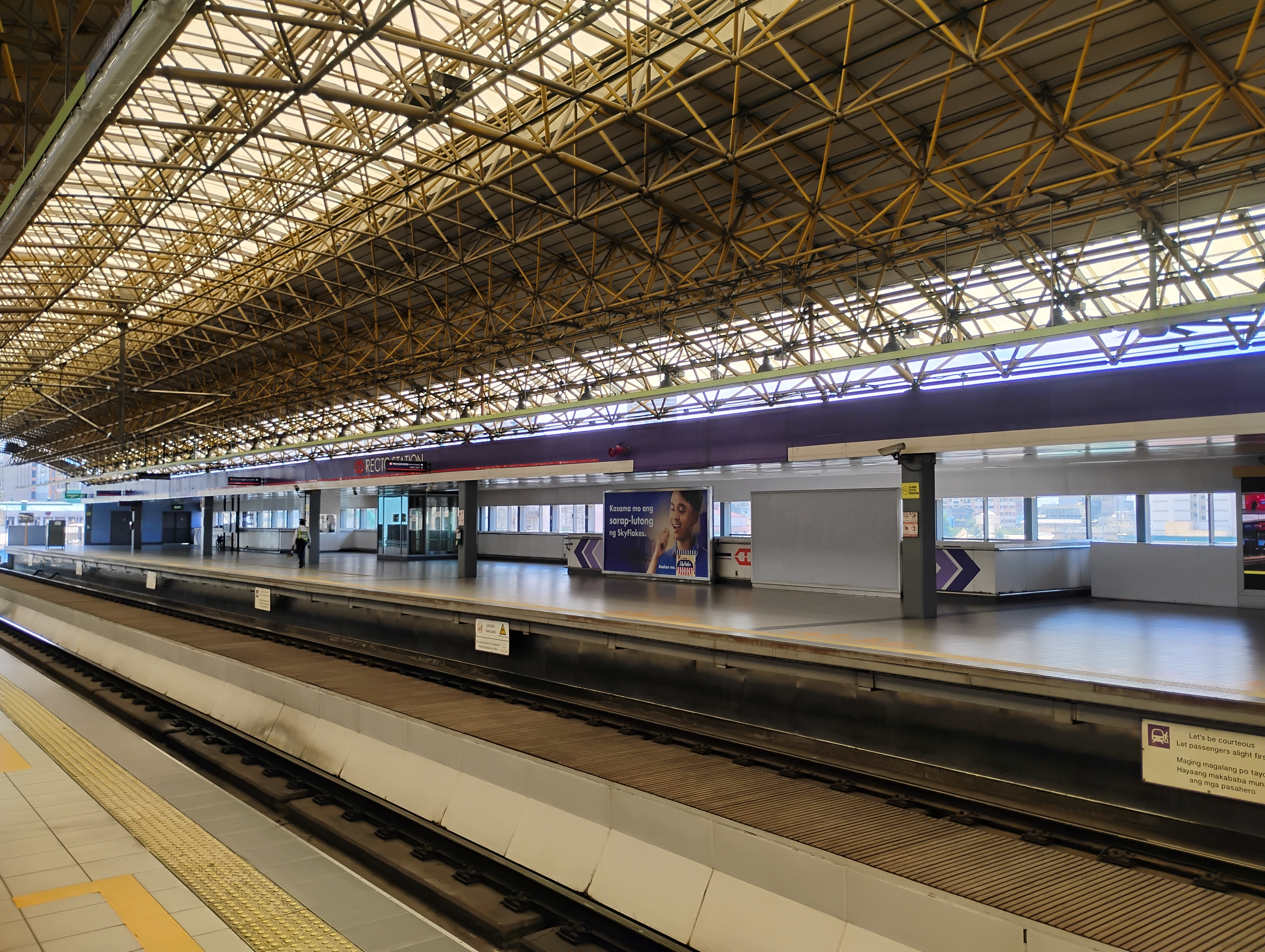

General information
- Location: Recto Avenue, Santa Cruz and Quiapo; Manila, Metro Manila; Philippines
- Coordinates: 14°36′12.59″N 120°59′00.25″E
- Owner: Department of Transportation; Light Rail Transit Authority
- Line: LRT Line 2
- Platforms: 2 (2 side)
- Tracks: 2
- Connections: Doroteo Jose; 13 19 20 21 Avenida; 42 Doroteo Jose; 2 3 5 6 7 14 17 34 38 40 49 52 54 Quiapo; Future: 8 Lerma

Construction
- Structure type: Elevated
- Parking: Yes (Isetann Recto, QQ Mall Quiapo, Dwayne Parking Services)
- Accessible: Concourse: All entrances Platforms: All platforms

Other information
- Station code: PL01

History
- Opened: October 29, 2004; 21 years ago

Services
Preceding station	Manila LRT	Following station
Legarda towards Antipolo	LRT Line 2	Terminus

Out-of-system interchange
Preceding station	Manila LRT	Following station
Bambang towards Fernando Poe Jr.	LRT Line 1 transfer at Doroteo Jose	Carriedo towards Dr. Santos
Track layout
Location
- Location within Manila Location within Metro Manila Location within Luzon Location within Philippines

Recto station is the current western terminus of the Light Rail Transit Line 2 (LRT-2) system. It is situated on Recto Avenue at the district boundary of Santa Cruz and Quiapo, Manila.

It shall be succeeded by Pier 4 as the future western terminus of the LRT-2.

== History ==
Recto station was constructed as part of Phase 2 of the LRT Line 2 project. It opened on October 29, 2004, replacing Legarda as the western terminus of the line.

== Nearby landmarks ==
The station is near popular shopping centers like Isetann Cinerama Recto, Odeon Terminal Mall, QQ Mall Quiapo, Raon Shopping Center, Cartimar Manila Shopping Center, and Arranque Market. The famous bargain capital of Divisoria and the old grand central terminal of Tutuban are also within a few minutes' commute from the station. Other nearby landmarks include Nice Hotel, the Manila Grand Opera Hotel, Fabella Memorial Hospital, and Manila City Jail (Bilibid Viejo).

Due to its position being near the University Belt, the station is also close to educational institutions such as Far Eastern University, FEU Institute of Technology, Chiang Kai Shek College, Arellano High School, University of the East, Philippine College of Criminology, Philippine College of Health Sciences, STI College Recto, Access Computer College-Manila, and Saint Stephen's High School.

== Transportation links ==
Due to its central location in the shopping and education districts of Manila, Recto station is a major transportation hub. Buses, jeepneys, tricycles, and e-trikes all stop and ply the street level.

Recto station serves as the direct transfer point for commuters riding the LRT Line 1 via an elevated walkway to Doroteo Jose station.

== Gallery ==
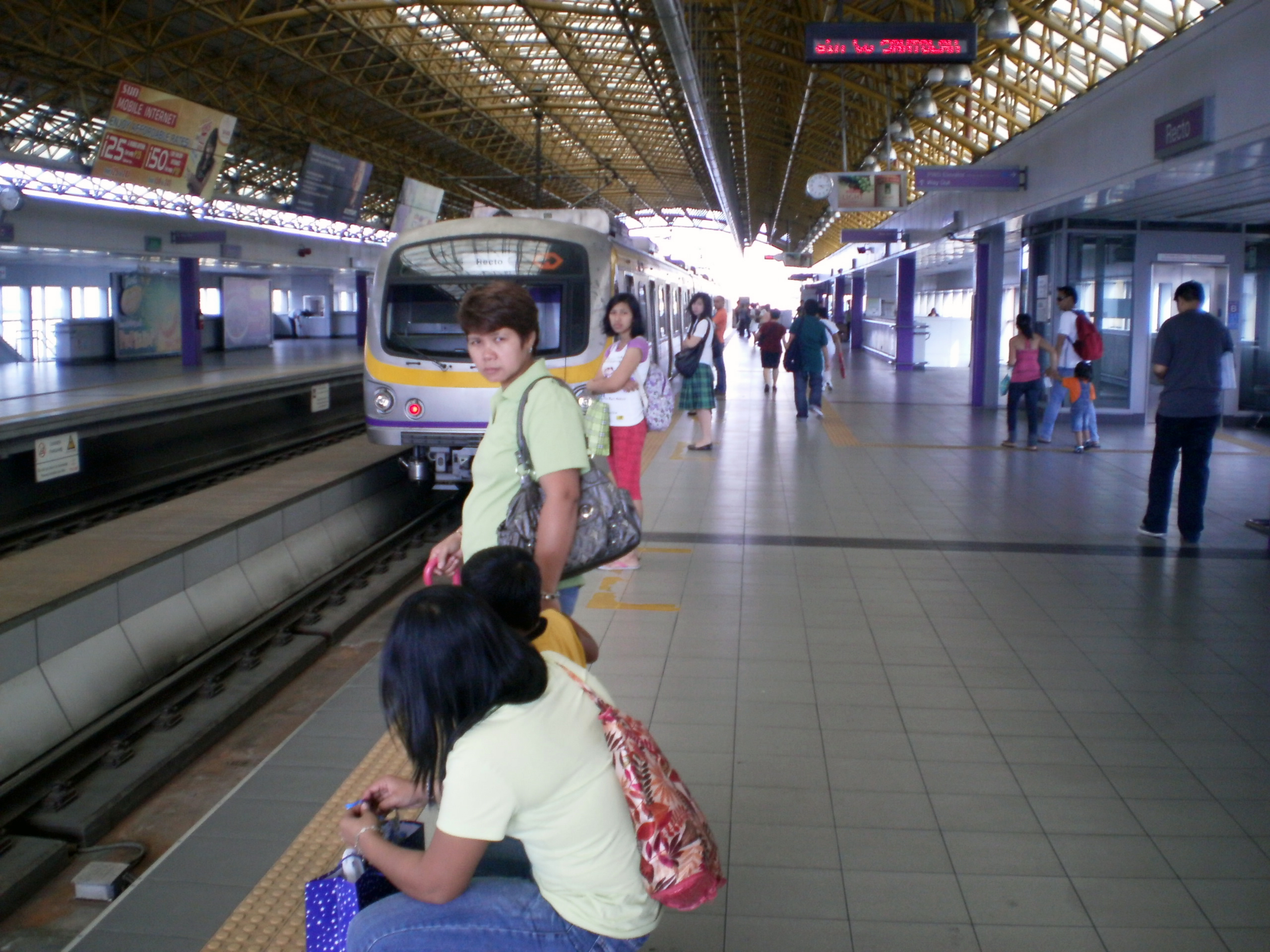
A train at the station's eastbound track

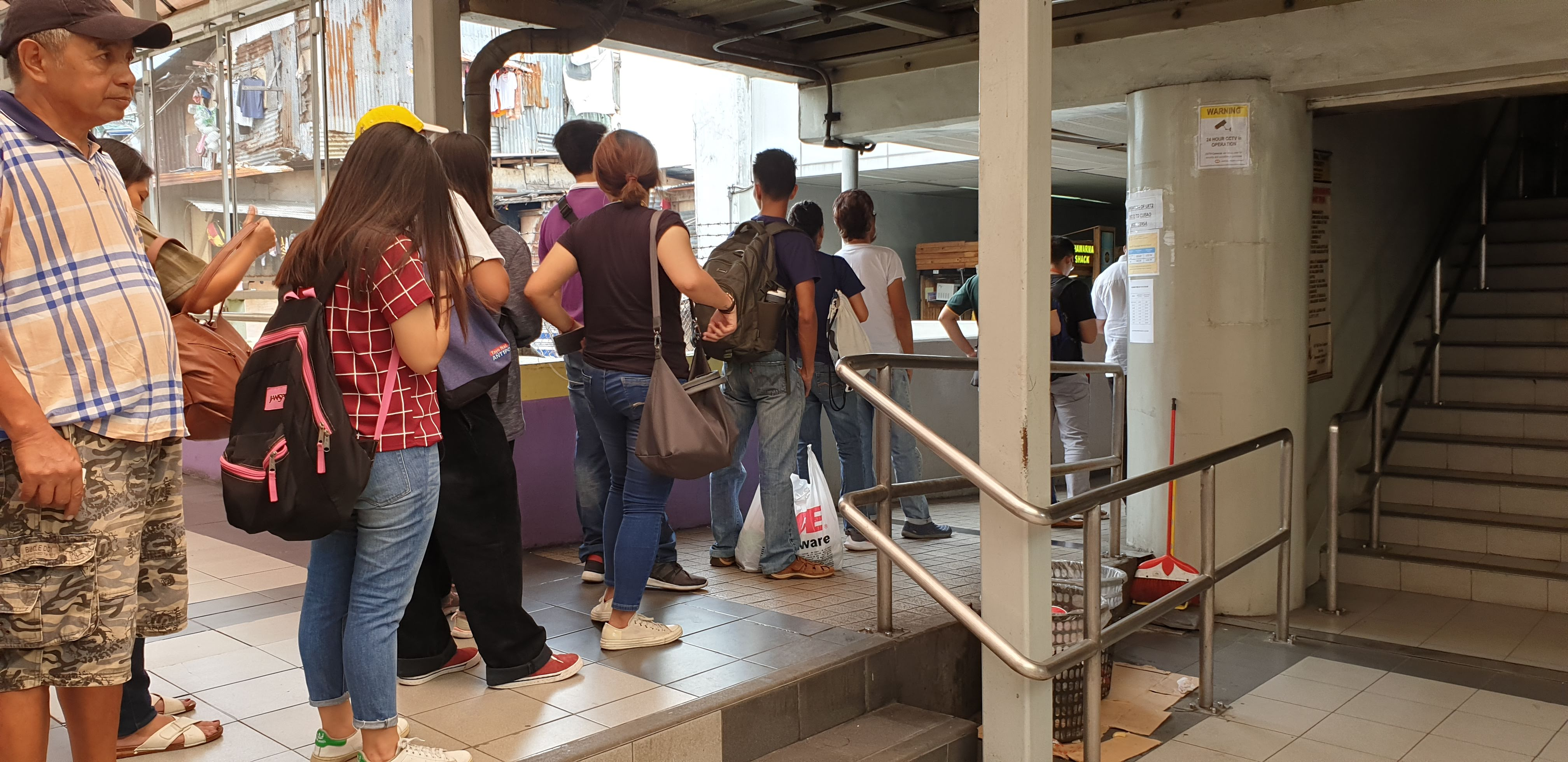
Commuters queued at the walkway entrance of the station

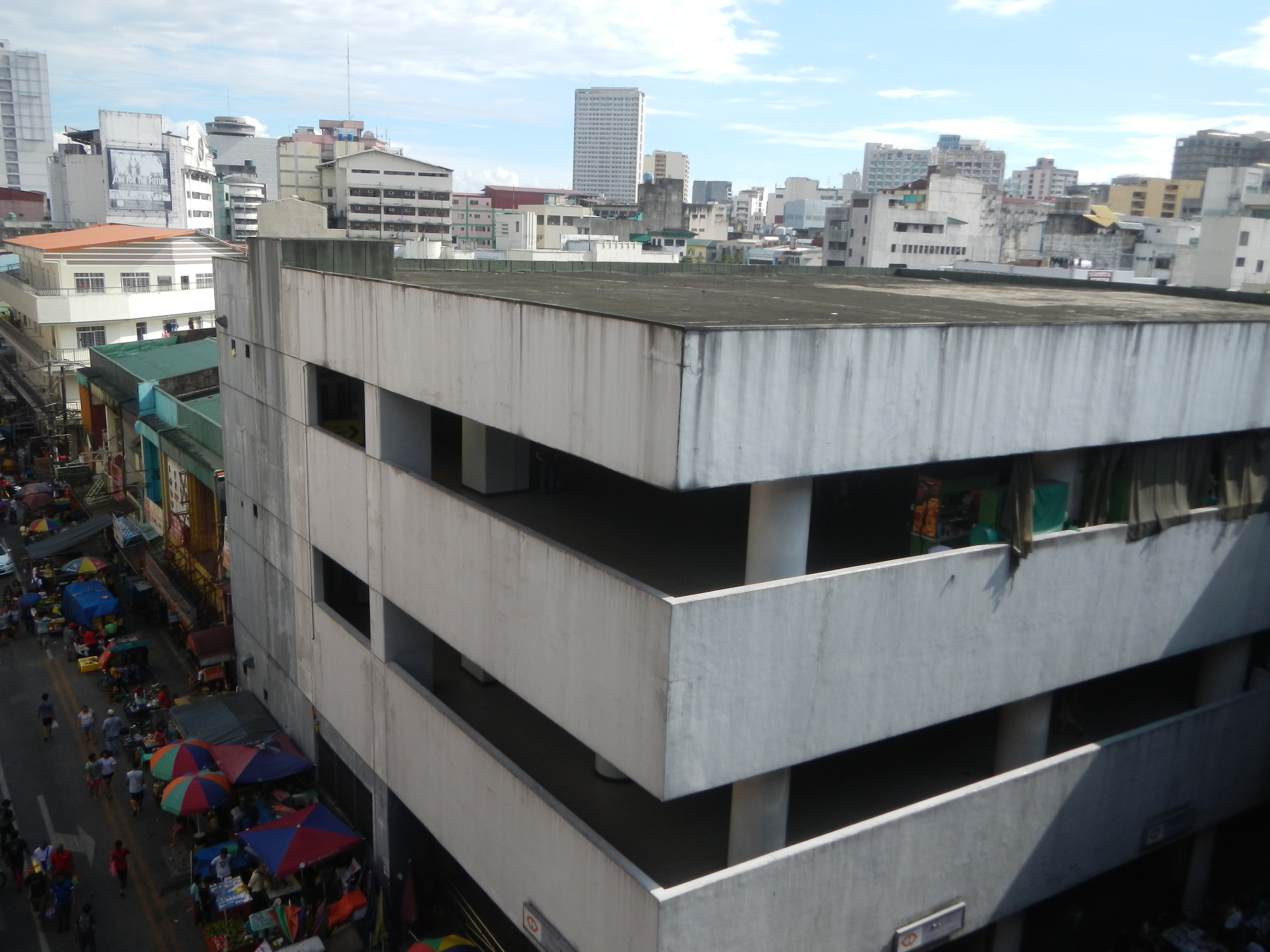
South Entrance of the station

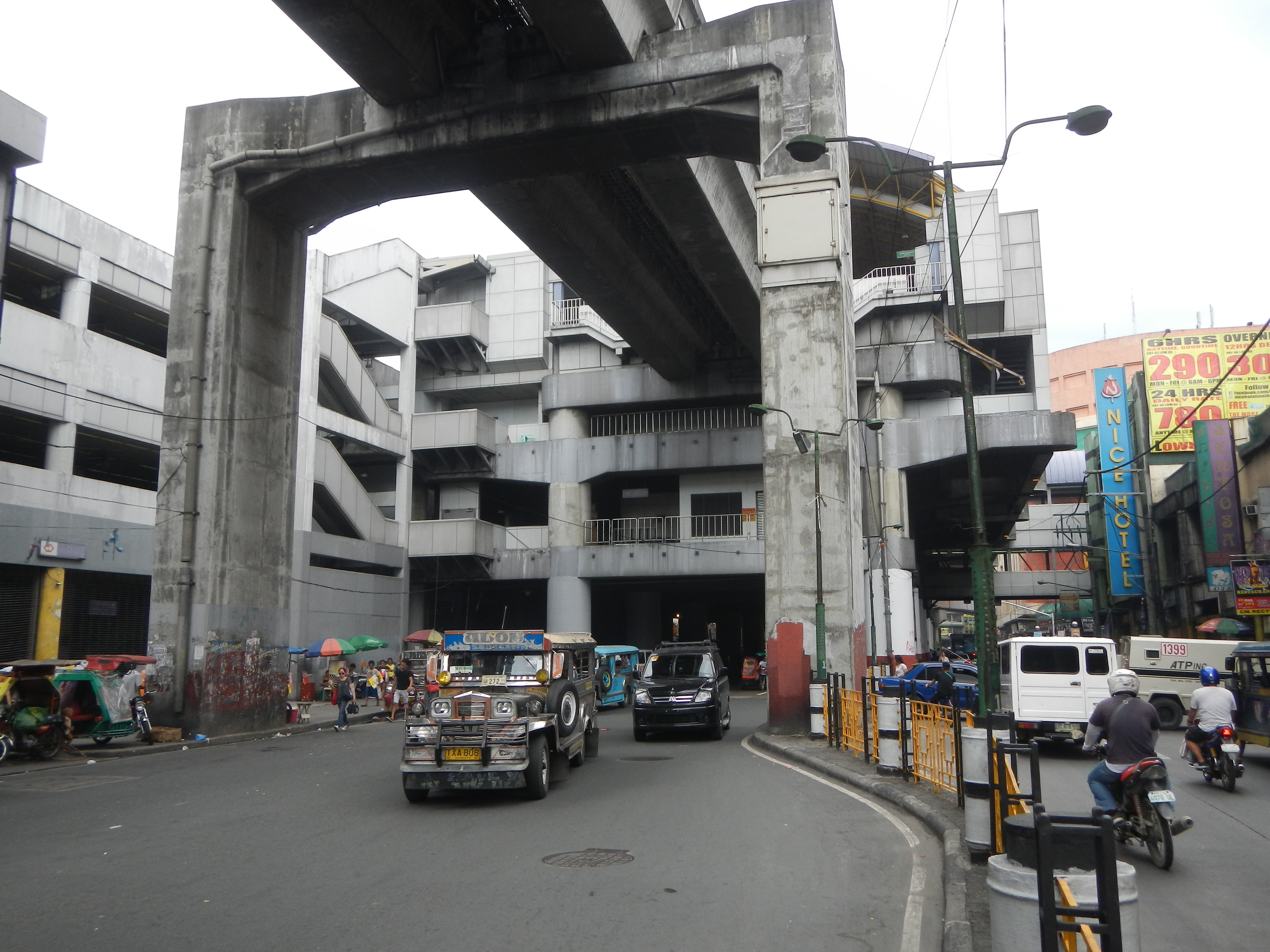
View of the station from street level

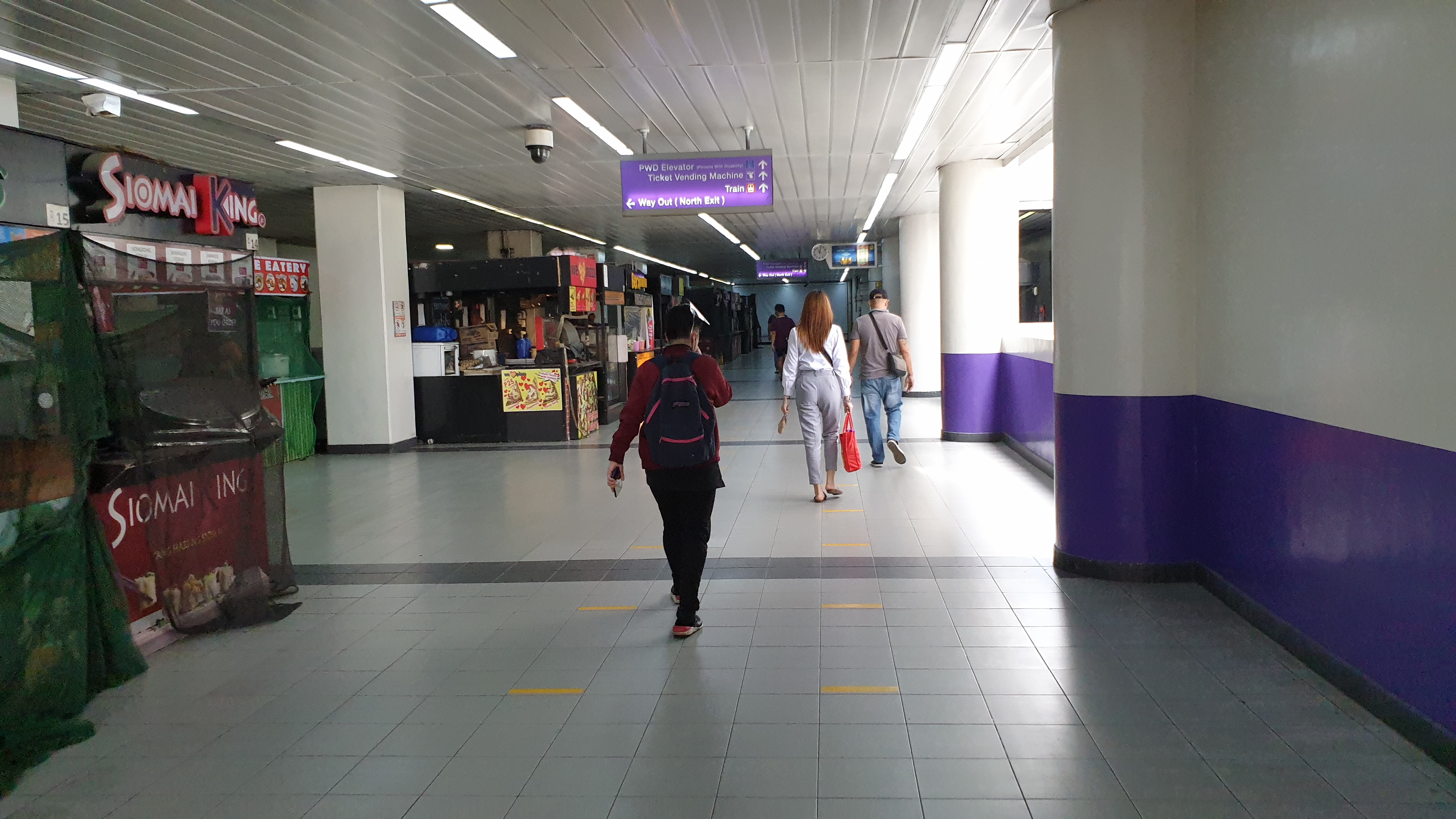
Concourse at 3rd floor
