= Manila Chinese Cemetery =

Cemetery in Santa Cruz, Manila

- 華僑義山
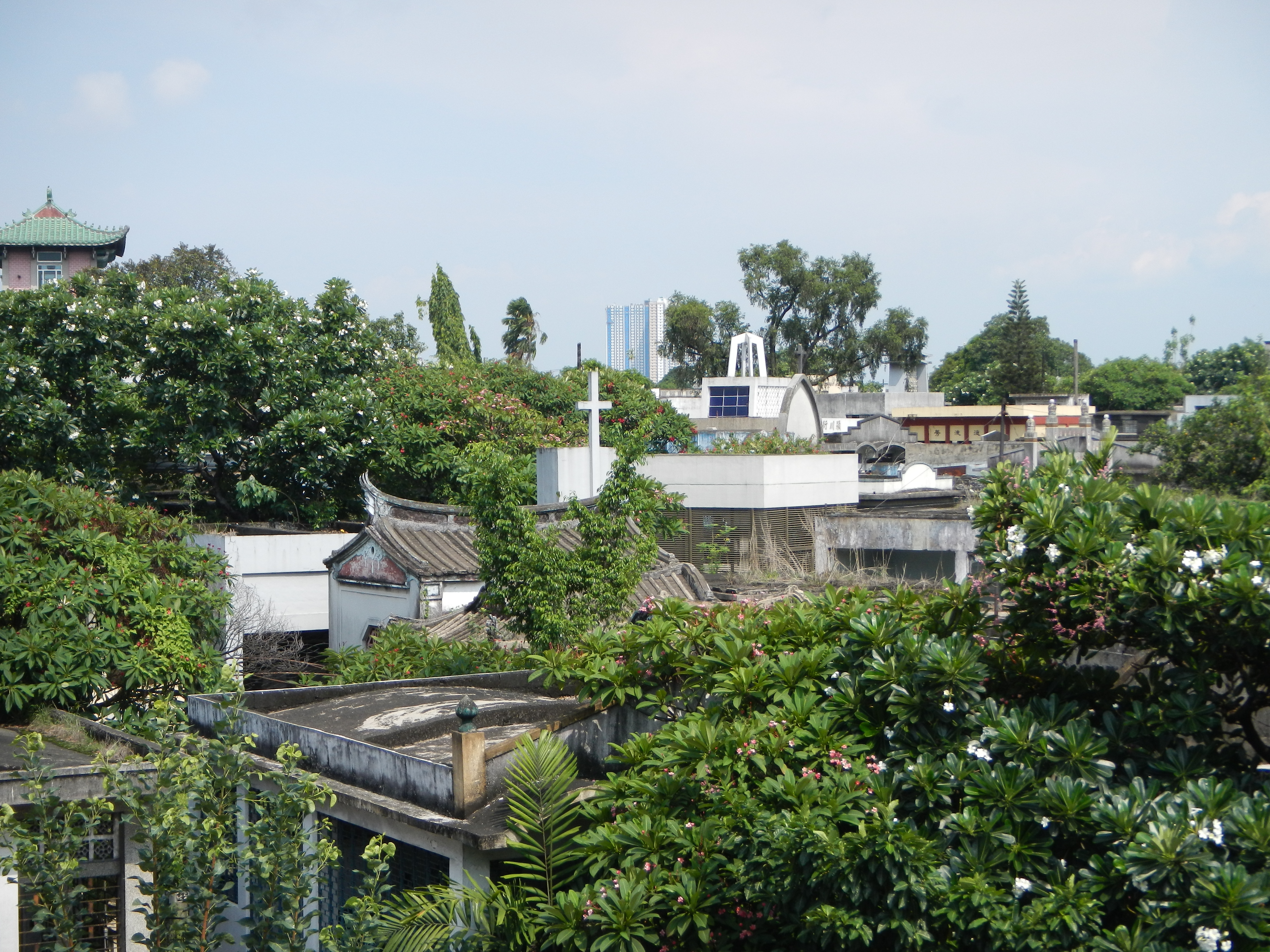
- Tombs at the Manila Chinese Cemetery
- Interactive map of Manila Chinese Cemetery

Details
- Established: 1843
- Location: Santa Cruz, Manila
- Country: Philippines
- Coordinates: 14°37′57″N 120°59′05″E
- Type: Chinese
- Owned by: Philippine-Chinese Charitable Association, Inc.
- Website: https://www.findagrave.com/cemetery/2410775

The Manila Chinese Cemetery (simplified Chinese: 华侨义山; traditional Chinese: 華僑義山; pinyin: Huáqiáo Yìshān; Pe̍h-ōe-jī: Hôa-kiâo Gī-san; lit. 'Overseas Chinese Cemetery'; Spanish: Cementerío chino de Manila) is the second oldest cemetery in Manila after La Loma Cemetery. The cemetery includes Christian, Buddhist and Taoist burials. The present-day cemetery is a vaguely trapezoidal area of about 54 hectares (130 acres) with an irregular network of roads its old pre-war part along Rizal Avenue Extension, reflecting its gradual evolution and expansion. Meanwhile, the post-war portion has three major roads bisected by minor roads, aligned northwest to southeast. Matandang Sora, coming from the main entrance in Felix Huertas going towards Chong Hock Temple, is the main road today. Before the Pacific War the main entrances faced Avenida Rizal. This northwestern is the oldest and most historically significant part of the cemetery. The cemetery was witness to many executions during World War II. Among them were Girl Scouts organizer Josefa Llanes Escoda, Filipino Brigadier General and hero during World War II and Boy Scouts of the Philippines charter member Vicente Lim, literary geniuses Liling Roces and Manuel Arguilla, star athlete-turned-guerrilla spy Virgilio Lobregat, and Chinese Consul General Yang Guangsheng. Apolinario Mabini was also buried in the cemetery before his remains were transferred to Batangas on July 23, 1956.

== History ==
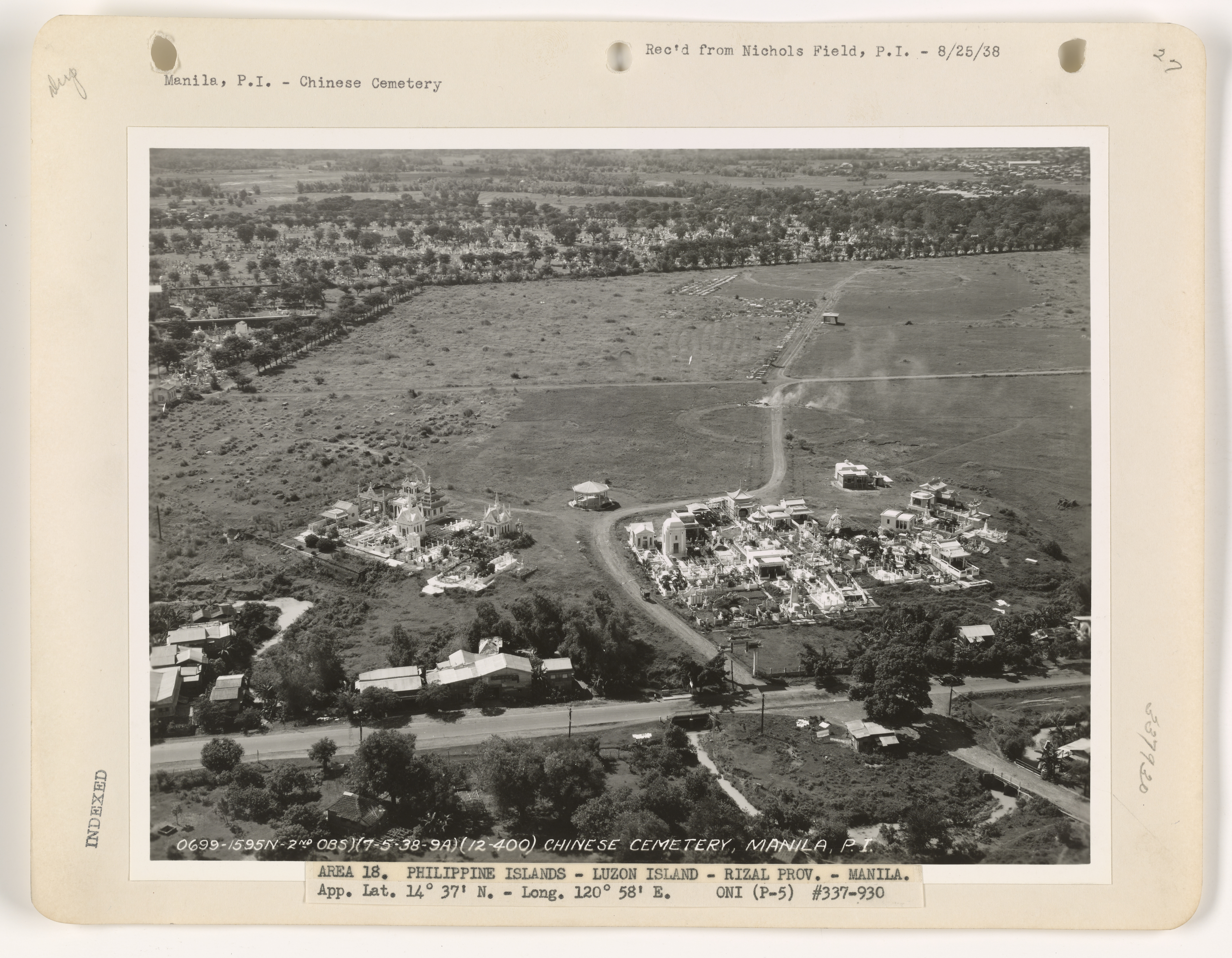
Aerial view of the cemetery, 1938

Prior to the establishment of the Manila Chinese Cemetery, Chinese who observed Buddhism had their burial grounds on a hill slope in Bangkusay, Tondo, near San Lazaro Hospital. In 1843, the Governor-General authorized the Chinese to establish a cemetery in La Loma. It was founded by Lim Ong and Carlos L. Palanca (Tan Quien-Sien) in the 1850s. It was also enlarged on its present site in 1863 when Ong, the gobernadorcillo (mayor) of the Chinese community in Binondo, purchased land in La Loma to provide a decent burial ground for Catholic and non-Catholic Chinese. It would also cater outcasts of society (like those that died from contagious diseases and people who are political enemies of the Spanish Crown) excluded from the nearby La Loma Cemetery's consecrated grounds. It was also later expanded in 1878 by Don Mariano Fernando Yu Chingco, a subsequent gobernadorcillo, when he bought land worth ₱14,000 to expand the cemetery from the Dominican Provincial which used to own the Hacienda de La Loma from which the cemetery was built. This cemetery catered the poor Chinese who could not afford to return to China to bury or send their dead.

== Temples and memorials ==
=== Chong Hock Tong Temple ===
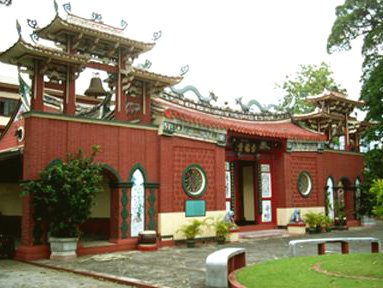
Chong Hock Tong Temple, prior to 2015

Built in 1878, the Chong Hock Tong Temple (Chinese: 崇福堂; pinyin: Chóngfútáng; Pe̍h-ōe-jī: Chông-hok-tông), prior to its demolition in 2015, was the oldest pre-War Chinese memorial temple in Manila. Its architecture was reminiscent of (but not as elaborate as) southern Fujian temples, as well as those in Indonesia, Singapore, Malaysia, & Taiwan, with their colorful friezes and uniquely upturned eaves; a unique feature were its lateral belfries appended at each end, an obvious Christian influence.

Its demolition on March 15, 2015, by the cemetery's management body Philippine Chinese Charitable Association (PCCA), supposedly due to termite damage, was denounced by heritage conservationists as a violation of R.A. 10066 (National Heritage Act of 2009), despite not being declared by the National Historical Commission of the Philippines (NHCP) as a historical landmark. The PCCA countered, claiming that the temple was on private property.

Supposedly the temple was to be rebuilt in a similar manner by a team of Taiwanese craftsmen & artisans, but was actually reconstructed as an all-stone edifice by mainland Chinese builders, which was then unveiled in a ceremony on June 14, 2017.

It is the only Chinese memorial temple to simultaneously host Taoist, Buddhist, & Christian services, the three major religious beliefs of the Filipino Chinese community. A unique feature that reflects this religious syncretism is the main altar laden with figures of the crucified Christ, the Virgin Mary, Catholic saints, Taoist Deities, Lord Buddha, Amitabha & prominent Buddhist Bodhisattvas (such as Guanyin, Mahāsthāmaprāpta, & Kṣitigarbha).

=== Liat See Tong Hall ===
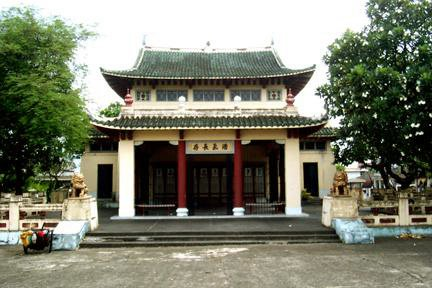
Liat See Tong - Martyrs Hall

Liat See Tong Temple (Chinese: 烈士堂; pinyin: Lièshìtáng; Pe̍h-ōe-jī: Lia̍t-sǐ-tông; lit. 'Martyrs Hall') was built in the early 1950s in honor of the 10 Chinese community leaders who were executed by the Japanese during World War II.

Due to heightened anti-Japanese sentiment among the Chinese stemming from the Second Sino-Japanese War (preceded in 1931 by the Mukden Incident & the immediate Japanese invasion of Manchuria), the Japanese were wary of the potential trouble the Chinese might cause; as soon as Japan invaded the Philippines, one of their first activities after occupation was the rounding up & subsequent execution of prominent Chinese community leaders.

Above the entrance beam is the dedicatory quote, "May their noble spirits ever endure" (simplified Chinese: 浩气长存; traditional Chinese: 浩氣長存; pinyin: Hàoqì chángcún; Pe̍h-ōe-jī: Hōⁿ-khì tiông-chûn).

=== Kong Tek Tong Hall ===
Kong Tek Tong Hall (Chinese: 功德堂; pinyin: Gōngdétáng; Pe̍h-ōe-jī: Kong-tek-tông) serves as a columbarium for less-affluent burials. Their services extend to the cemetery's perimeter wall niches, where usage is free of charge.

=== Carlos L. Palanca Memorial ===
Located in front of Chong Hock Tong Temple, to which he is credited for financing its construction, the Carlos Palanca Memorial honors Carlos L. Palanca, Born June 06, 1844 (Tan Quien-Sien) (Note: Also known as Tan Chuey-Liong or Tan Chuey-Leong (simplified Chinese: 陈最良; traditional Chinese: 陳最良; pinyin: Chén Zuìliáng; Pe̍h-ōe-jī: Tân Chòe-liông), and Tan Chueco/Tanchueco (simplified Chinese: 陈最哥; traditional Chinese: 陳最哥; Pe̍h-ōe-jī: Tân Chòe-ko).) (simplified Chinese: 陈谦善; traditional Chinese: 陳謙善; pinyin: Chén Qiānshàn; Pe̍h-ōe-jī: Tân Khiam-Siān), illustrious 19th-century Chinese community leader and businessman. It was through his efforts as gobernadorcillo that the cemetery & Chong Hock Tong Temple were built; as only baptized Catholics were permitted burial in the city cemeteries (like the nearby La Loma Cemetery), the need arose for the non-Christian Chinese (termed by the Spanish authorities as Chino infieles, "infidel Chinese") to have their own cemetery.

=== Cemetery Renovation Memorial ===
The Manila Chinese Cemetery Renovation Memorial (simplified Chinese: 整建华侨义山纪念碑; traditional Chinese: 整建華僑義山紀念碑; pinyin: Zhěngjiàn Huáqiáo Yìshān Jìniànbēi; Pe̍h-ōe-jī: Chéng-kiàn Hôa-kiâo Gī-san Kì-liām-pi) is located adjacent to the front of Liat See Tong Hall.

=== Apolinario Mabini Pyramid ===
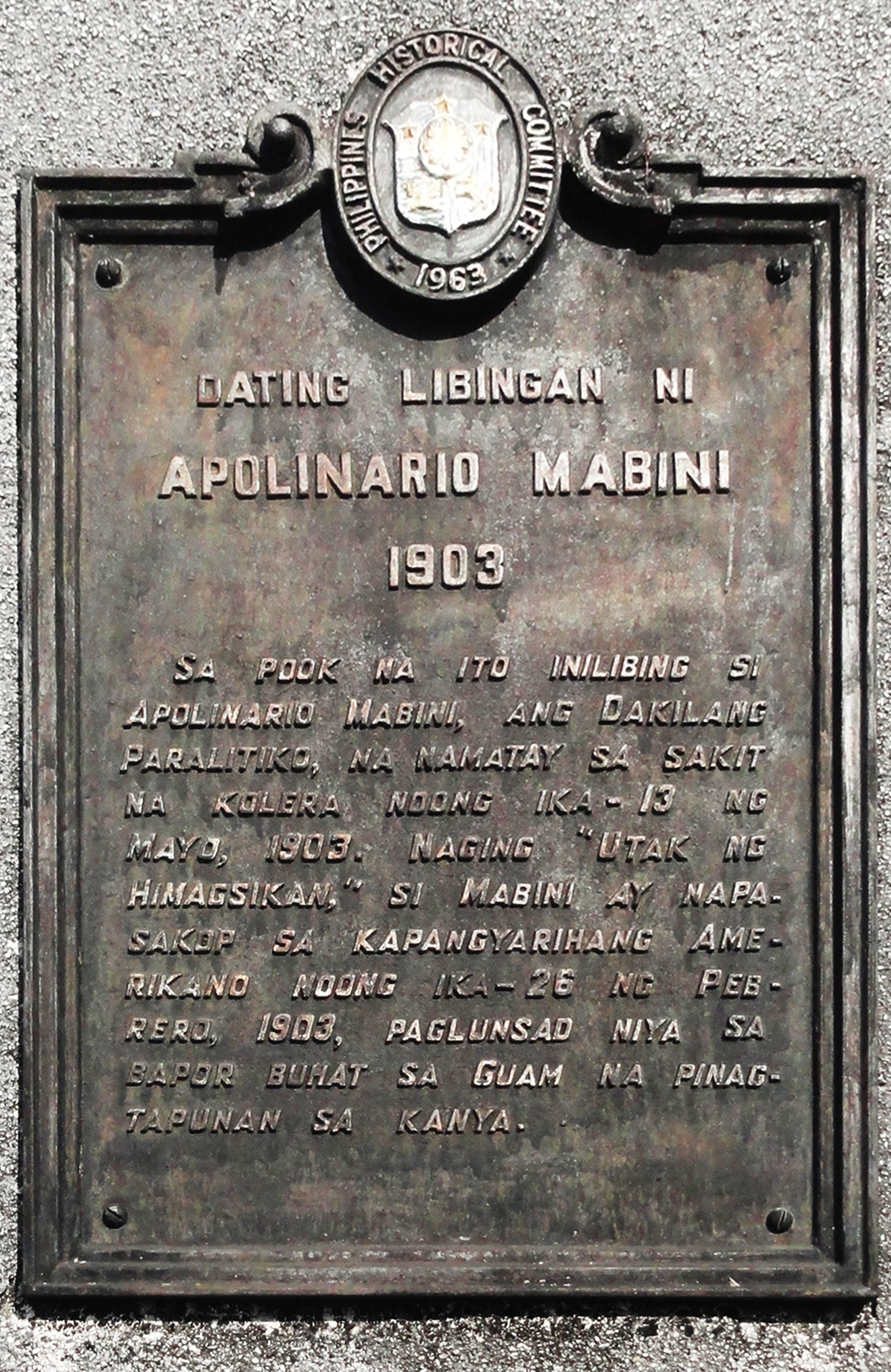
"Dating Libingan ni Apolinario Mabini, 1903" historical marker

Located along a street named in his honor (馬美爾路), Apolinario Mabini's former burial site is marked by a triangular pyramid on a raised pedestal, symbolic of his Masonic beliefs (hence his original interment at the cemetery in 1903); and a historical marker by the NHCP (then the "Philippine Historical Committee") affixed in 1963. His remains were exhumed in this place and transferred to the Mausoleo de los Veteranos de la Revolución. Years later, it was reburied in his hometown at Tanauan, Batangas.

=== Dr. Clarence Kuangson Young Memorial ===
Built in 1948 by the Filipino Chinese community, the Dr. Clarence Kuangson Young Memorial (simplified Chinese: 杨光泩总领事暨殉职馆员纪念碑; traditional Chinese: 楊光泩總領事暨殉軄館員紀念碑; pinyin: Yáng Guāngshēng Zǒnglǐngshì jì Xùnzhí Guǎnyuán Jìniànbēi; Pe̍h-ōe-jī: Iông Koang-soⁿ Chóng-léng-sū kap Sūn-chit Koán-oân Kì-liām-pi; lit. 'Consul-General Yang Guangsheng and Consulate Staff Killed in their Lines of Duty Memorial') pays tribute to the martyrdom of Dr. Clarence Kuangson Young (楊光泩; August 8, 1900 – April 17, 1942), former Consul General (1939–1942) of the Republic of China to the Philippine Islands, and his 7 consular staff members, who refused General MacArthur's offers of evacuation as it was their diplomatic duty to protect the overseas (Chinese) community, and that they will not leave their posts without any authorization.

The 8 diplomats were among the first of the Chinese community to be rounded up by the Japanese authorities, and after 3 months of incarceration, continuous threats, suppression, & torture, were eventually massacred and buried within the cemetery grounds.

At the memorial base is a plaque bearing Dr. Clarence Kuangson Young's name, title, & calligraphy by Chiang Kai-shek bearing the elegiac couplet, "Allegiance towards lofty ideals" (Chinese: 効忠成志; pinyin: xiàozhōng chéng zhì; Pe̍h-ōe-jī: hāu-tiong chhiâⁿ chì).

=== Philippine Chinese Anti-Japanese War Memorial Complex ===
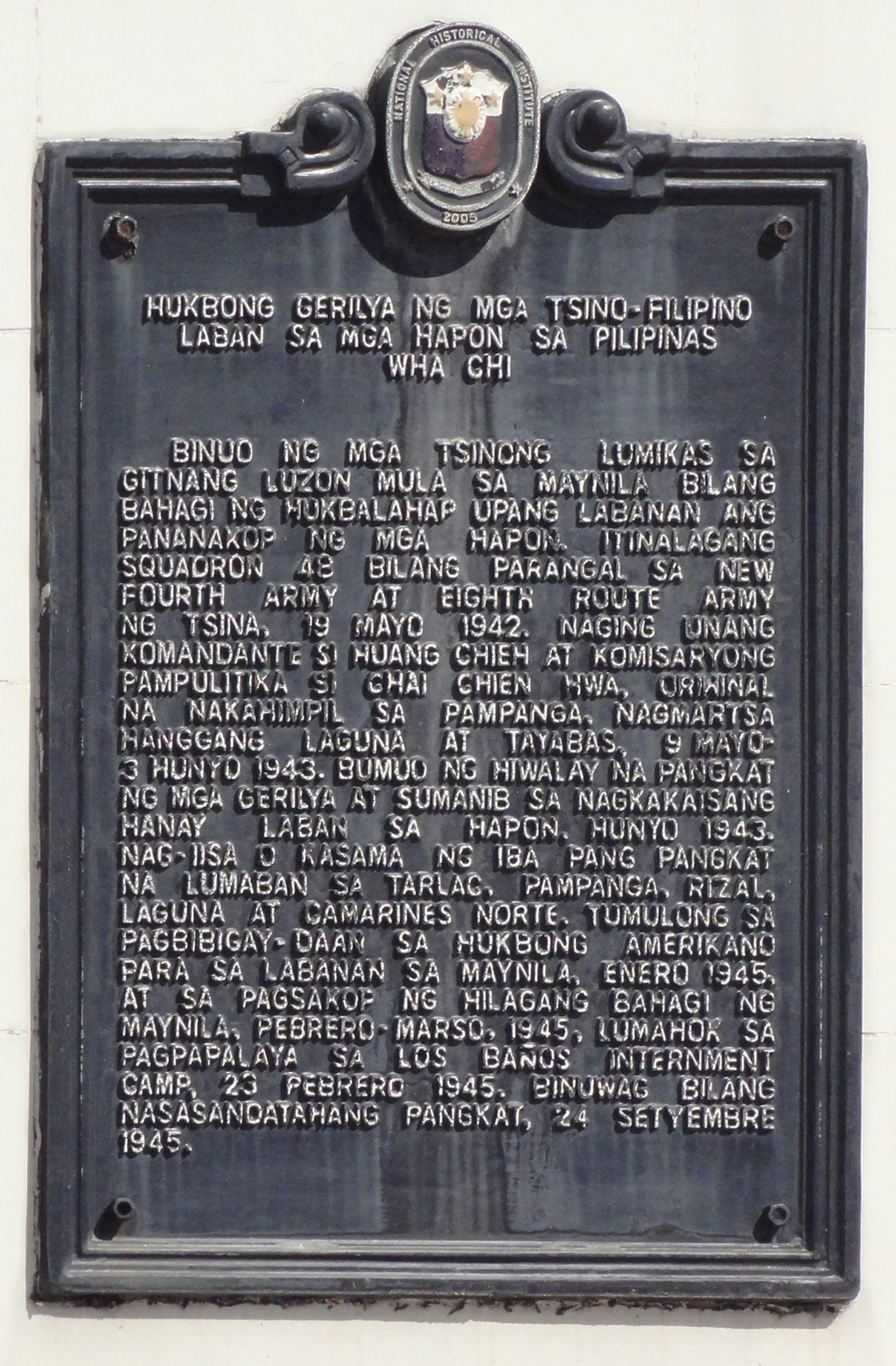
NHCP Historical Marker

Located at the corner of Consul General Young (光泩跆) & Matandang Sora (Note: The cemetery's road signage appears as "Chun Chin Road (尊親路)", named in honor of Mariano Fernando (or Fernandez) Yu Chingco (simplified Chinese: 杨尊亲; traditional Chinese: 楊尊親; pinyin: Yáng Zūnqīn; Pe̍h-ōe-jī: Iûⁿ Chun-chhin, hispanized as "Yu Chingco" or "Yu-Chingco" (simplified Chinese: 杨亲哥; traditional Chinese: 楊親哥; Pe̍h-ōe-jī: Iûⁿ-chhin-ko)), who as gobernardorcillo in 1876 sent a petition to the Governor-General seeking permission for further expansion of the La Loma Cemetery, which was conditionally approved in 1877. The land subsequently bought from the Dominican Order in 1878 eventually became the current Manila Chinese Cemetery.) Roads, the complex consists of the Philippine Chinese Anti-Japanese War Memorial (simplified Chinese: 菲律滨华侨抗日烈士纪念碑; traditional Chinese: 菲律濱華僑抗日烈士紀念碑; pinyin: Fēilǜbīn Huáqiáo Kàngrì Lièshì Jìniànbēi; Pe̍h-ōe-jī: Hui-li̍p-pin Hôa-kiâo Khòng-li̍t Lia̍t-sǐ Kì-liām-pi; lit. 'Philippine Overseas Chinese Anti-Japan Resistance Martyrs Memorial') stele built in 1979, & behind it the much larger Philippine Chinese Anti-Japanese War Memorial Hall (simplified Chinese: 菲律滨华侨抗日纪念馆; traditional Chinese: 菲律濱華僑抗日紀念館; pinyin: Fēilǜbīn Huáqiáo Kàngrì Jìniànguǎn; Pe̍h-ōe-jī: Hui-li̍p-pin Hôa-kiâo Khòng-li̍t Kì-liām-koán; lit. 'Philippine Overseas Chinese Anti-Japan Resistance Memorial Hall'). These structures commemorate the combined resistance efforts of the Filipino & Chinese communities during World War II.

Two historical markers from the NHCP commemorating the Wha-Chi guerilla forces (1994 & 2005) are affixed on each side of the entrance of the Memorial Hall.

=== Sun Yat-sen's Motto ===
Along Consul General Young Road is Sun Yat-sen's personal motto, "What is under heaven is for all" (simplified Chinese: 天下为公; traditional Chinese: 天下為公; pinyin: tiānxià wéi gōng; Pe̍h-ōe-jī: thian-hā ûi kong; lit. 'A public and common spirit ruled all under the sky') inscribed on the street-facing rear wall of a private plot.

=== Ruby Tower Memorial ===
Built in 1974 and located behind Liat See Tong Temple, the August 2, 1968, Ruby Tower Memorial (simplified Chinese: 渝美八二惨案纪念碑; traditional Chinese: 渝美八二慘案紀念碑; pinyin: Yúměi Bāèr Cǎnàn Jìniànbēi; Pe̍h-ōe-jī: Lû-bí Poeh-nn̄g Chhám-àn Kì-liām-pi) is dedicated to the 260 mostly Filipino-Chinese victims who perished in the collapse of the Ruby Tower building in Doroteo Jose corner Teodoro Alonzo Streets Santa Cruz, Manila during the 1968 Casiguran earthquake.

Save for a portion of the first & second floors at its northern end (presently preserved as a separate memorial hall to the victims), the entire six-story building collapsed, triggering allegations of poor design & construction, as well as use of low-quality building materials, Today Stand Memorial Hall in memory of the victims of earthquake.

== Ancestry ==
According to a study of around 30,000 gravestones in the Manila Chinese Cemetery with marked birthplaces or ancestral cities of the interred, 89.26% were from within the Southern Min region in Southern Fujian province, while 9.86% were from Cantonese regions in Guangdong (Canton) province. More specifically on those of the Southern Min region, 65.01% hailed from Jinjiang (晉江; Chìn-kang) [from coastal Quanzhou], 17.25% from Nan’an (南安; Lâm-oaⁿ) [from coastal Quanzhou], 7.94% from Xiamen (廈門; Ē-mn̂g) (Xiamen city proper), 2.90% from Hui’an (惠安; Hūi-oaⁿ) [from coastal Quanzhou], 1.52% from Longxi (龍溪; Liông-khe) [within Longhai, coastal Zhangzhou], 1.21% from Siming (思明; Su-bêng) [within Xiamen], 1.14% from Quanzhou (泉州; Choân-chiu) (Quanzhou city proper), 1.10% from Tong’an (同安; Tâng-oaⁿ) [from coastal Xiamen], 0.83% from Shishi (石狮; Chio̍h-sai) [from coastal Quanzhou], 0.57% from Yongchun (永春; Éng-chhun) [from inland Quanzhou], and 0.53% from Anxi (安溪; An-khoe) [from inland Quanzhou].

== Notable burials ==
- Dee C. Chuan (1888–1940), founder of the first Chinese bank in the Philippines (Chinabank), the Philippines' oldest existing Chinese-language newspaper Chinese Commercial News; as well as the war-time resistance group "Philippine Chinese Resist-the-Enemy Association" (simplified Chinese: 菲律宾华侨援助抗敌委员会; traditional Chinese: 菲律賓華僑援助抗敵委員會; pinyin: Fēilǜbīn Huáqiáo Yuánzhù Kàngdí Wěiyuán huì; Pe̍h-ōe-jī: Hui-li̍p-pin Hôa-kiâo Oan-chō͘ Khòng-tia̍k Úi-oân Hōe; lit. 'Philippine Overseas Chinese Assistance Against the Enemy Association'), known simply by its shortened name "Khong Tiak Hue" (simplified Chinese: 抗敌会; traditional Chinese: 抗敵會; pinyin: Kàngdí huì; Pe̍h-ōe-jī: Khòng-tia̍k Hōe; lit. 'Resist the Enemy Association') that campaigned for a Japanese trade boycott in the Philippines
- Ma Mon Luk (1896–1961), Chinese cuisine restaurateur known for Mami soup; along with his 2 wives
- Brig. Gen. Vicente P. Lim (1888–1944), Filipino Brigadier General during World War II
- Family of G.A. Cu Unjieng Mausoleum - Guillermo A. Cu-Unjieng, Sr. (邱允衡; Qiu Yunheng (November 26, 1866-October 17, 1953 age 87) founder of The Yek Tong Lin Fire & Marine Insurance Co., Ltd. (renamed Phil. First Insurance Co., Inc. & The Yek Tong Lin Loan Co., Ltd. Together with Franciso "Paco" R. Osorio, Sr.) and wife Dominga Ayala-CuUnjieng (August 4. 1877-December 2, 1957); Plato Chan (March 14, 1930-January 18, 2006) illustrator of The Good-Luck Horse and Anne Chu Chan (September 17, 1928-October 28, 2010); Victoria Fe A. Cu-Unjieng (September 27, 1918-July 24, 1997); His Sister-In-Law Florentina Coronado (March 14, 1846-June 14, 1938); Guillermo died at San Pedro, Laguna; his father Eduardo Pistolera Cu-Jike (邱季科) was born on January 01, 1867 in Quo Shang (厝上); his mother was born on 5 November 1837 as Zhang Ge-Niang (張格娘) - Guillermo was among the group of 11 Filipino-Chinese businessmen invited by founder Dee C. Chuan to a dinner of Orient Business Club, to establish Chinabank which opened on Aug. 16, 1920.
- Family of Domingo Yu Chu Mausoleum - Lily Monteverde's parents Domingo Yu Chu, Profetiza Buban Yu and Bienvenido Yu

== Gallery ==
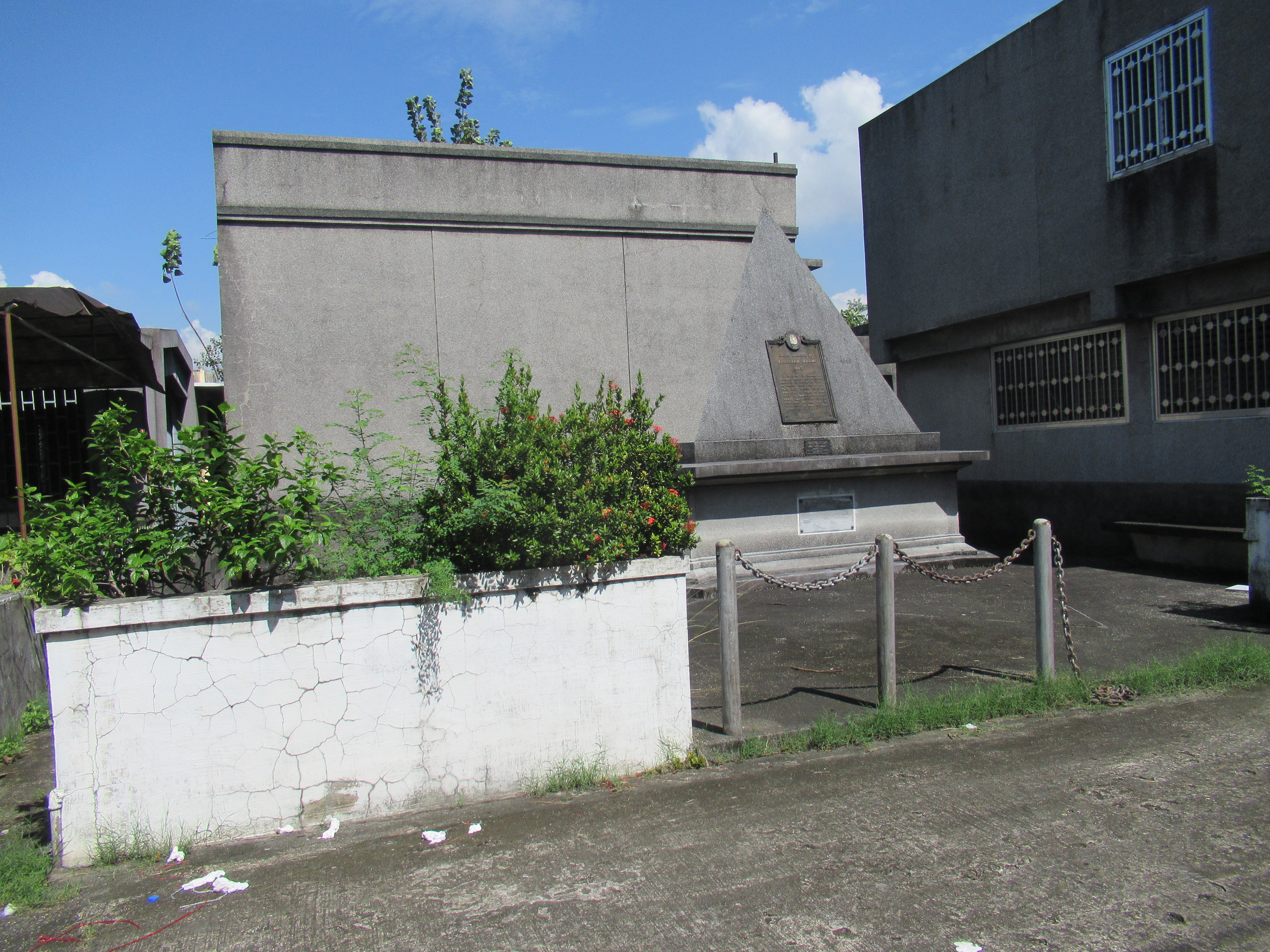
Apolinario Mabini Pyramid

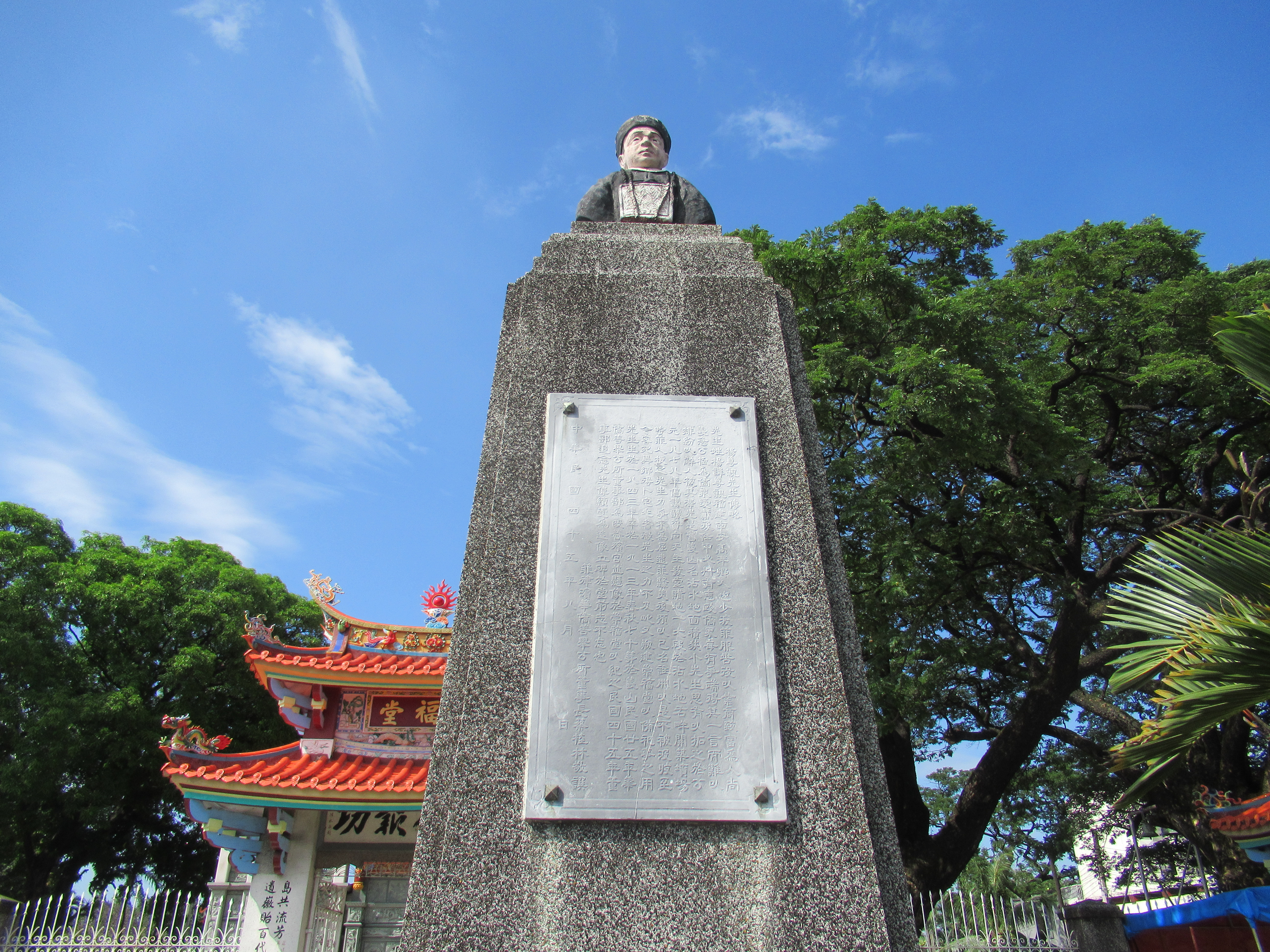
Capitan Carlos L. Palanca Memorial

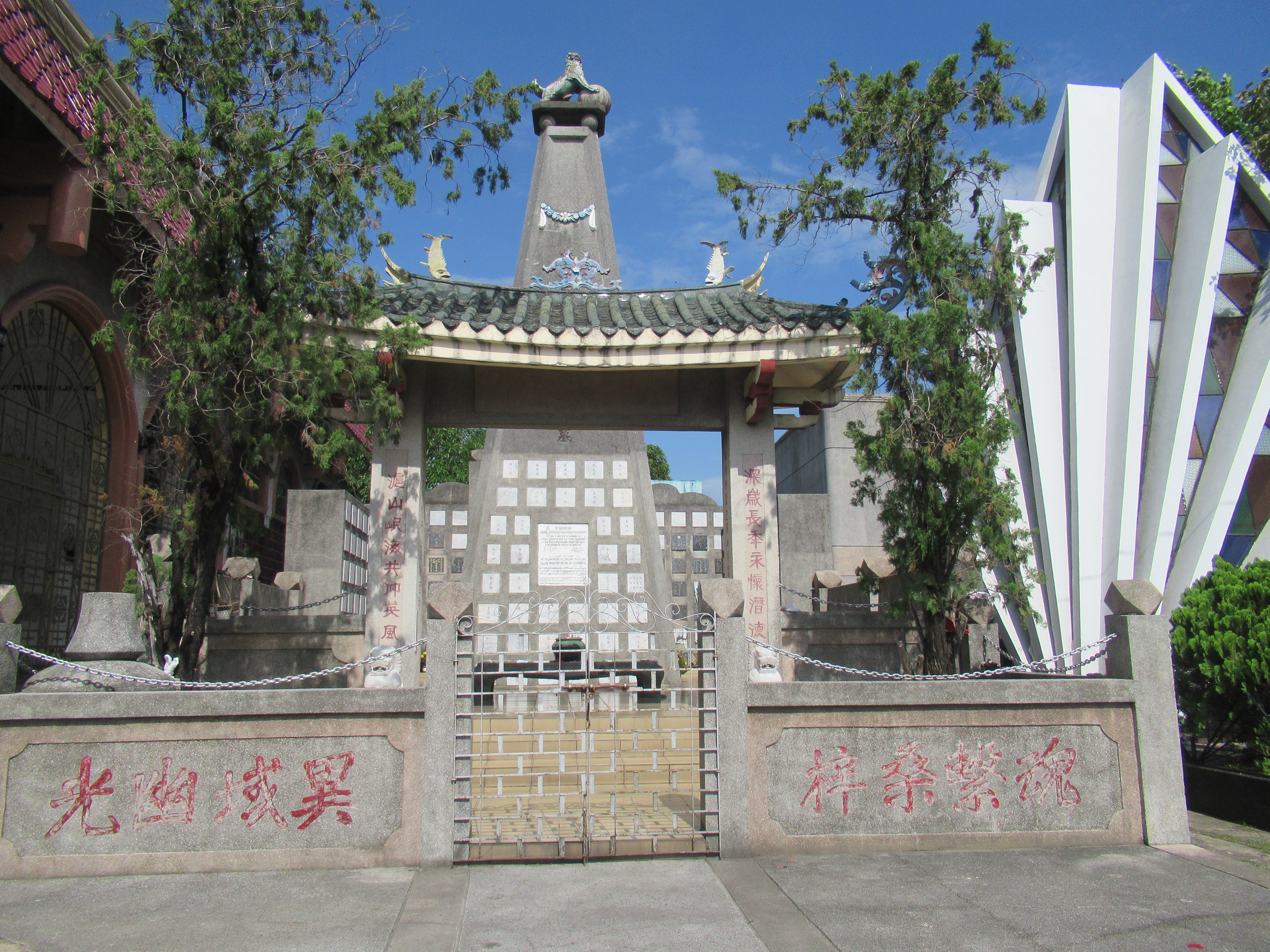
Chinese Soldiers Tomb

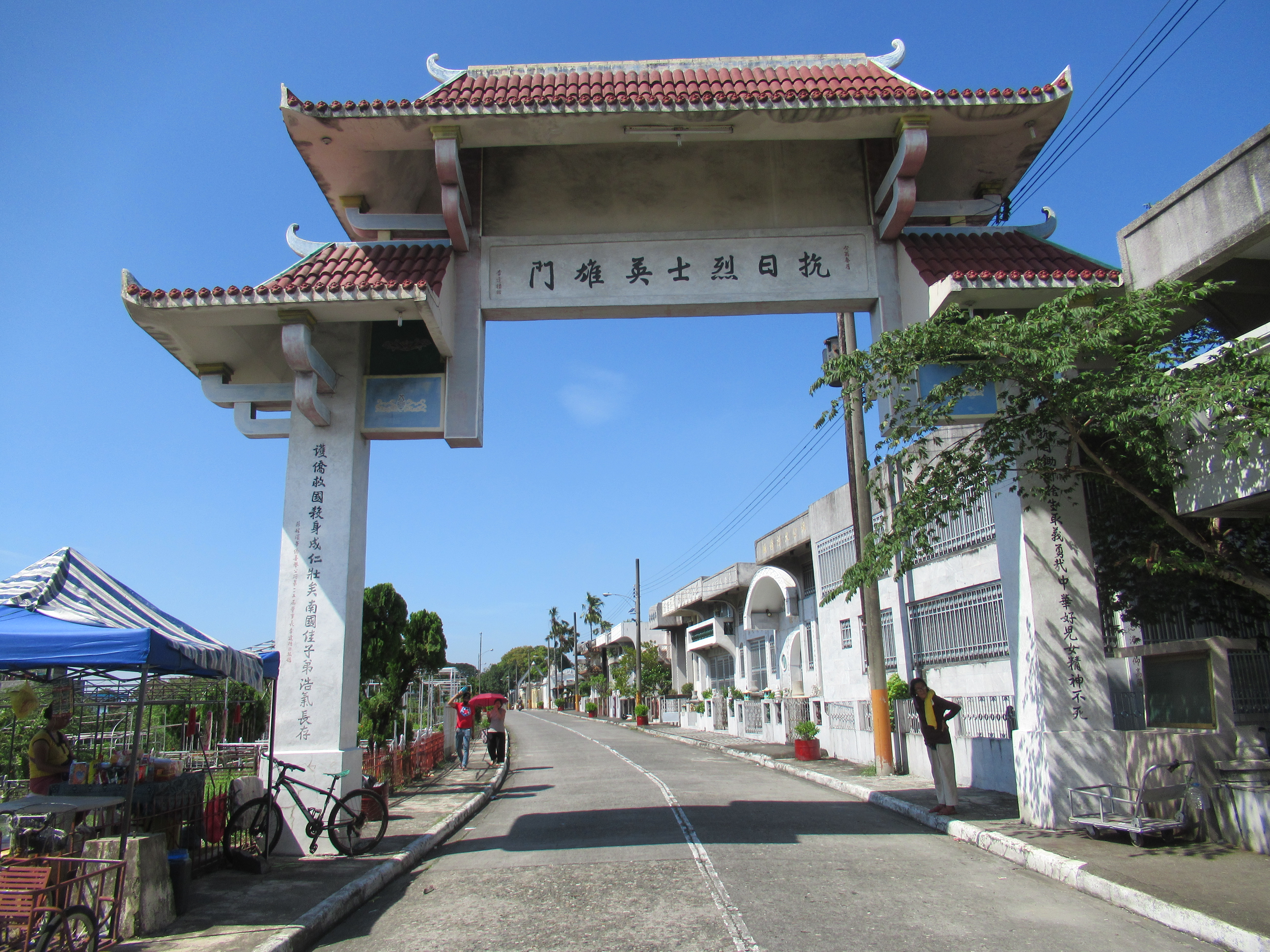
Chinese Youth Arch of Heroes

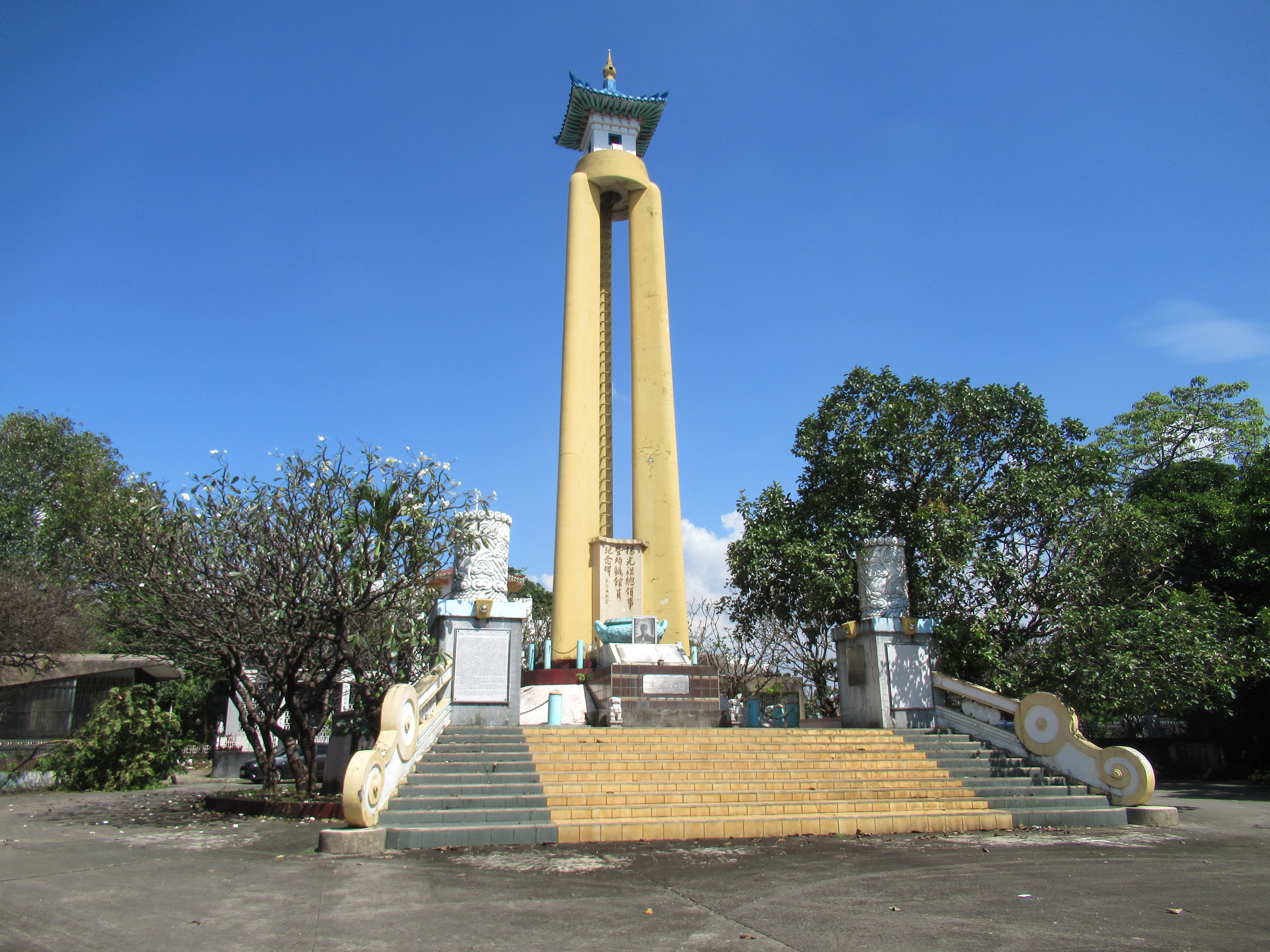
Clarence Kuangson Young Memorial

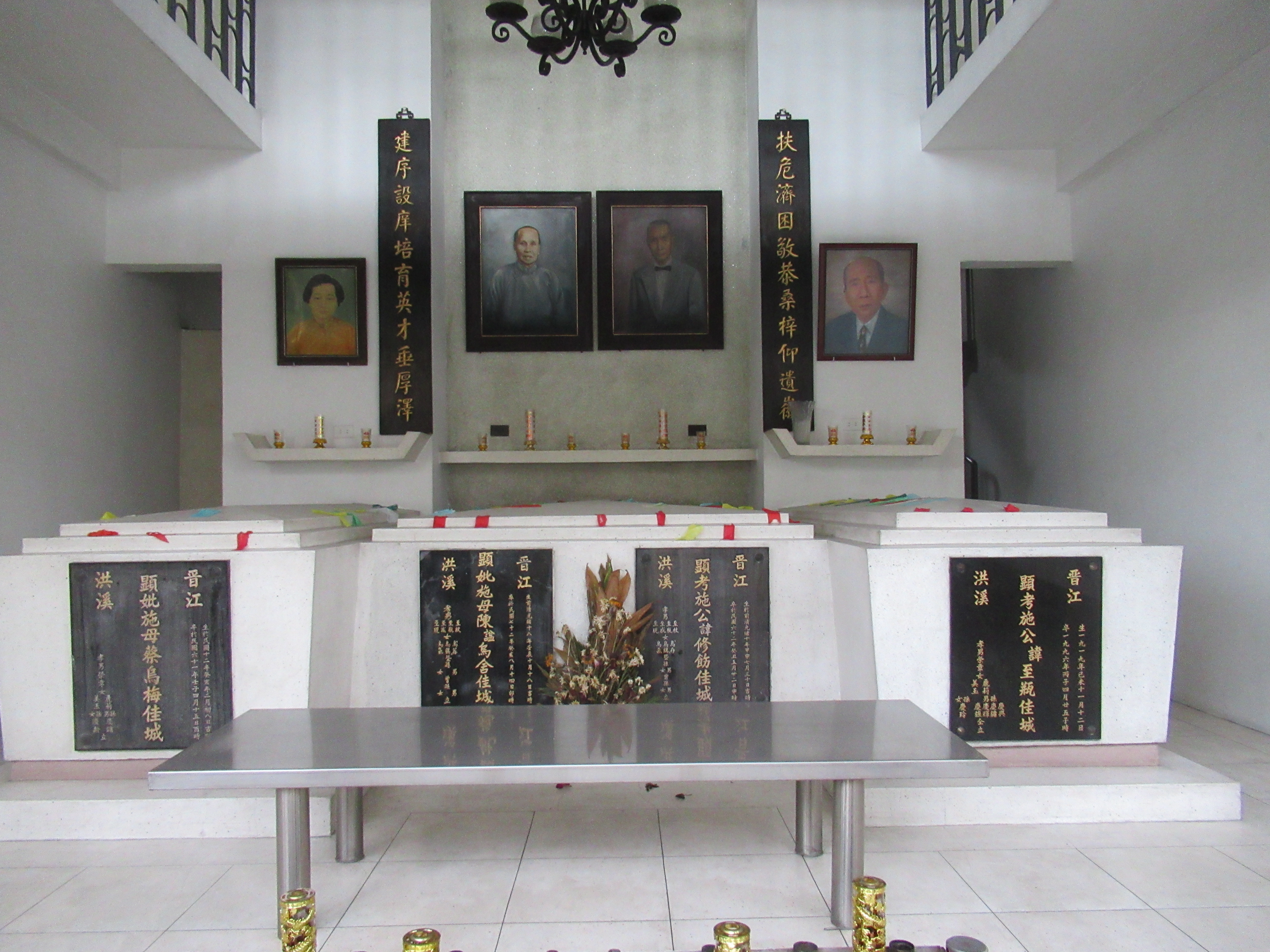
Henry H. Sy and Tan O Sia - Adrian Sy & Encarnacion Sy (Garcia) Mausoleum

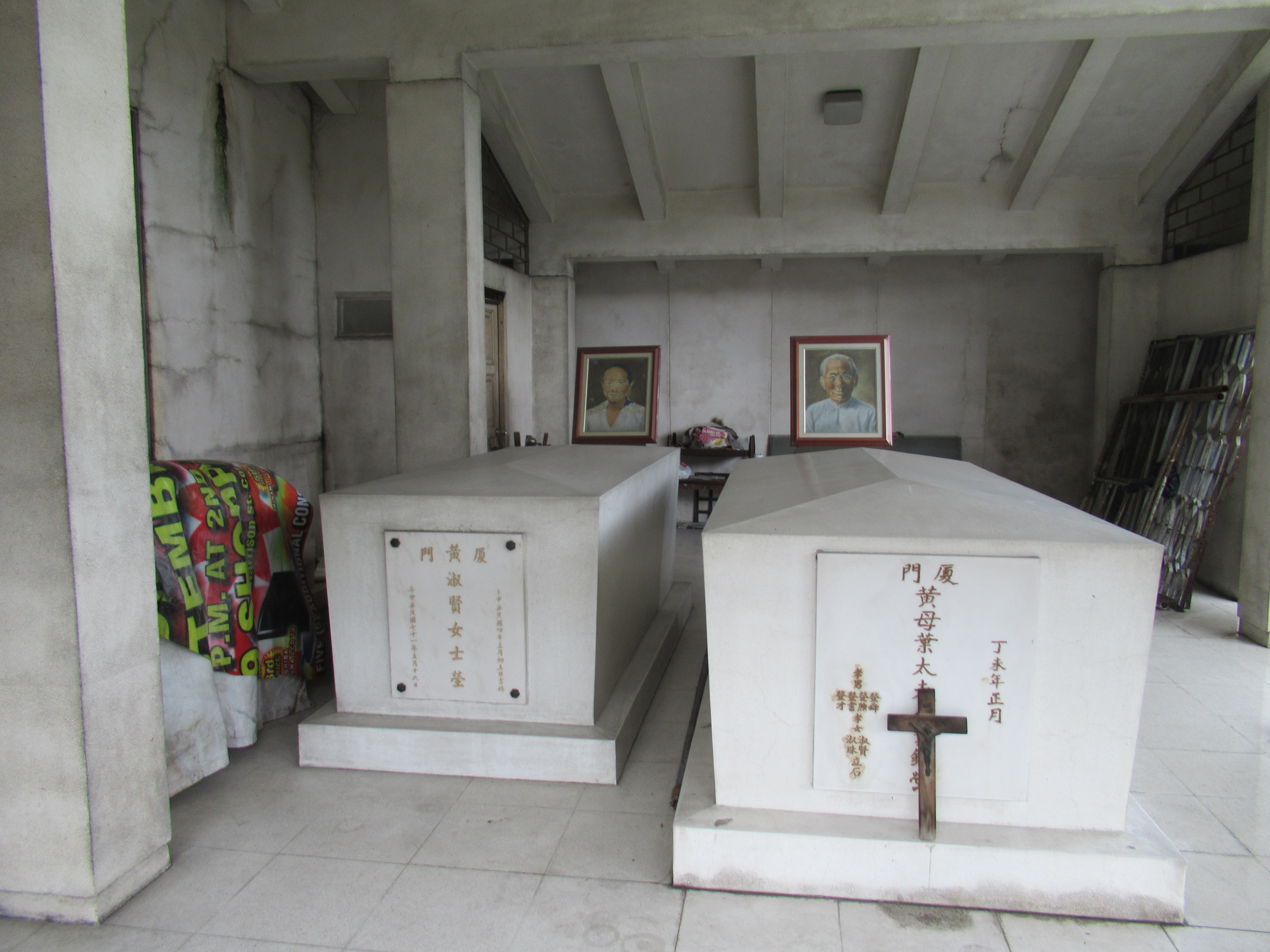
James Huang Mausoleum

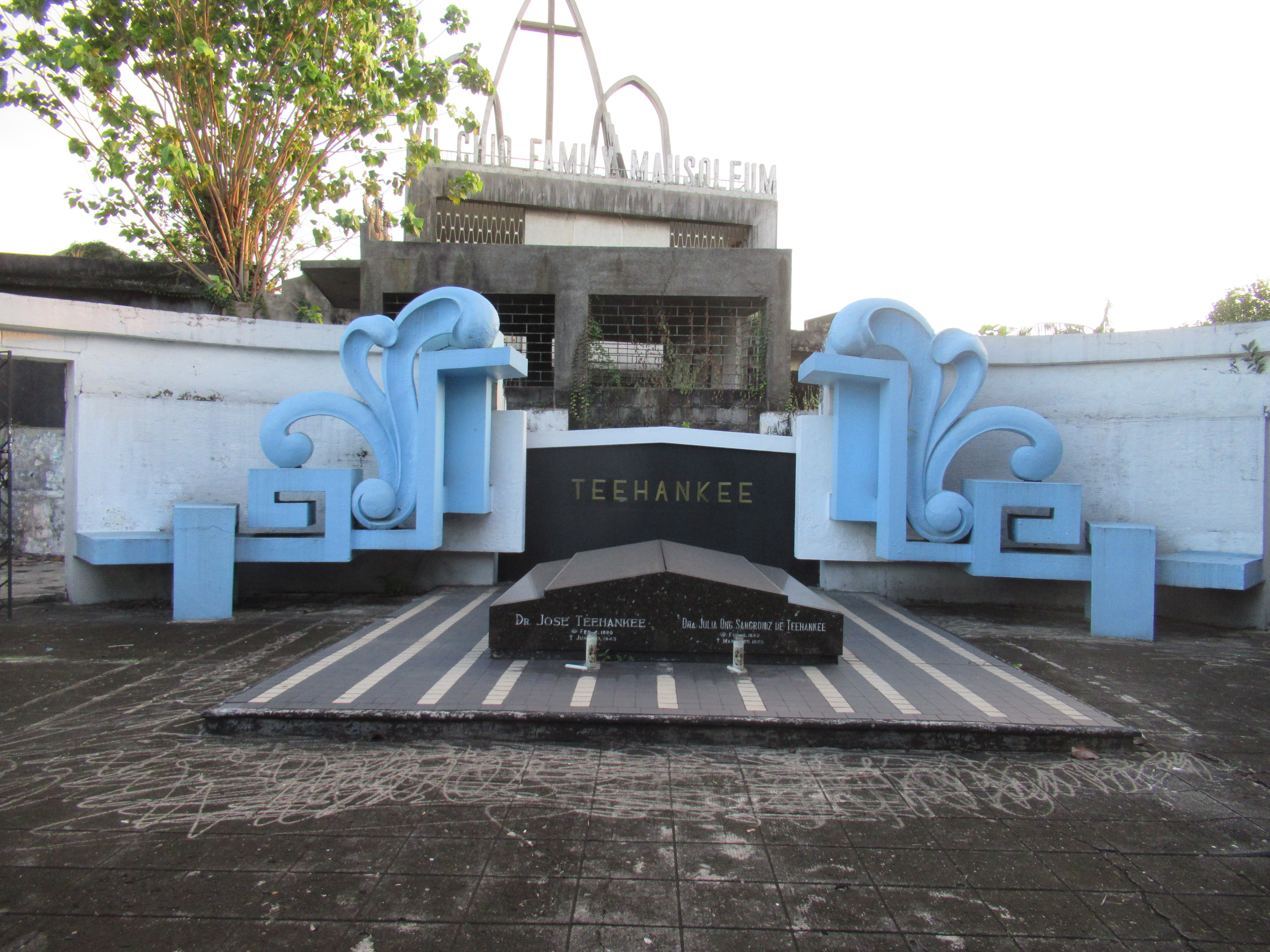
José Teehankee - Julia Ong Sangroniz Family Grave

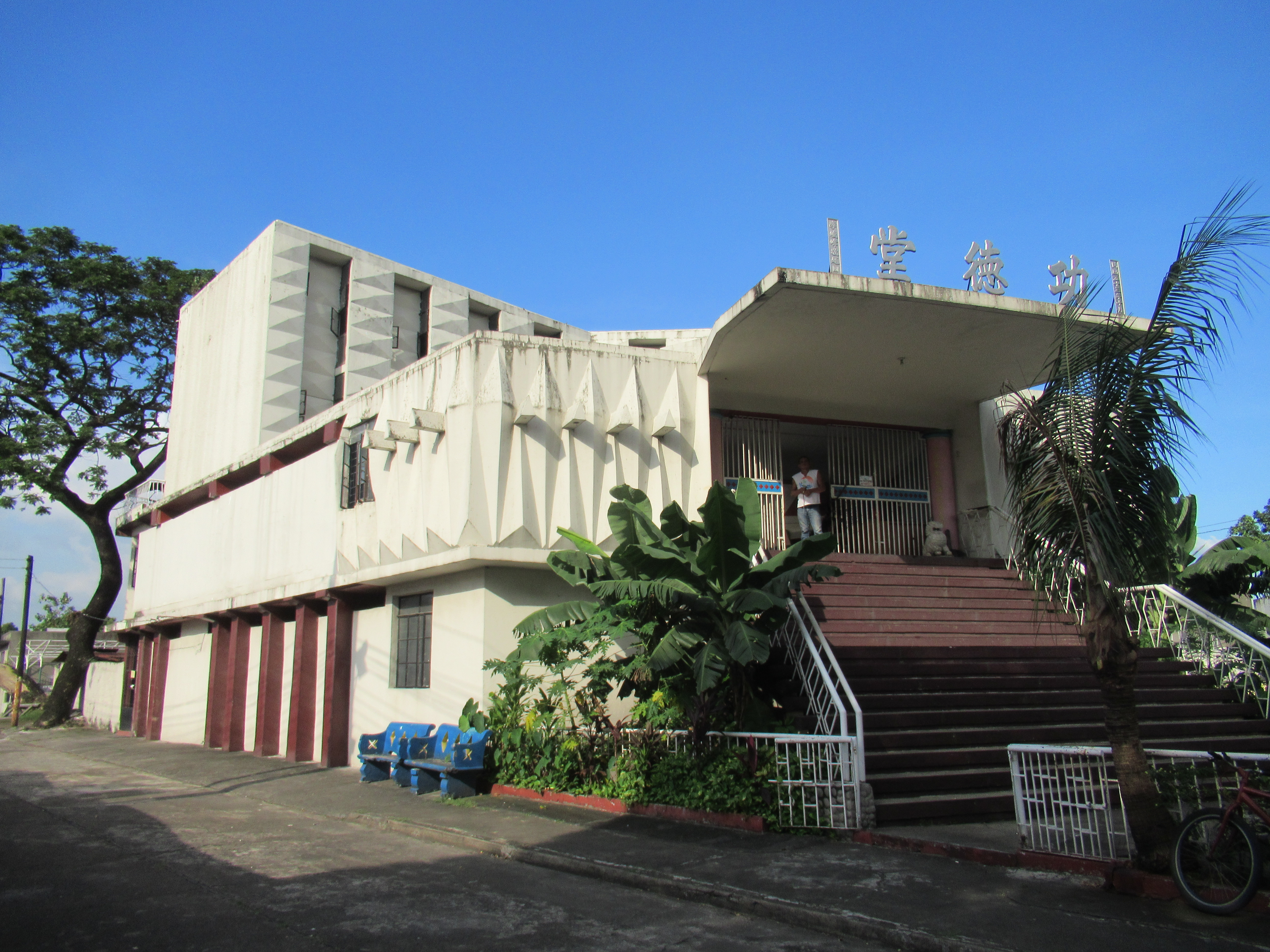
Kong Tek Tong Hall

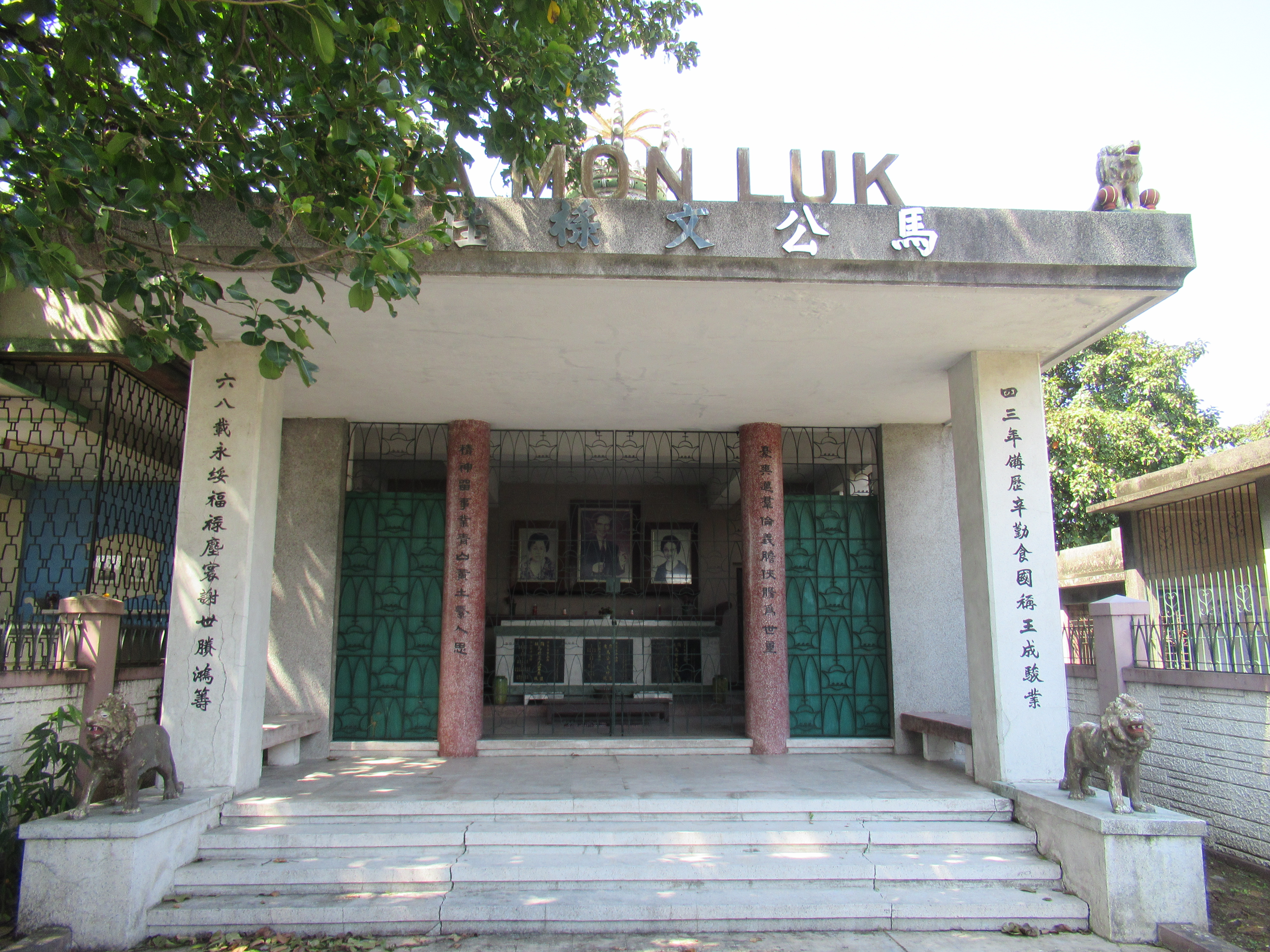
Ma Mon Luk Mausoleum

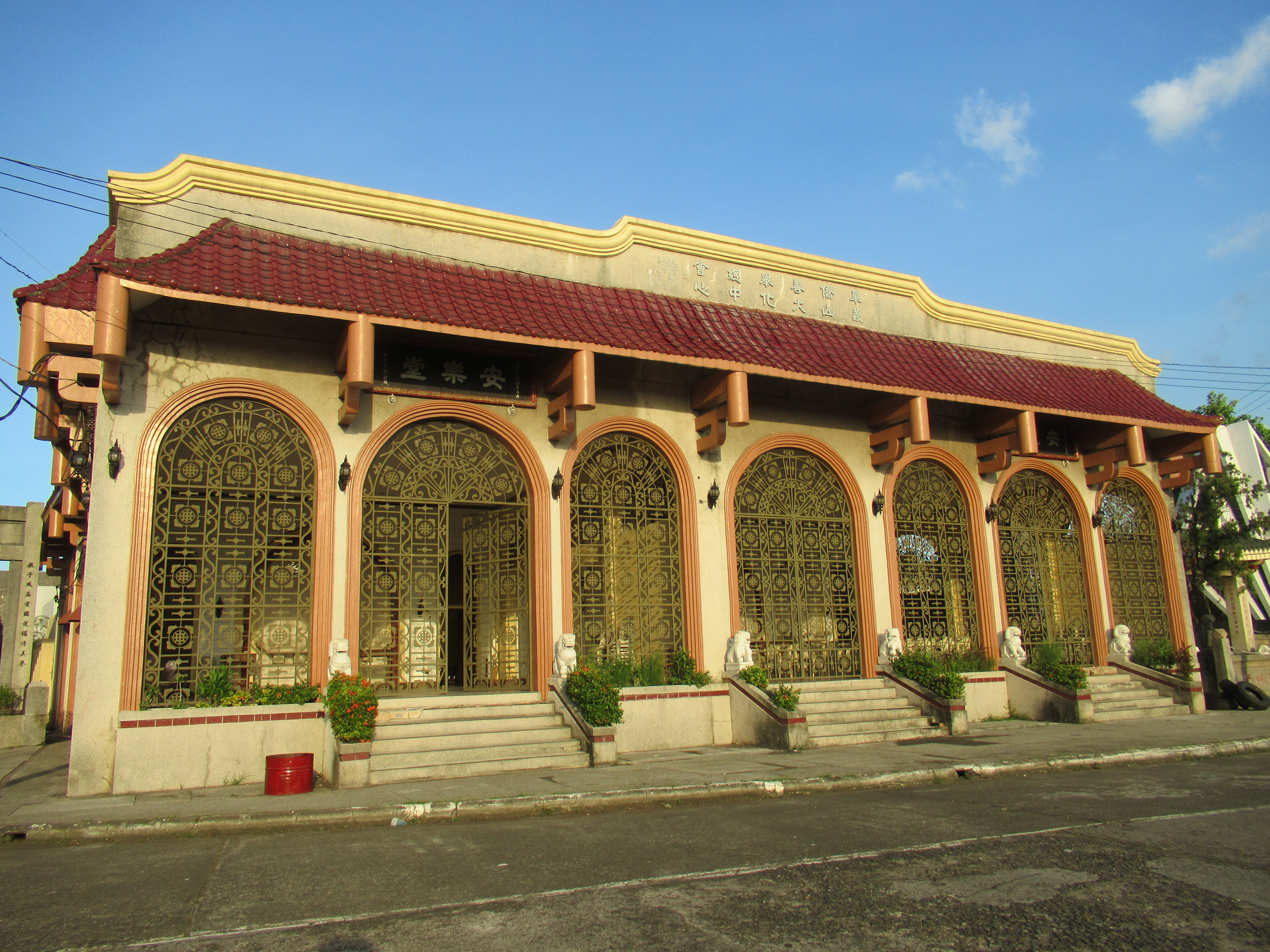
Manila Chinese Cemetery Crematorium

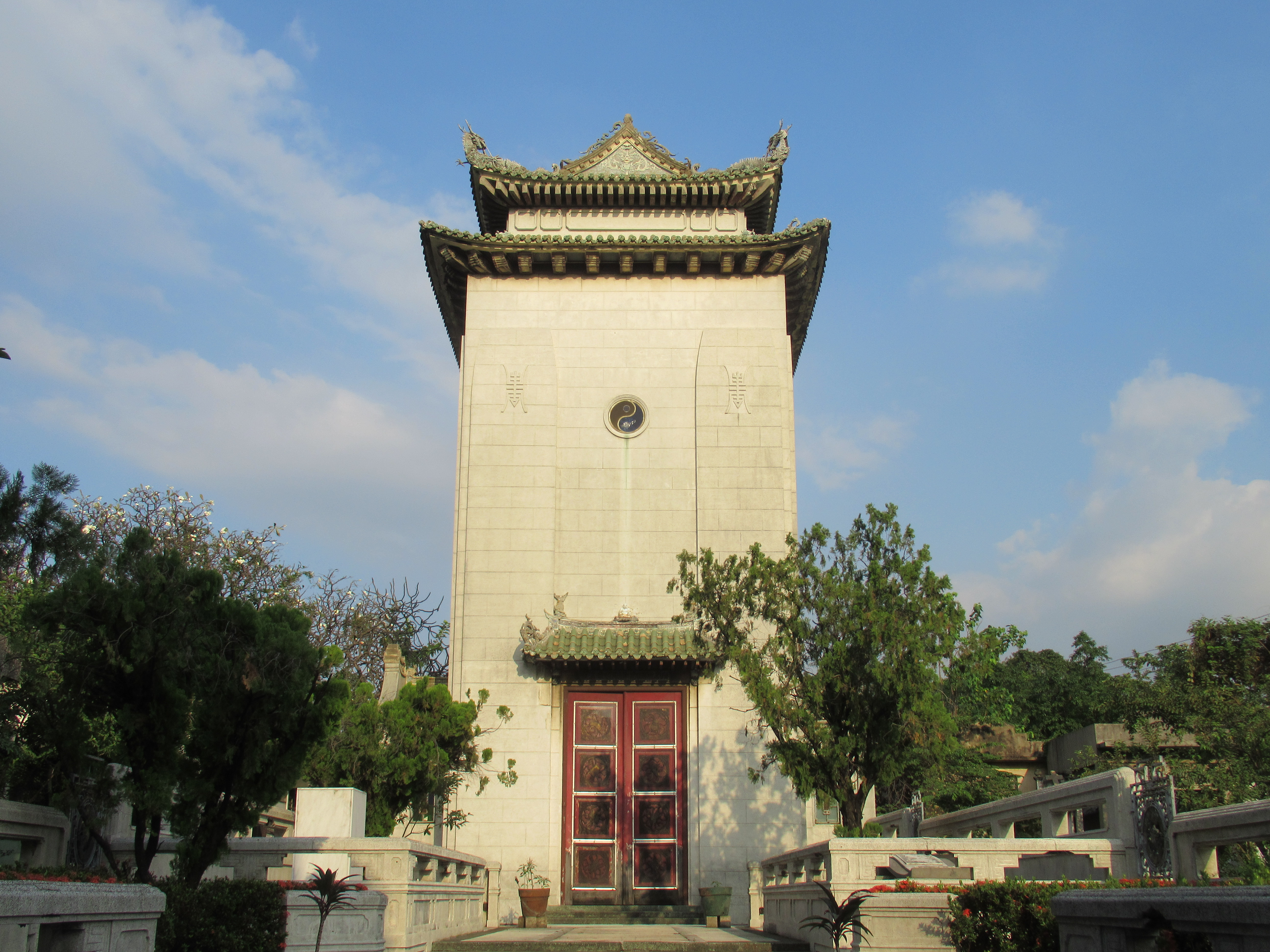
Dee C. Chuan Mausoleum

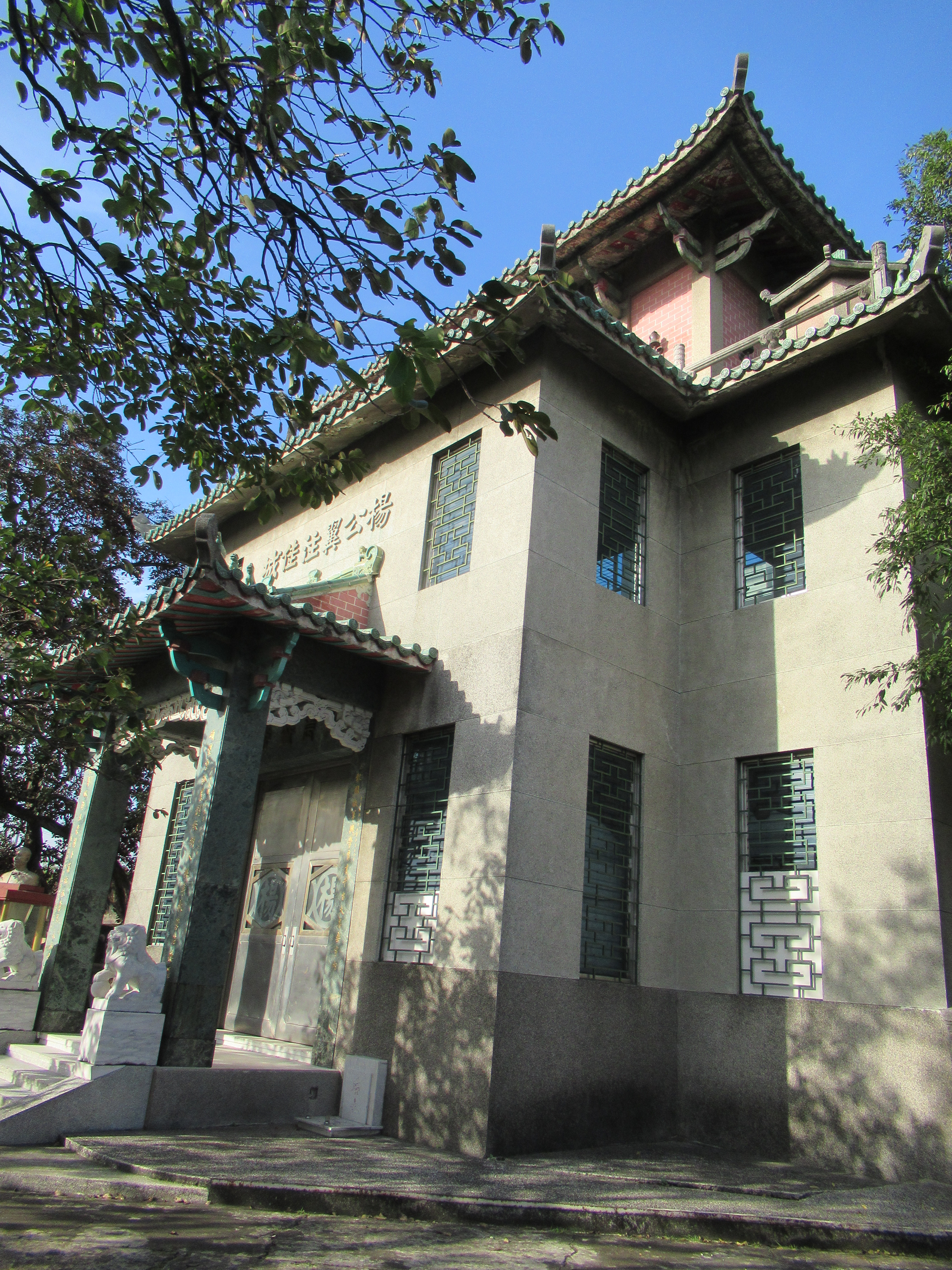
Domingo Yu Chu Mausoleum

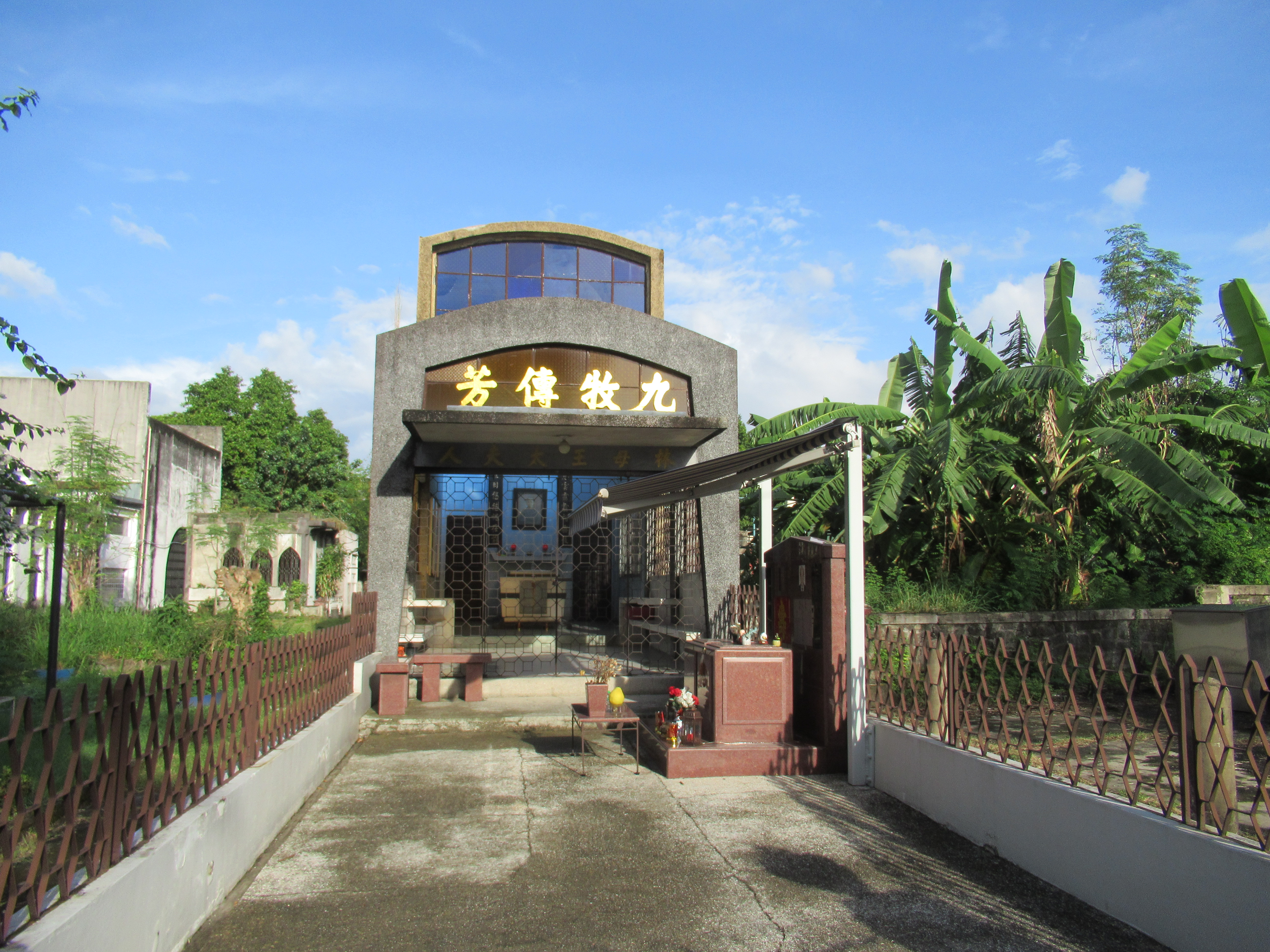
Patricio Luis Lim Mausoleum

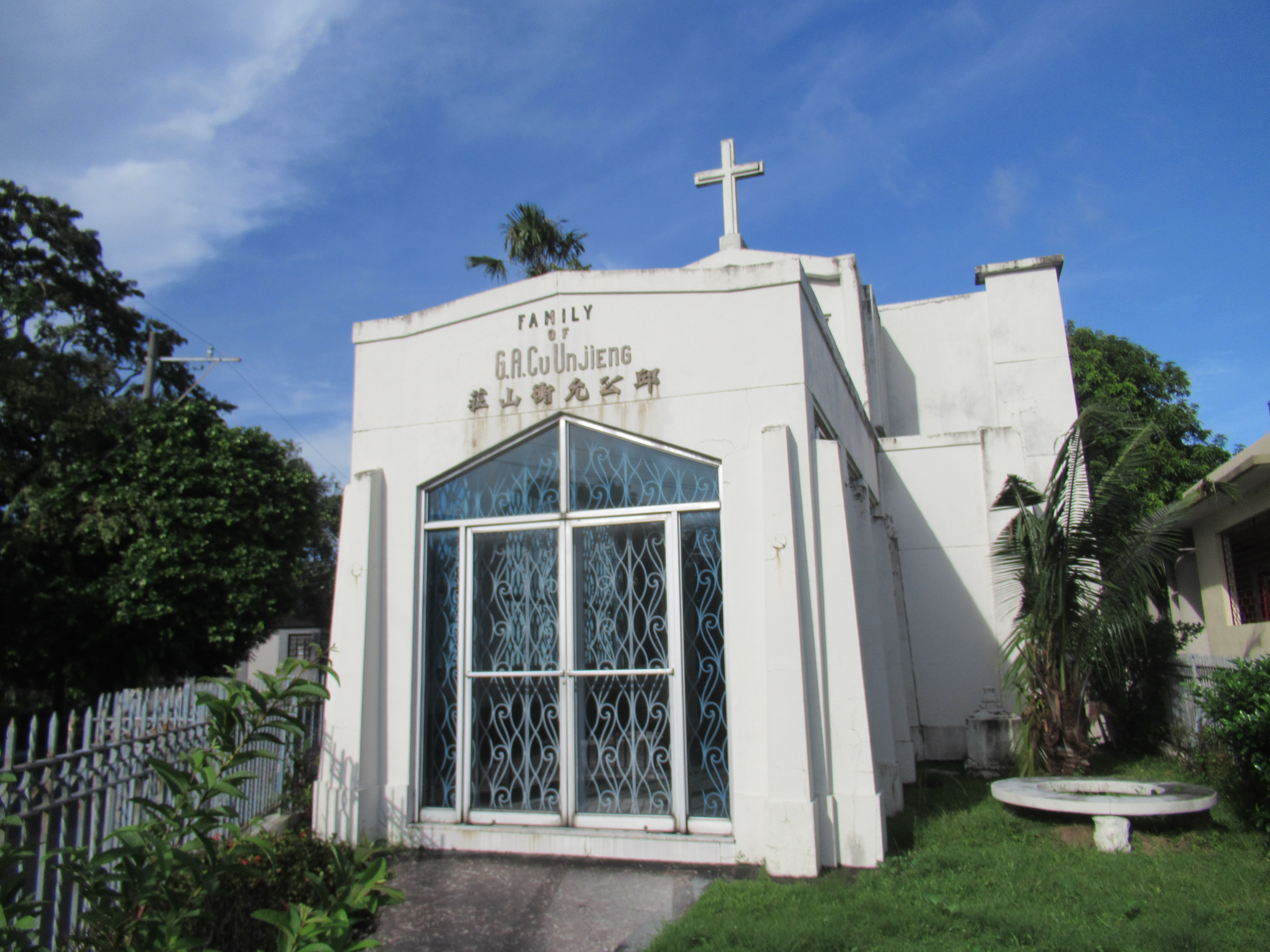
Family of G.A. Cu Unjieng Family Mausoleum

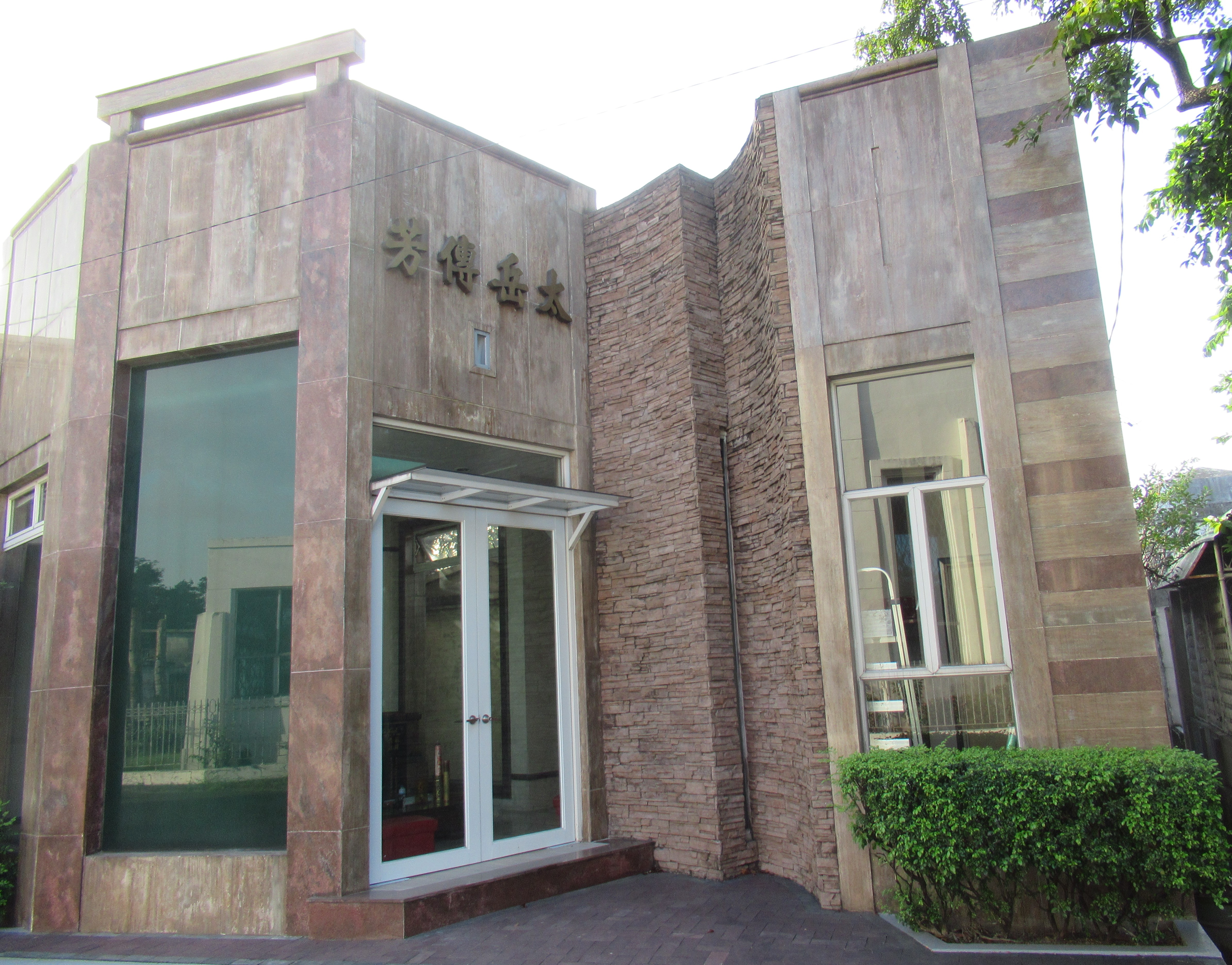
Luis Co Chi Kiat Mausoleum (of the family that founded Puregold)

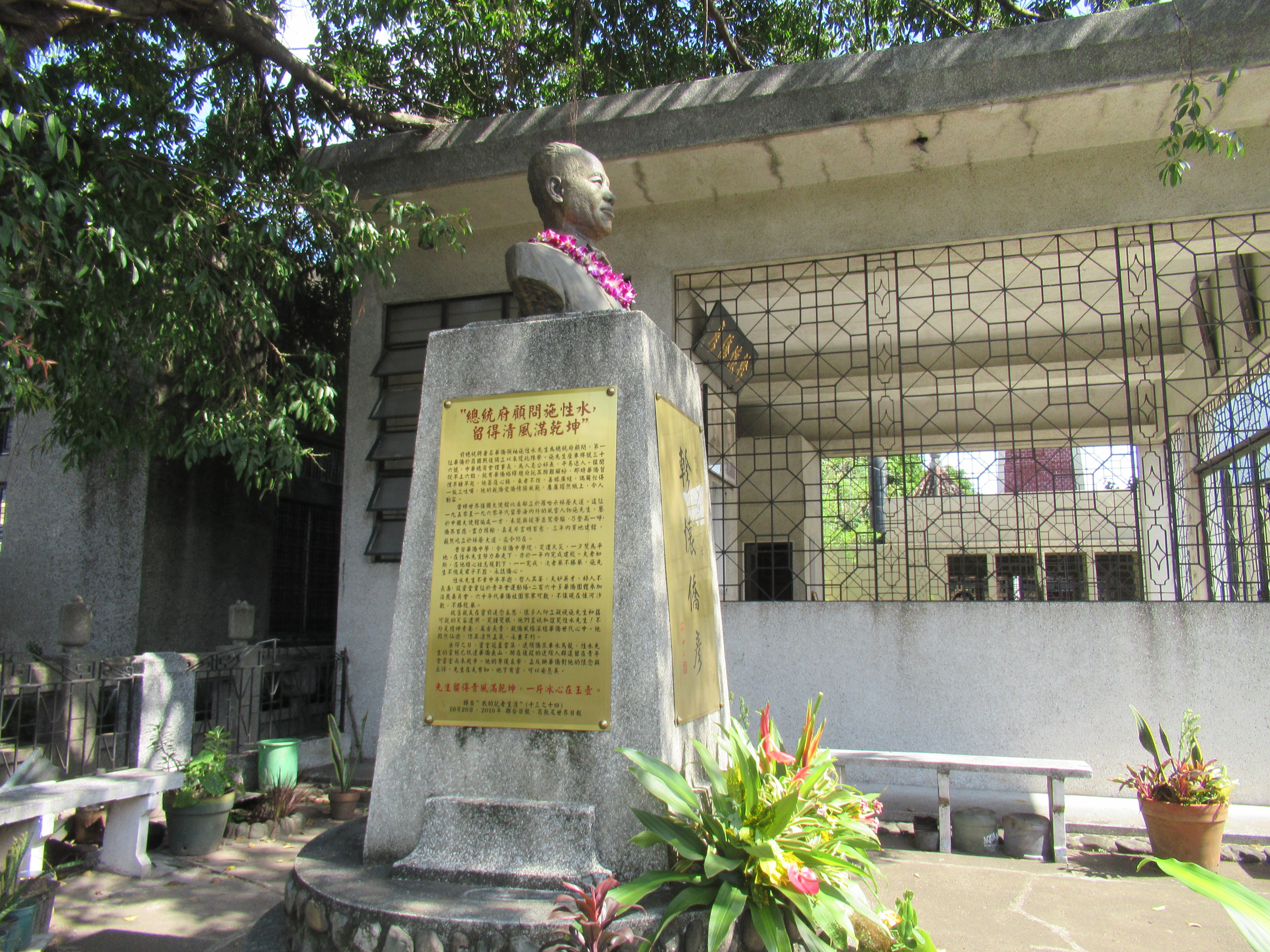
Mausoleum of Ang Ya De Sy - Sy Sieng Suy (Sy En)

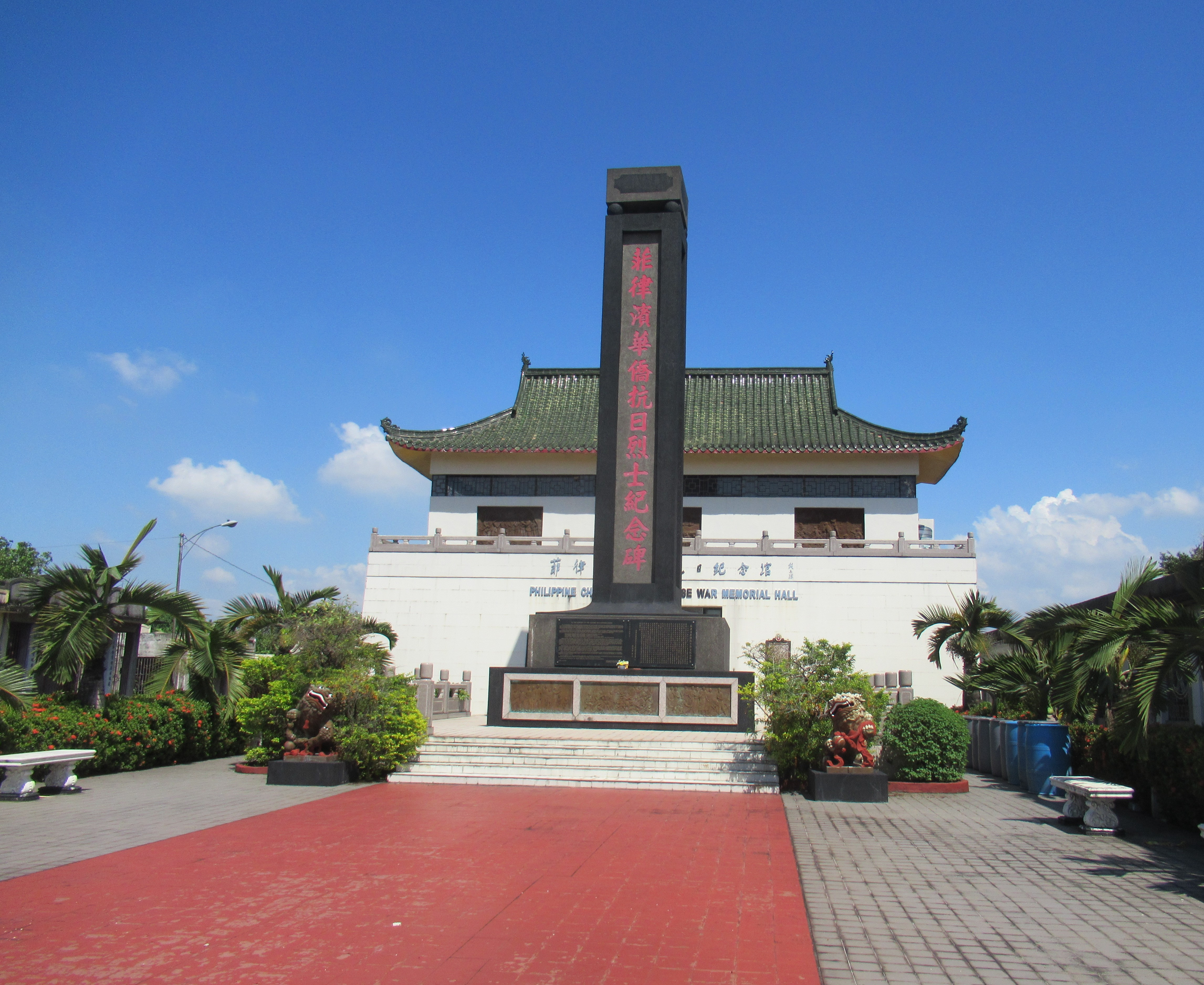
Philippine Chinese Anti-Japanese War Memorial Complex

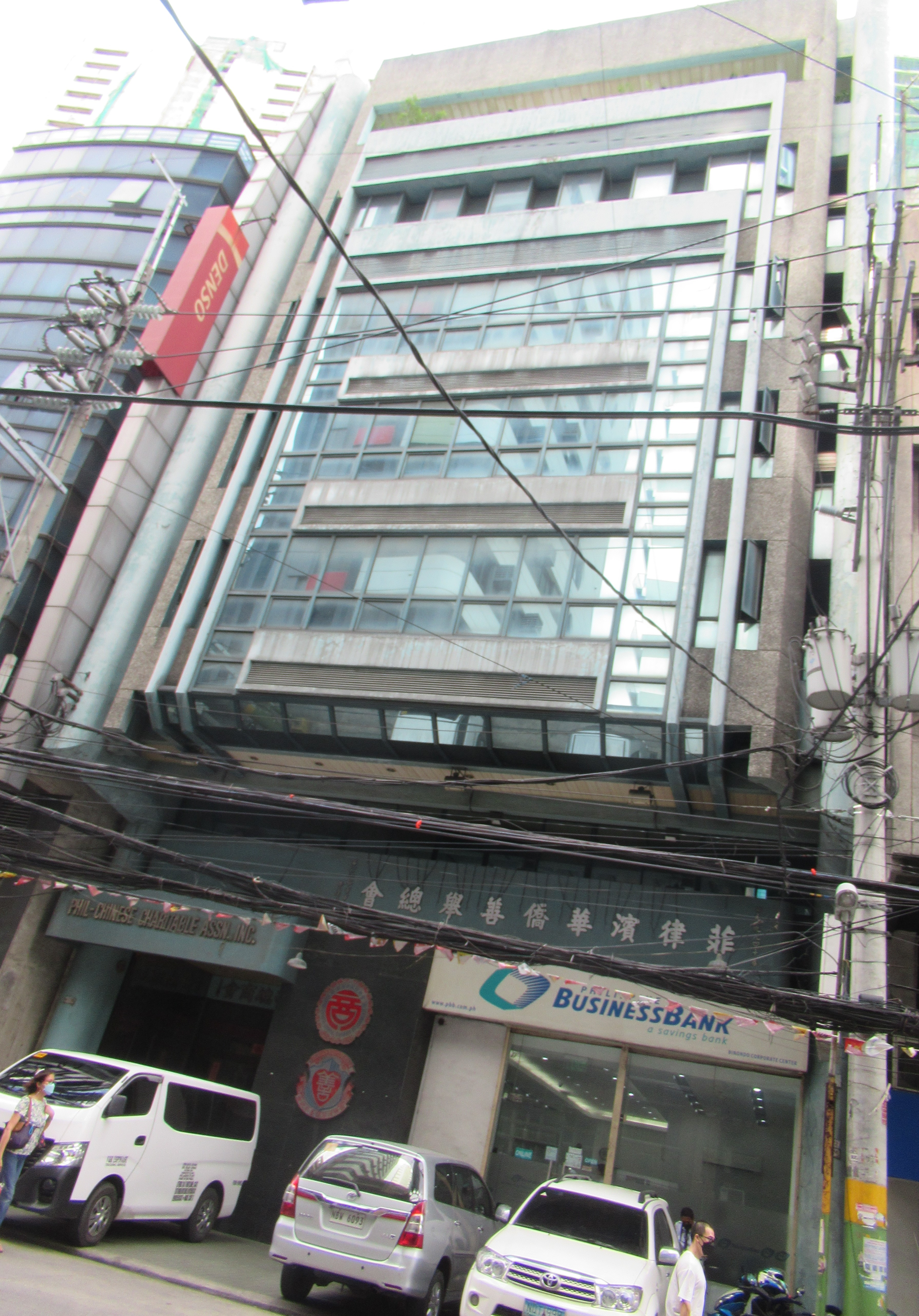
Philippine-Chinese Charitable Association, Inc.

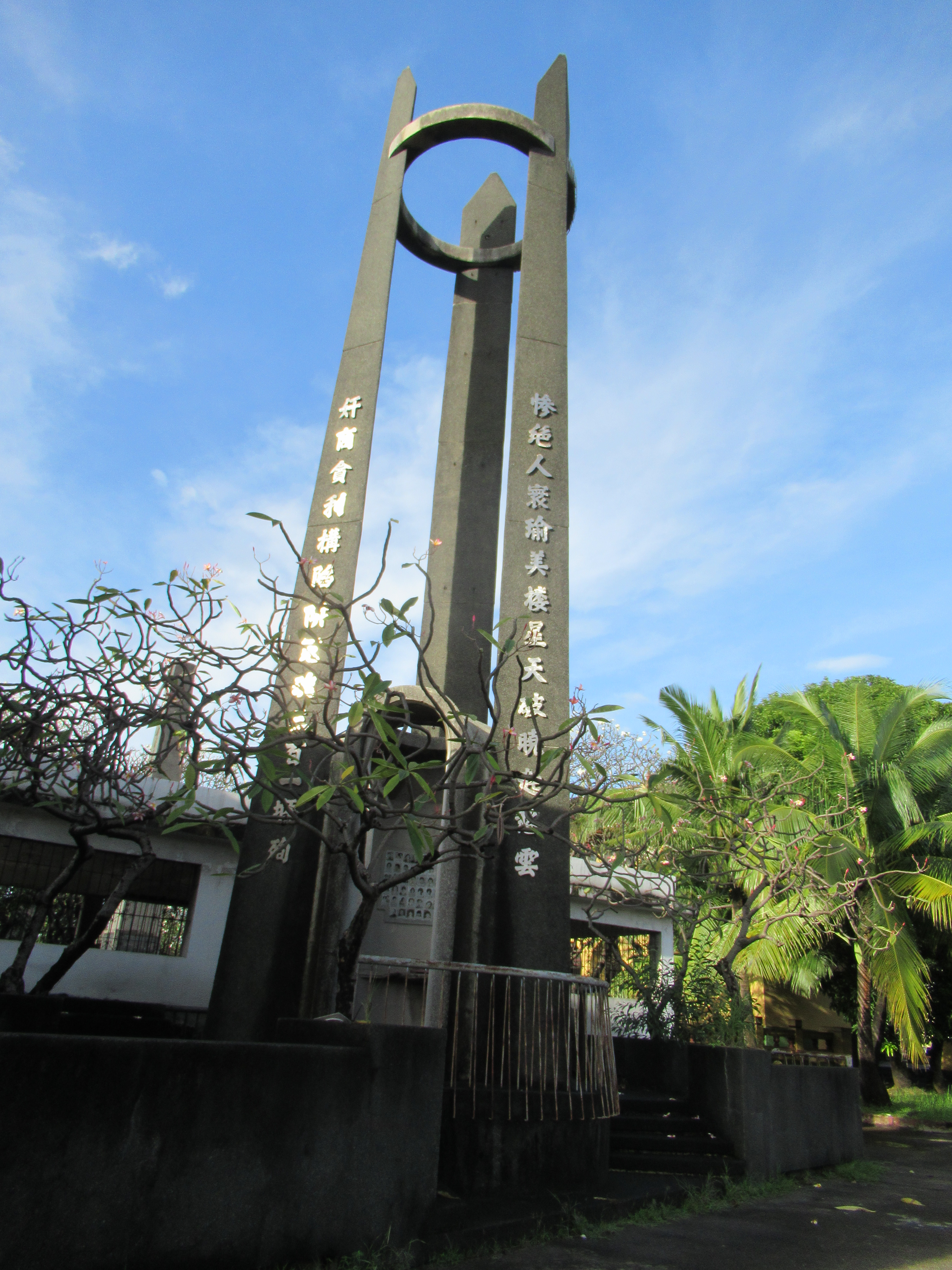
Ruby Tower Memorial

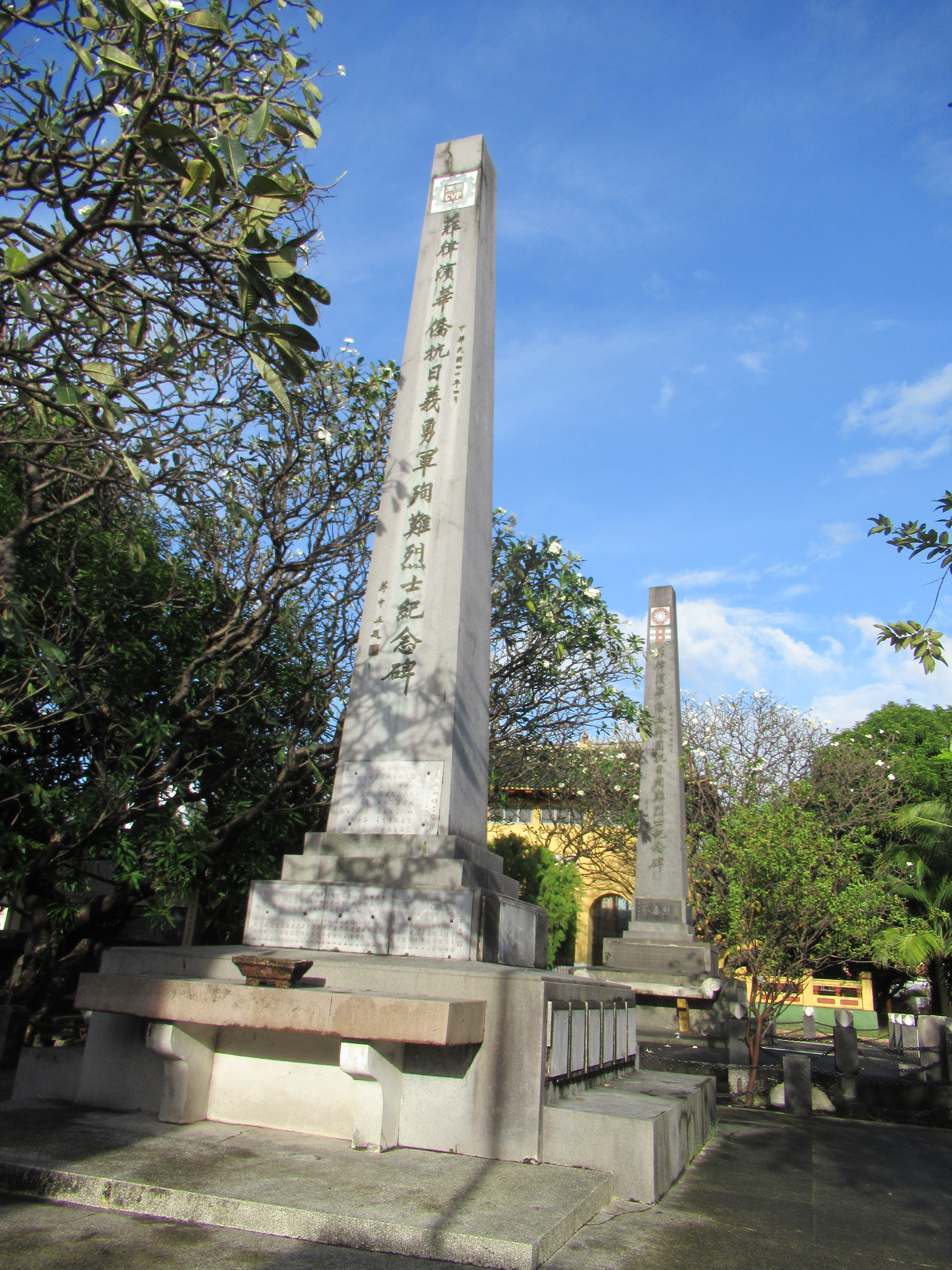
United States Chinese Volunteers in the Philippines Memorial

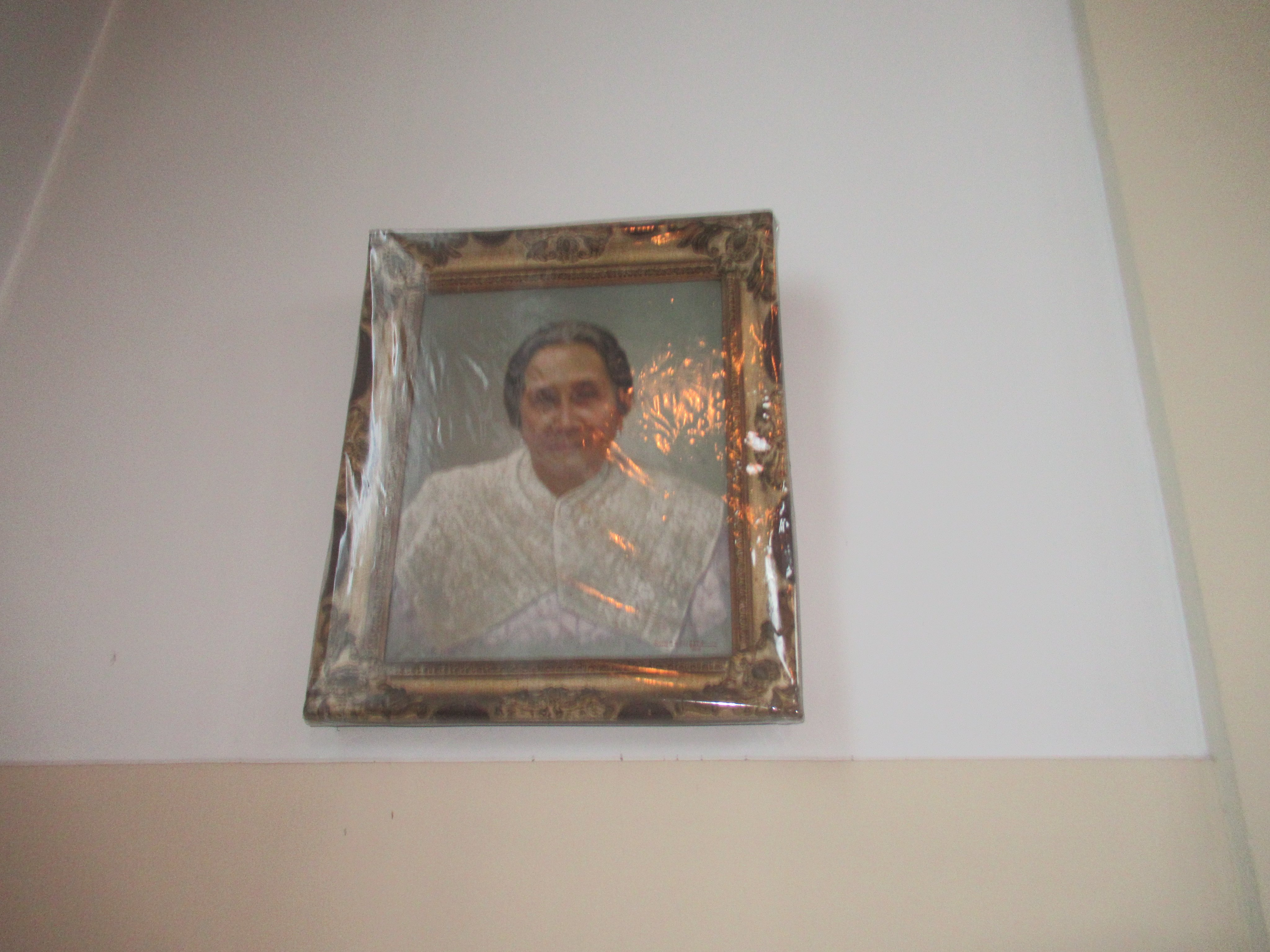
Dominga Ayala CuUnjieng, wife of Guillermo A. Cu-Unjieng, Sr. (邱允衡; Qiu Yunheng
