= Carlos Palanca =

Carlos Palanca may refer to:

- Carlos Palanca Gutiérrez (born April 24, 1819), Spanish diplomat and soldier military commander Field Marshal
- Carlos L. Palanca (born June 06, 1844) Tan Quien-Sien, Chinese diplomat and Spanish colonial government official
- Carlos T. Palanca, Sr. (born September 01, 1869) Tan Guin-Lay, founder of the La Tondeña Incorporada distillery and namesake of the Palanca Awards
