= The Good-Luck Horse =

- First edition
- Author: Chih-Yi
- Illustrator: Plato Chan
- Cover artist: Chan
- Language: English
- Genre: Children's picture book
- Publisher: Whittlesey House
- Publication date: 1943
- Publication place: United States

The Good-Luck Horse is a children's picture book illustrated by Plato Chan, adapted from a folk tale by his mother Chih-yi Chan. Plato Chan was the son of a Chinese diplomat and a child prodigy; he was twelve when he illustrated the book. The Good-Luck Horse was published by Whittlesey House in 1943. It was a 1944 Caldecott Medal honoree. This story has adventures of a horse that a boy had made out of paper and then changed into a real horse by a magician. He was named the good-luck horse because his fortunes fell and rose. Plato Chan (March 14, 1930 – January 18, 2006) and wife Anne Chu Chan (September 17, 1928 – October 28, 2010) are buried at the Family of G.A. Cu Unjieng Mausoleum Manila Chinese Cemetery.

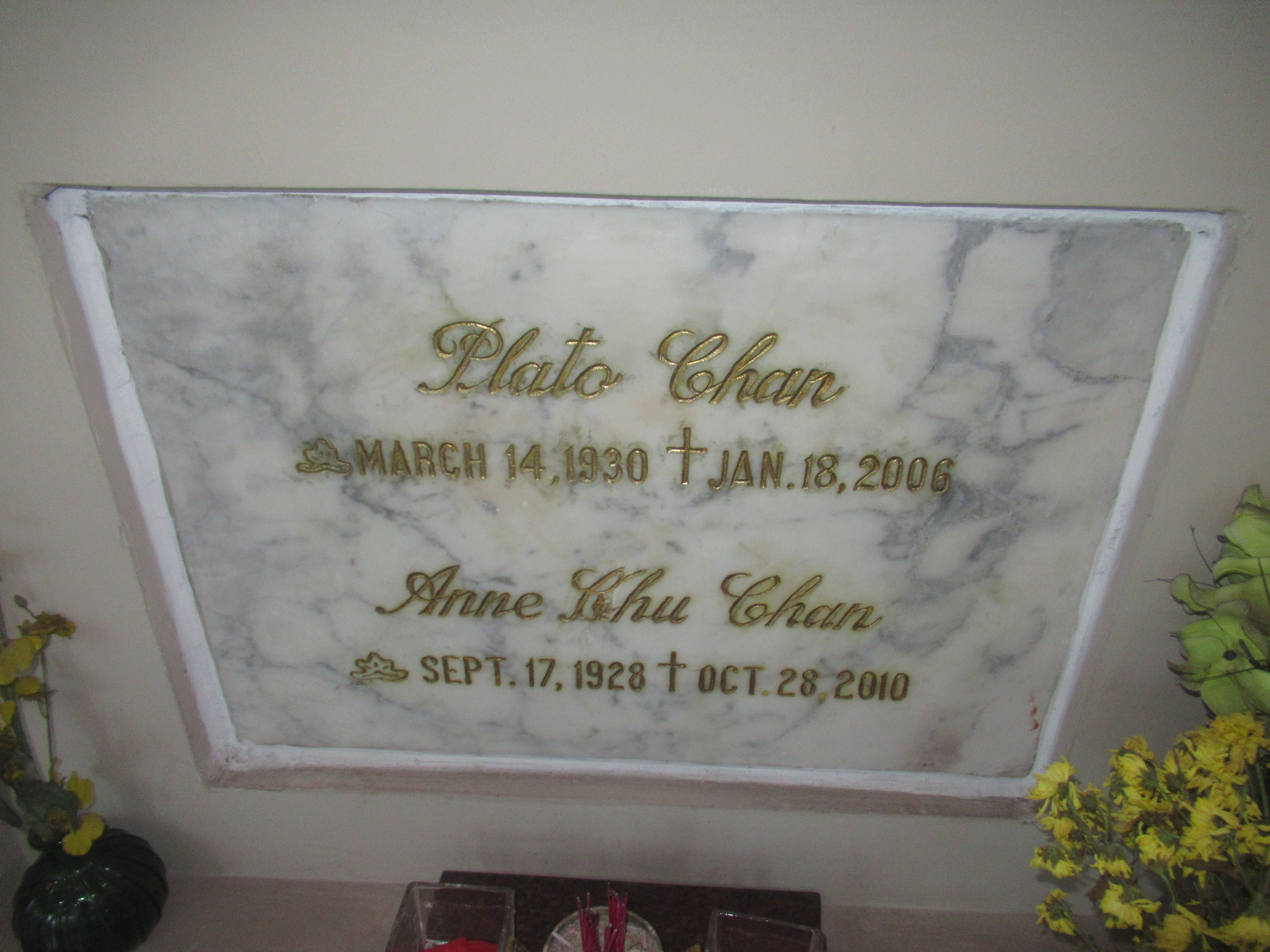
Plato Chan (Family of G.A. Cu Unjieng Mausoleum, Manila Chinese Cemetery)

== Plot ==
The Good-Luck Horse is based on a Chinese folk-tale. It tells the story of a paper horse that was created by a kind magician. Since the horse was magical it was able to do anything it was told to do. The horse then became a problem because it was bringing bad luck to its owner until the horse ran away. When a war broke out the horse met another horse and together they were able to end the war, earning him the name of the good-luck horse.

== See also ==
- The old man lost his horse, the original story
