= Ruby Tower =

Former building in Manila, Philippines

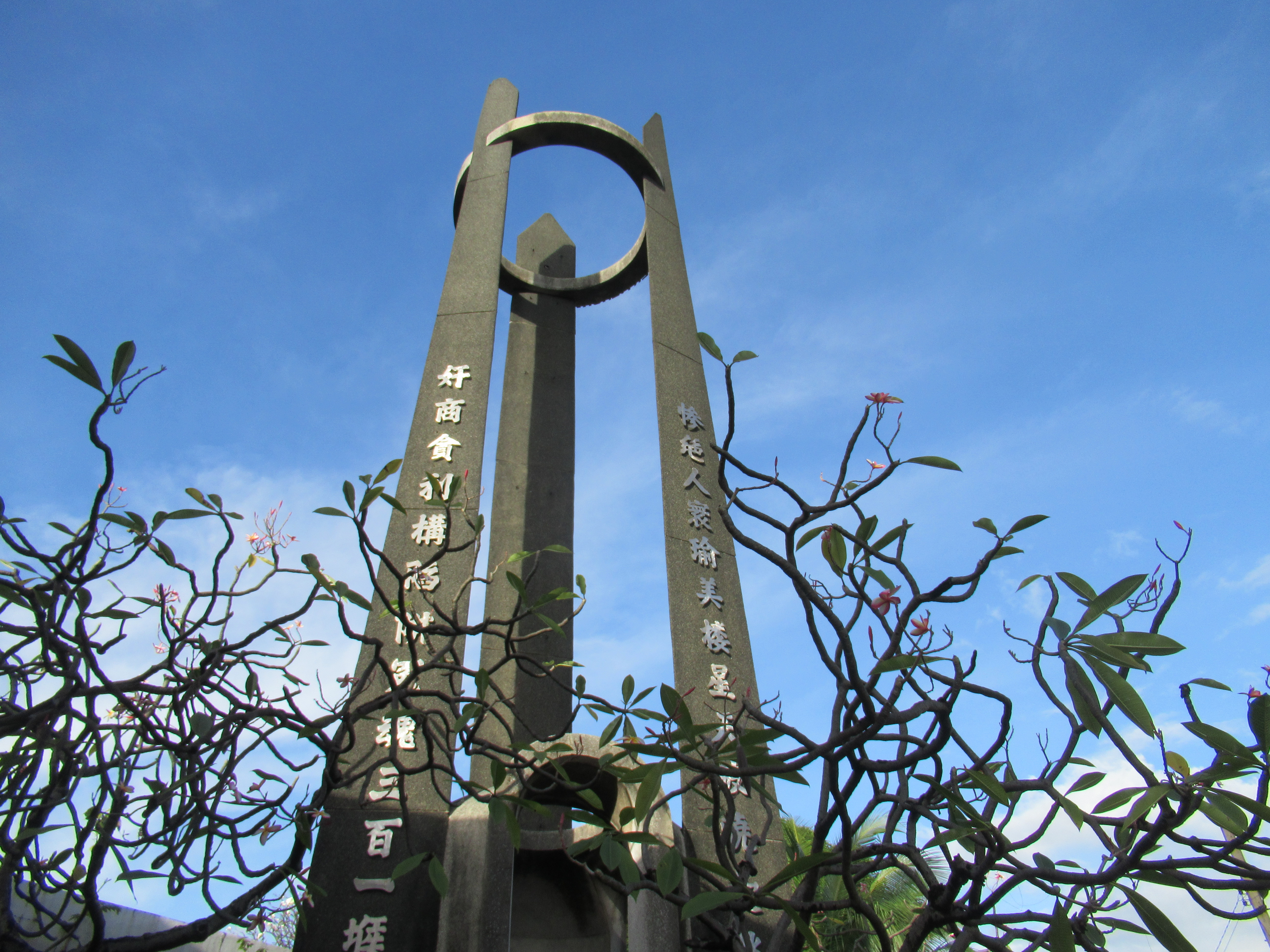
- Interactive map of the Ruby Tower area

General information
- Type: Commercial/residential
- Location: Doroteo Jose and Teodora Alonso Streets, Santa Cruz, Manila, Philippines
- Coordinates: 14°36′20″N 120°58′47″E
- Completed: 1965–1967
- Destroyed: August 2, 1968

Height
- Height: 20.5 m (67 ft)

Dimensions
- Other dimensions: 45.5 m × 30 m (149 ft × 98 ft)

Technical details
- Floor count: 6

Design and construction
- Known for: Collapse in 1968 Casiguran earthquake

The Ruby Tower was a six-story building in Manila, Philippines, completed c. 1965 (Note: one source says it was built three years before the collapse and one says one year) that collapsed on August 2, 1968, during the Casiguran earthquake killing over 250 people.

== Background ==
The building, constructed at a cost of $250,000, was located on the corner of Doroteo Jose and Teodora Alonso Streets in Santa Cruz, a district in the northern part of Manila. The reinforced-concrete building measured 45.5 m × 30 m (149 ft × 98 ft), with a height of 20.5 m (67 ft). It was of a slab-and-beam design supported by columns, the rear wall with the primary resistance to shear or torsional forces. The mixed commercial and residential building contained 38 commercial spaces on the lower two floors and 76 residential units on the upper four floors. It housed 600 to 1,000 people.

== Collapse and rescue effort ==
The 7.3-magnitude 1968 Casiguran earthquake, centered more than 200 km (120 mi) away, hit at 4:19 am and caused the building to collapse in a pancake fashion burying over 500 people. A volunteer force of over 6,000 mobilized to free the victims trapped in the rubble, as there was no government disaster plan in place at the time. Many people were rescued alive, including about 30 who later died from their injuries. At least 260 people were injured. (Note: or over 300) The rescue effort turned to recovery and lasted over a week. Not all of the bodies were identified.

A part of the northern end of the floors one and two remained standing. The lower levels collapsed straight downward, while the upper floors shifted south as they collapsed, with the roof shifting 30 feet (9.1 m) south and 10 feet (3.0 m) east of its original location. Its long columns buckled in the earthquake.

By August 4, Philippine soldiers and heavy construction equipment were in use. They were assisted for 10 days by personnel of the United States military. In 80% of the building, the collapsed floors were separated by debris (portions of columns and walls) leaving spaces of 3 feet (0.91 m) or less, with very limited lateral movement. As a result, many holes had to be cut through the concrete with jackhammers and oxygen-acetylene torches to reach the pockets. Philippine and US military, and civilian contractors all participated in this work.

Around 3,000 rescuers, including soldiers and civilians, worked daily, all coordinated by Brigadier General Gaudencio Tobias of the Philippine Army. The nearby Cayetano Arellano High School (formerly Manila North High School) was used as a command center, canteen and rest area, medical clinic and morgue. The US effort was directed by Rear Admiral Draper Kauffman and included US Navy and US Marine Corps personnel from Subic Bay Naval Complex and US Army and US Air Force personnel from Clark Air Force Base.

The Boy Scouts of the Philippines managed the collection and identification of items of value as they were retrieved. The last of the 268 survivors pulled from the building were two girls, aged 9 and 12, who were found on August 9, having survived in the wreckage for 125 hours. Another 260 bodies were retrieved. (Note: Other reports say at least 300 were killed or 322)

The deaths in the collapse accounted for the majority of all deaths in the earthquake, causing the Casiguran earthquake to be alternatively called the Ruby Tower earthquake.

== Analysis and legacy ==
The collapse was attributed to the design, poor workmanship and concrete quality. Court cases were brought alleging both civil and criminal liability. A case against the construction company was brought before the Supreme Court, where the company was found liable for poor construction including insufficient reinforcement in columns, and joints not built to specifications.

After the collapse of Ruby Tower, the Philippines created the National Committee on Disaster Operation (NCDO), predecessor of the National Disaster Risk Reduction and Management Council (NDRRMC), setting minimum standards for building construction. The first national building code was established in 1972 by the Republic Act 6541, An Act to Ordain and Institute a National Building Code of the Philippines. Five years later, it became the National Building Code of the Philippines by order of then President Ferdinand Marcos Sr. (Note: Presidential Decree No. 1096 also allowed the code to be updated without new legislation.)

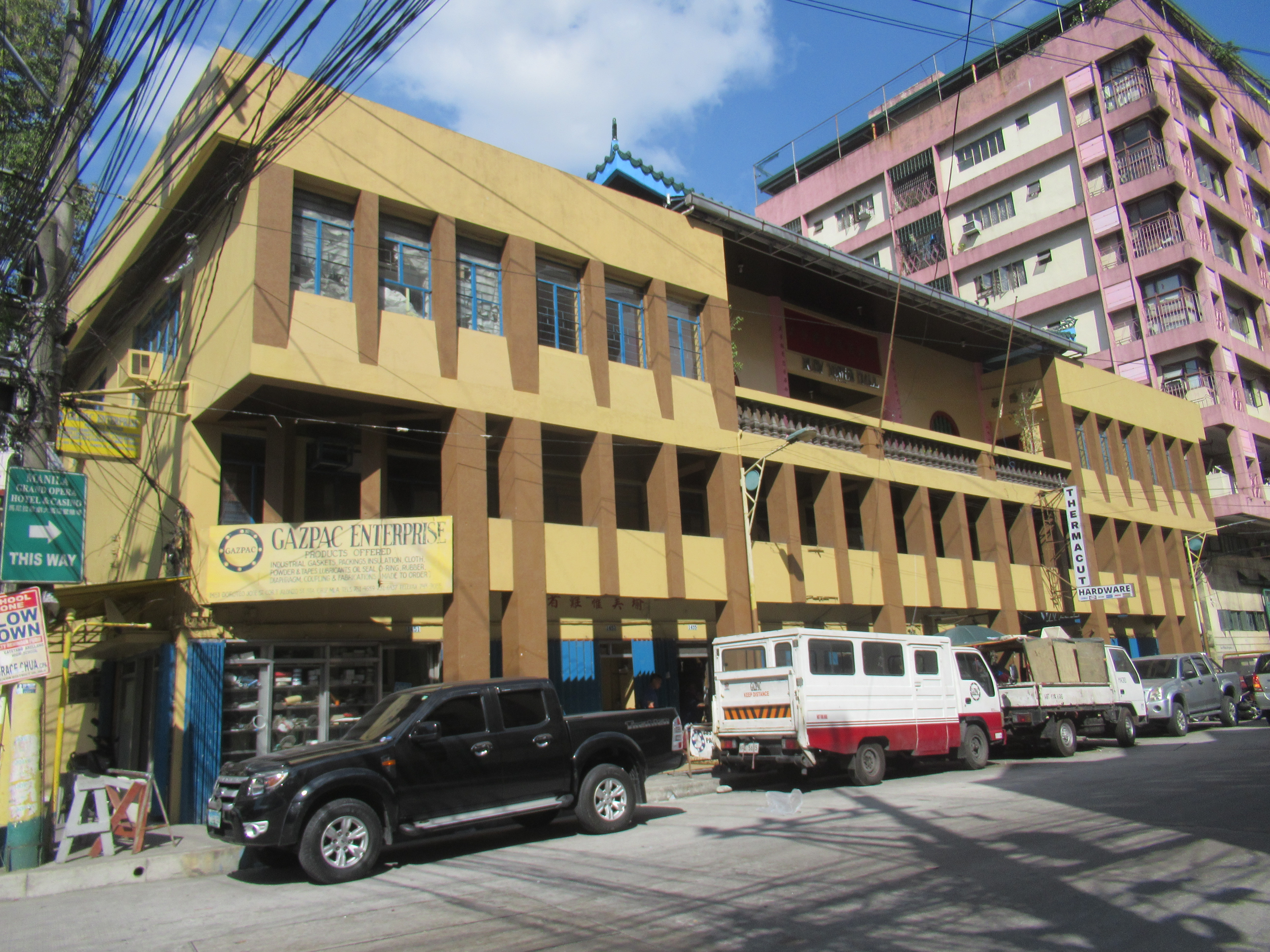
Ruby Tower Hall

== Memorial ==
The Ruby Tower Memorial Hall is a two-story structure on the site, made from the portion of the building that remained standing, where the victims are remembered. Built in 1974, the shrine includes 100 black and white photographs of people killed in the collapse.

== See also ==
- Ruby Tower Memorial, a memorial in Manila Chinese Cemetery
