= Carlos Palanca (born 1844) =

Chinese government official and diplomat

- 陳謙善
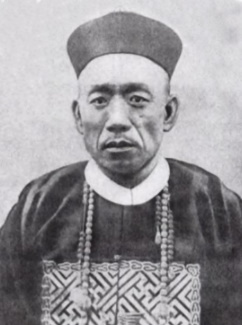

Consul general of Qing China to Spanish Philippines Acting
- In office July 28, 1898 – January 1899
- Preceded by: Office established
- Succeeded by: Engracio Guinco Palanca (Tan Kang) 陳綱

Personal details
- Pronunciation: IPA: /Tan˨ Kʰiam˧ Siɛn˦˨/
- Born: Tan Quien Sien; June 6, 1844 Tong'an, Amoy, Fukien, Qing China
- Died: September 1901 (aged 57)
- Spouse: Luciana Lim Guinco
- Children: Engracio Guinco Palanca (Tan Kang) 陳綱; Alejandra Guinco Palanca-Boncan
- Parent: Lim Chia (mother)

Carlos Lim Palanca (Tan Quien Sien) (1844–1901) (Hokkien Chinese: 陳謙善; Pe̍h-ōe-jī: Tân Khiam-siān), also known as Tan Chuey Leong (Hokkien Chinese: 陳最良; Pe̍h-ōe-jī: Tân Chòe-liông) or Tan Chueco (Hokkien Chinese: 陳最哥; Pe̍h-ōe-jī: Tân Chòe-ko), was a late 19th-century local Sangley Chinese community leader, government official, diplomat, legal mediator, lawyer and businessman in the Philippines then part of the Spanish East Indies of the Spanish Empire. During the latter part of the Spanish colonial era in the islands he served three times (1875–1877, 1885, and 1894) as the Gobernadorcillo de los Sangleyes or Capitan Chino (Chinese Captain) or cabecilla (leader) in Binondo, Manila and two times as interim headman. He was also the first acting consul general of Qing China to Spanish Philippines from July 28, 1898 to January 1899.

== Early life ==
Carlos Lim Palanca was born on June 6, 1844, named in Hokkien Chinese: 陳謙善; Pe̍h-ōe-jī: Tân Khiam-siān (later romanized in Spanish Philippines as "Tan Quien Sien") in Tong'an (同安; Tâng-oaⁿ), Amoy, Fukien, Qing China. His mother was named Lim Chia.

He first came to the Philippines in 1856 when he was twelve years old as an apprentice in a draper business by his relative. Initially, he was poor and uneducated, but he later taught himself how to read and write, such as Spanish and Classical Chinese.

Later, he converted to Roman Catholicism in the 1860s and adopted his non-Chinese name from an influential padrino (godfather), Spanish diplomat and field marshal Carlos G. Palanca of the Spanish colonial army. He married Luciana Lim Guinco and have two children, namely: Engracio Guinco Palanca (Tan Kang) and Angelica Guinco Palanca-Boncan.

== Career ==
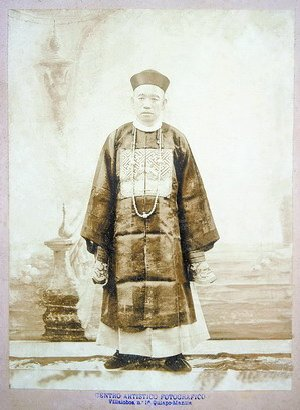
Carlos L. Palanca's (Tan Quien Sien) son, Engracio G. Palanca (Tan Kang), dressed like a mandarin bureaucrat to work as the first consul general of Qing China to Spanish Philippines

Years later, he would become a successful businessman and an established political figure in the local Chinese community of Binondo, Manila. He lived at a house and owned a store in Calle Rosario (modern Quintin Paredes St.) of Binondo. In nearby Calle San Fernando (modern San Fernando St.), he would report to work as Gobernadorcillo de los Sangleyes or Capitan Chino in the Tribunal de los Sangleyes (Chinese Tribunal), the Communidad de Chinos, and the Gremio de Chinos (Chinese Guild). Carlos L. Palanca had one son, Engracio G. Palanca (Tan Kang) (Chinese: 陳綱; Pe̍h-ōe-jī: Tân Kang) and a daughter, Alejandra G. Palanca-Boncan, who would later marry Emiliano Boncan, scion of another powerful Hokkien merchant family, who in turn intermarried with leading mestizo families, like the Limjaps.

As an affluent businessman and Chinese community leader, he, along with Lim Ong, donated land for the Manila Chinese Cemetery and financed the construction of the Chong Hock Tong Temple built in 1878 there, the oldest surviving Chinese temple in Manila, with syncretic features of Buddhism, Taoism, ancestral veneration, and Christianity.

During the late 19th century, Chinese migrants to the Philippines were required to gain appropriate documentation from the Spanish consulate in Amoy (Xiamen) first before settling in the Philippines. As early as the 1880s, Carlos, along with other Chinese cabecillas (community leaders), petitioned Beijing under Qing China and the Spanish authorities of the Philippines to set up a Qing consulate in Manila instead, especially for the protection of the economic and physical well-being of Chinese migrants and expatriates.

At some point, he would later also have Carlos Tanguinlay Palanca Sr. as a protégé.

In 1891, Carlos L. Palanca along with his son, Engracio Palanca (Tan Kang), and Mariano Velasco Chua Cheng-co financed the establishment of the Chinese General Hospital, the oldest hospital for the Chinese community in the Philippines. It was also in this same year that José Rizal's second novel, El Filibusterismo (1891), was released, where it describes a certain character known as Quiroga the Chinaman.

In Rizal's Chinese Overcoat, Alfonso Ang asserts that the character Quiroga in Rizal's novel El Filibusterismo was based on Palanca. Wilson (2004) also asserts this, that Rizal portrayed the character of Quiroga the Chinaman as a tacky and duplicitous opportunist, as a form of critique on Carlos Palanca's political and economic influence. Quiroga is portrayed just like Carlos Palanca where he is dressed as a mandarin bureaucrat with a blue-tasseled cap, advocating to open a Chinese consulate in Manila with himself as consul general.

Later in 1898, Palanca's son, Engracio, would later serve as the first official consul general of Qing China to Spanish Philippines, appointed on July 28, 1898 and approved for service in September 1898, and arriving by January 1899, due to some delays on approval by the changing acting Spanish Governors-General during the Philippine Revolution, which from July 28, 1898 to January 1899, Carlos L. Palanca (Tan Quien Sien) acted instead as the de facto acting consul general. His son's tenure would be cut short though due to the change in political control from the Spanish authorities to the Americans after the Philippine Revolution in 1899 and complaints to the American authorities from Cantonese, British, and German merchants that Carlos had previously made enemies of. Also, due to the recent death of Carlos' wife around 1899, his son decided to step down as consul-general by March 1899 to observe a period of mourning. By April 15, 1899 though, his son would instead help the Communidad de Chinos found the Anglo-Chinese School (modern-day Tiong Se Academy), the first and oldest Chinese Filipino school in the Philippines, offering foreign language, math, science, and the Confucian classics. Later, his son would instead act as the Chinese consul general in Havana, Cuba during its US military rule, but then would return again by 1900 in Manila to serve as interim consul during US military rule of the Philippines.

== Death ==
Carlos Lim Palanca (Tan Quien Sien) would later pass away in September 1901 at the age of 57 years old, passing his role to other cabecillas (community leader).

== Legacy ==
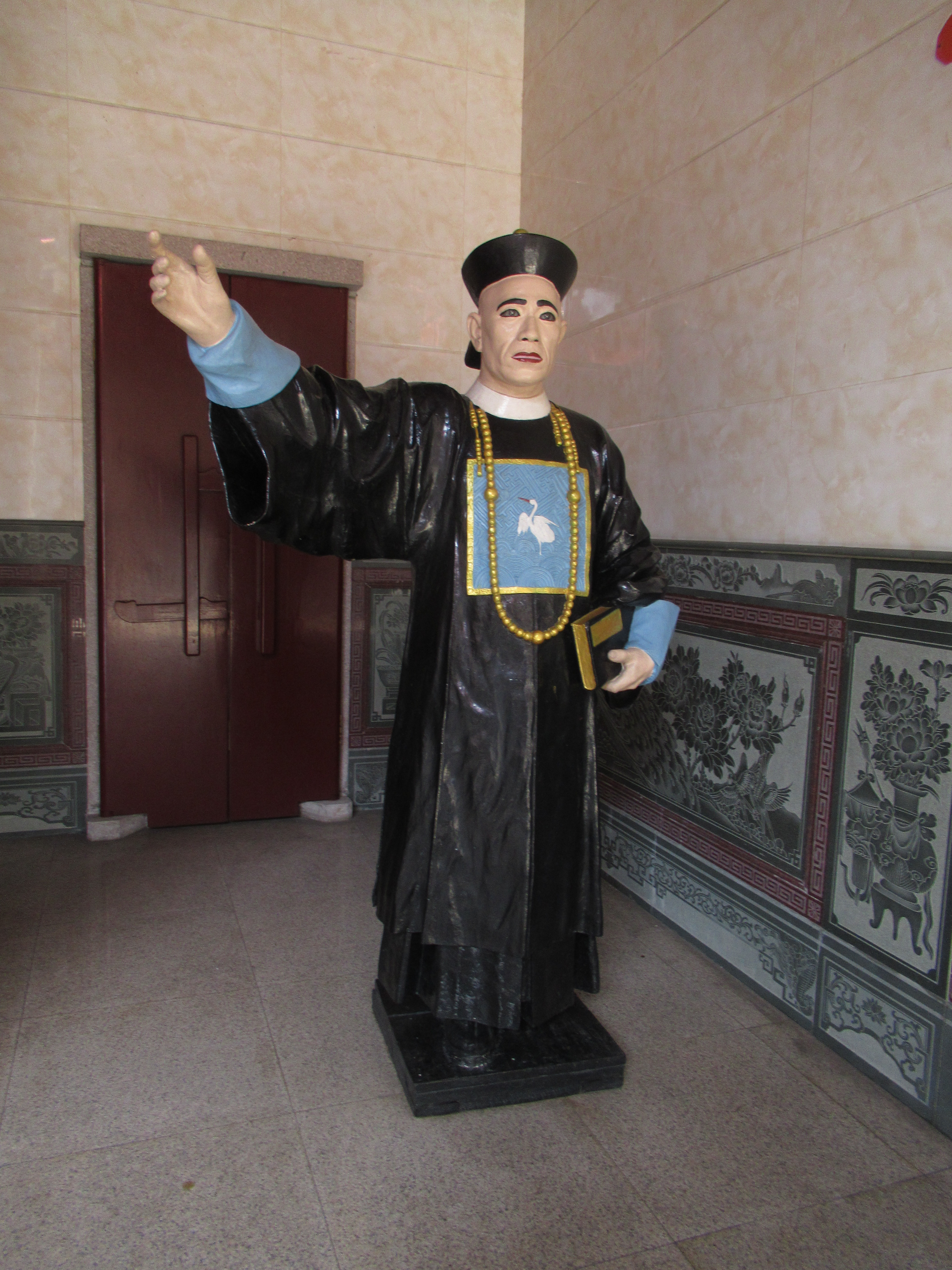
Statue at Manila Chinese Cemetery's Chong Hock Tong Temple

Carlos Tanguinlay Palanca Sr., a successful influential Chinese Filipino businessman during the American colonial era, would ascribe him as his godfather using his name too and later started the La Tondeña Distillery, Inc. by 1902 in Manila, which later became part of San Miguel Corporation (SMC) and was renamed as Ginebra San Miguel in 2003.

For Carlos Lim Palanca's (Tan Quien Sien) legacy, streets were named after him and a memorial and statue of himself were made displayed in the Manila Chinese Cemetery, primarily at the Chong Hock Tong Temple, in the same land he had donated for the cemetery and temple's founding.
