= 1968 Casiguran earthquake =

Violent earthquake and tsunami in Aurora Province, Philippines

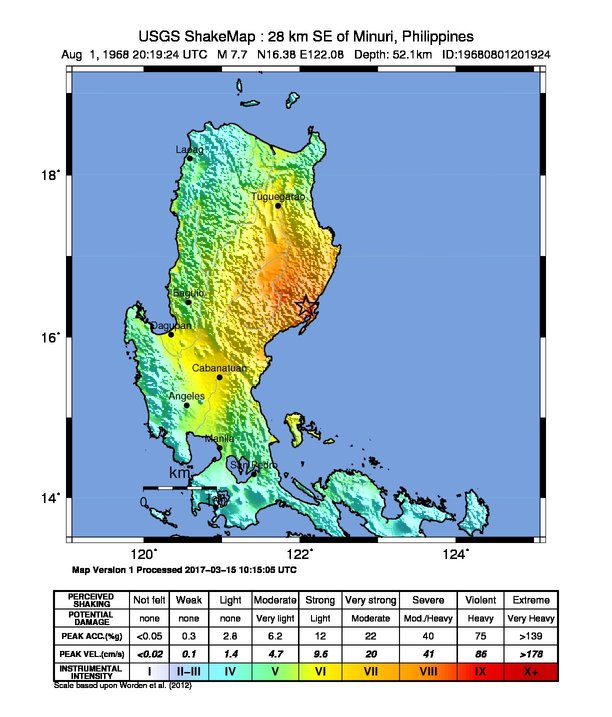
- UTC time: 1968-08-01 20:19:22
- ISC event: 817557
- USGS-ANSS: ComCat
- Local date: August 2, 1968
- Local time: 04:19:22
- Magnitude: M_{w} 7.6 M_{s} 7.3
- Depth: 25 km (16 mi)
- Epicenter: 16.316°N 122.067°E
- Type: Thrust
- Areas affected: Philippines
- Max. intensity: MMI IX (PEIS VIII)
- Tsunami: .3 m (1 ft 0 in)
- Foreshocks: 10+
- Casualties: 207–271 dead, 261 injured

The 1968 Casiguran earthquake occurred on 04:19:22 local time on August 2 with a moment magnitude of 7.6 and a maximum Mercalli intensity of IX (Violent). The thrust earthquake's epicenter was in Casiguran, Quezon (now part of Aurora province). A small non-destructive tsunami was generated and at least 207 people were killed. The majority of the deaths occurred in the collapse of a six-story building in Manila.

== Damage ==
In Manila, many structures that suffered severe damage had been built near the mouth of the Pasig River on huge alluvial deposits. A number of buildings were damaged beyond repair while others only suffered cosmetic damage. 268 people were reported to have died during the collapse of the six-story Ruby Tower, located at the corner of Doroteo Jose and Teodora Alonzo Streets in the district of Santa Cruz. (Note: Some sources put the location of the site of Ruby Tower in Binondo, also in the same city.) The entire building, save for a portion of the first and second floors at its northern end, was destroyed. Allegations of poor design and construction, as well as the use of poor-quality building materials arose. In the district of Santa Ana, one person was injured by debris from a damaged apartment building. Two more people from Aurora sub province and Pampanga died as a direct result of the quake. Around the town of Casiguran, there were several reports of landslides, the most destructive one at Casiguran Bay.

== Aftershocks ==
The aftershock sequence throughout the month of August included many moderate shocks, including fifteen over 5.0 mb. The strongest of these occurred on August 3 with a 5.9 M_{s} event that produced intensities of III–IV in Manila.

== Aftermath and legacy ==
The former location of Ruby Tower in Santa Cruz district is now a memorial hall which stands today.

== See also ==
- 1990 Luzon earthquake
- 2022 Luzon earthquake
- List of earthquakes in 1968
- List of earthquakes in the Philippines
