= Tutuban Center =

Shopping complex/transit hub in the Philippines

- Tutuban Center in September 2025

Project
- Opening date: 1993; 33 years ago
- Developer: Tutuban Properties, Inc.
- Operator: Tutuban Properties, Inc.
- Owner: Ayala Land Logistics

Location
- Interactive map of Tutuban Center
- Coordinates: 14°36′30″N 120°58′21″E
- Country: Philippines
- Location: Tondo, Manila

Tutuban Center is a shopping complex and public transit hub in Manila, Philippines that opened in 1993. It encompasses five retail buildings and a parking building in and around Manila's central train station located in the shopping precinct of Divisoria in Tondo district. The 20-hectare (49-acre) mixed-use development includes the original two-story brick and iron main terminal building of the Ferrocaril de Manila-Dagupan (later Manila Railroad Company, and now Philippine National Railways or PNR) built in 1887, a declared national historical building by the National Historical Commission of the Philippines since 1934. It also includes the Bonifacio Plaza fronting the old terminal building on Recto Avenue where a statue of Andrés Bonifacio was erected in 1971. Its integrated mall complex houses a mix of wholesale and retail bazaars and covers only 8.5 hectares (21 acres) of the total 20-hectare development. The complex will house the interchange station between the proposed North–South Commuter Railway and an extension of the Manila Light Rail Transit System Line 2 according to the masterplan submitted by the Japan International Cooperation Agency in 2015. Its redevelopment plan also entails the construction of several mixed-use buildings, including office towers, residential buildings, hotels, a convention center, and a 300-metre (980 ft)-high observation tower to be known as the Tower of Maynila.

== Location ==
Tutuban Center occupies a full two city blocks from Recto Avenue on the south to Mayhaligue Street on the north where the present Tutuban railway station is located. It is bounded by Antonio Rivera Street to the east and Dagupan Street to the west, right in the middle of Manila's bargain shopping capital, Divisoria. The development is along the dividing line between Tondo and Binondo and is neighbored by other popular bargain malls, including 168 Shopping Mall, Dragon 8, and 999 Shopping Mall. It is also within a few blocks of Lucky Chinatown and Chinese colleges Chiang Kai-shek College and Philippine Cultural College. The entire complex is administratively under the jurisdiction of Barangay 241, Tondo.

== History ==
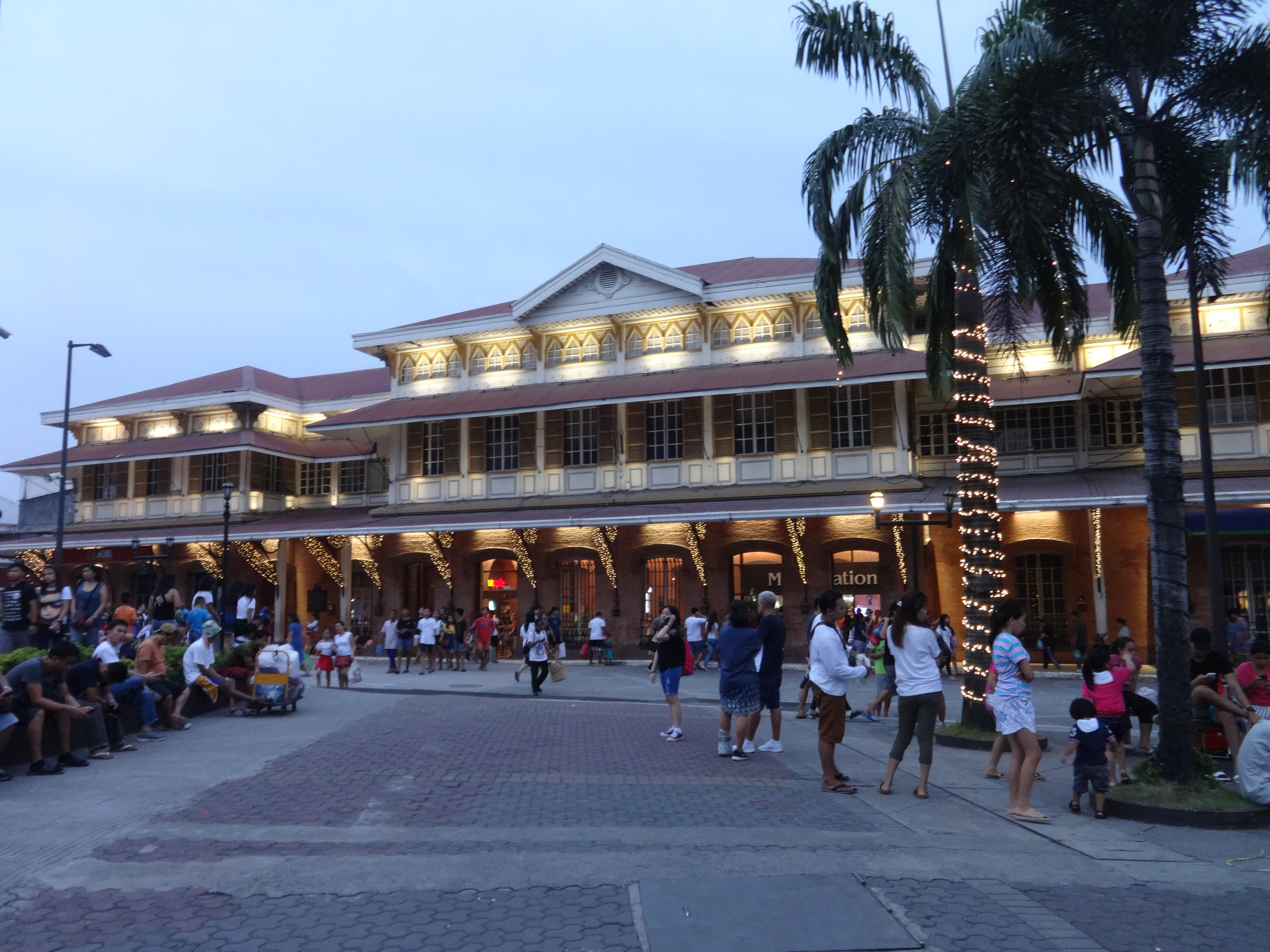
Tutuban Center Main Building 1 in 2019, site of the old Tutuban station

In 1988, the Philippine National Railways announced its plan to lease 20 hectares (49 acres) of land surrounding the Tutuban station to private firms to help promote the area as a center of business and trade. On August 23, 1989, a 25-year lease was inked between the railway company and Gotesco Investments Inc., the parent company of Ever Gotesco Malls. That same year, the PNR moved its Operations Center to its Paco station and its Training Center to its Caloocan station to make way for its redevelopment as a shopping mall. The lease rights were transferred a year later to Prime Orion Philippines Inc. under its subsidiary Tutuban Properties Inc. The company, a merger between First Lepanto Corp. and Guoco Group of Hong Kong, has since managed the site and, in 2009, secured another 25-year lease renewal beginning September 2014.

The PNR relocated its Tutuban station some 500 metres (1,600 ft) north of Recto Avenue on Mayhaligue Street in 1991. Prime Orion completed the redevelopment of the old station into the Tutuban Center Mall 1 in 1993. On February 21, 1994, the replacement station on Mayhaligue was unveiled, with President Fidel Ramos in attendance. The company was renamed Guoco Holdings Philippines, and the development subsequently expanded with the construction of new wings, buildings and parking facilities until 1998. As of 2015, the shopping complex had 1,083 retail units spread out over seven retail buildings: Center Mall 1 and 2, Cluster Building 1 and 2, Robinsons Department Store, Parking Tower, and Prime Block.

Tutuban Center launched the night market on a parking lot in 1998, which still operates today from 7pm to midnight. In September 2012, Cluster Building 1 was gutted by a fire that lasted for two days. Five months later, another fire broke out in the same building and damaged parts of the second and third floors while still under renovation from the previous blaze. The site of Cluster Building 1 was cleared and is presently being used as a parking area.

In April 2015, Tutuban Properties entered into another lease agreement with the Philippine National Railways and the Department of Transportation for the North–South Commuter Railway terminal station to be hosted within the development. In August 2015, Ayala Land acquired a majority stake in Prime Orion Properties, the leaseholder and developer of Tutuban Center. The company officially took over ownership and management of the development in February 2016. The mall's management firm was renamed Ayala Land Logistics Holdings Corp. in February 2019.

== Developments ==
Tutuban Center is a collection of six commercial buildings housing 728 tenants as of 2015. It had a combined total of 60,000 square metres (650,000 sq ft) of gross leasable area.

=== Main buildings 1 & 2 ===
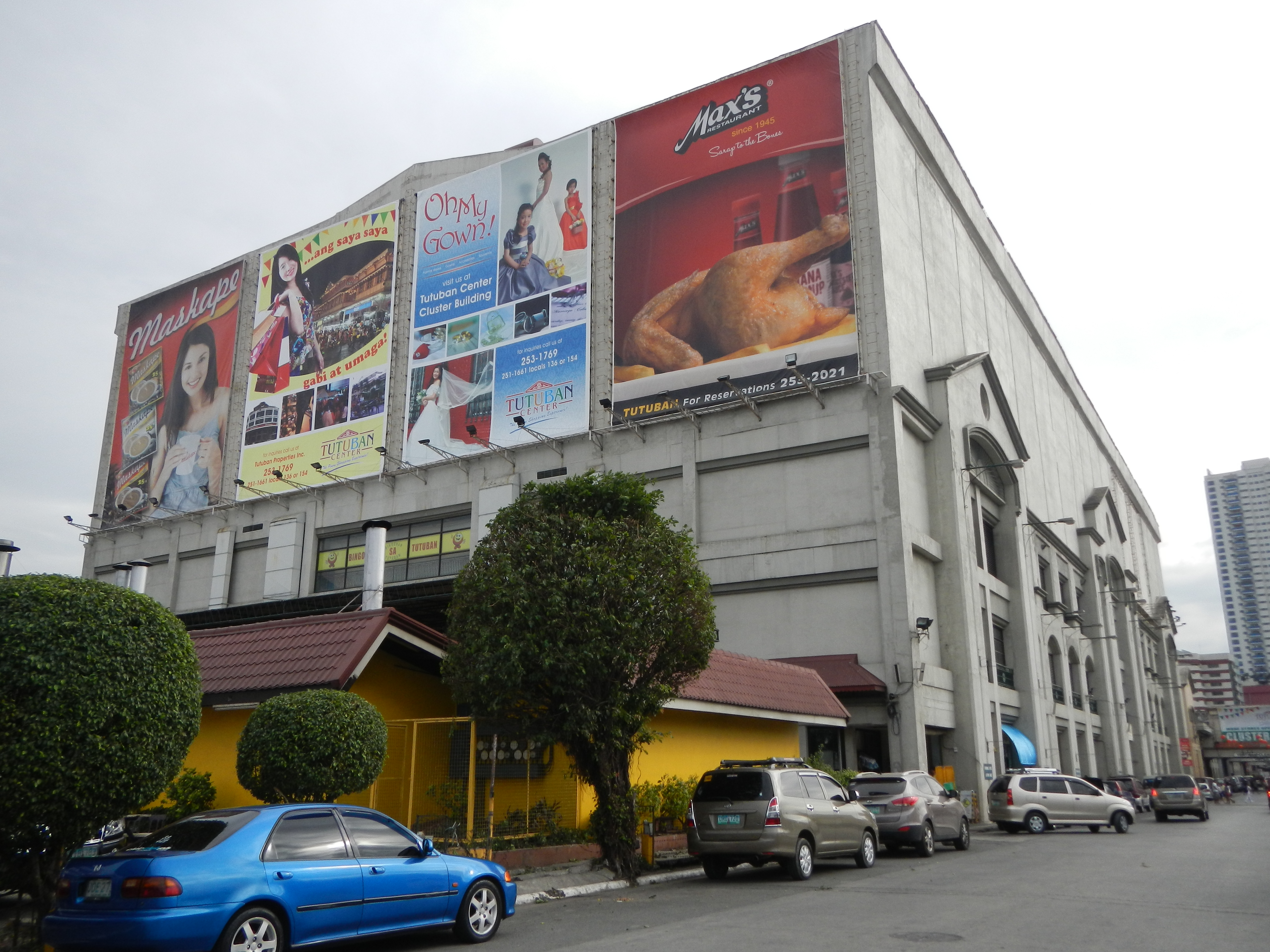
Main Building 2 (former Center Mall 2) as seen from Bonifacio Drive

Tutuban Main Buildings 1 and 2 (formerly Center Mall 1 and 2) are the two original retail structures in the development. Main Building 1 was converted to a two-story mall in 1993 but retained the old structure and façade of the Spanish Colonial-era Main Station. The heritage building has boutique stores in its ground level and a food court in its second floor. It underwent a major renovation in 2016 to restore the old terminal's original color palette, brick walls, and wrought iron pillars.

=== Cluster Building 2 ===
The Cluster Buildings occupy the western section of Tutuban Center and consisted of two wings prior to the 2013 blaze at its southern wing on Recto Avenue. The Cluster 1 Building was later demolished and converted to a parking lot, while the Cluster 2 Building remains in operation.

=== Prime Block ===
Prime Block on Recto Avenue

The Prime Block is a three-story development that houses the main wholesale and retail area of Tutuban Center. It is connected to the Main Building via pedestrian bridges. In 2012, a 41-room three-star hotel opened at the upper floor of the retail building. The ₱41 million Orion Hotel and Cafe ceased operation in September 2016 following Ayala Land's takeover of Tutuban Center.
