= Divisoria =

Commercial center in Manila, Philippines

- Commercial Center
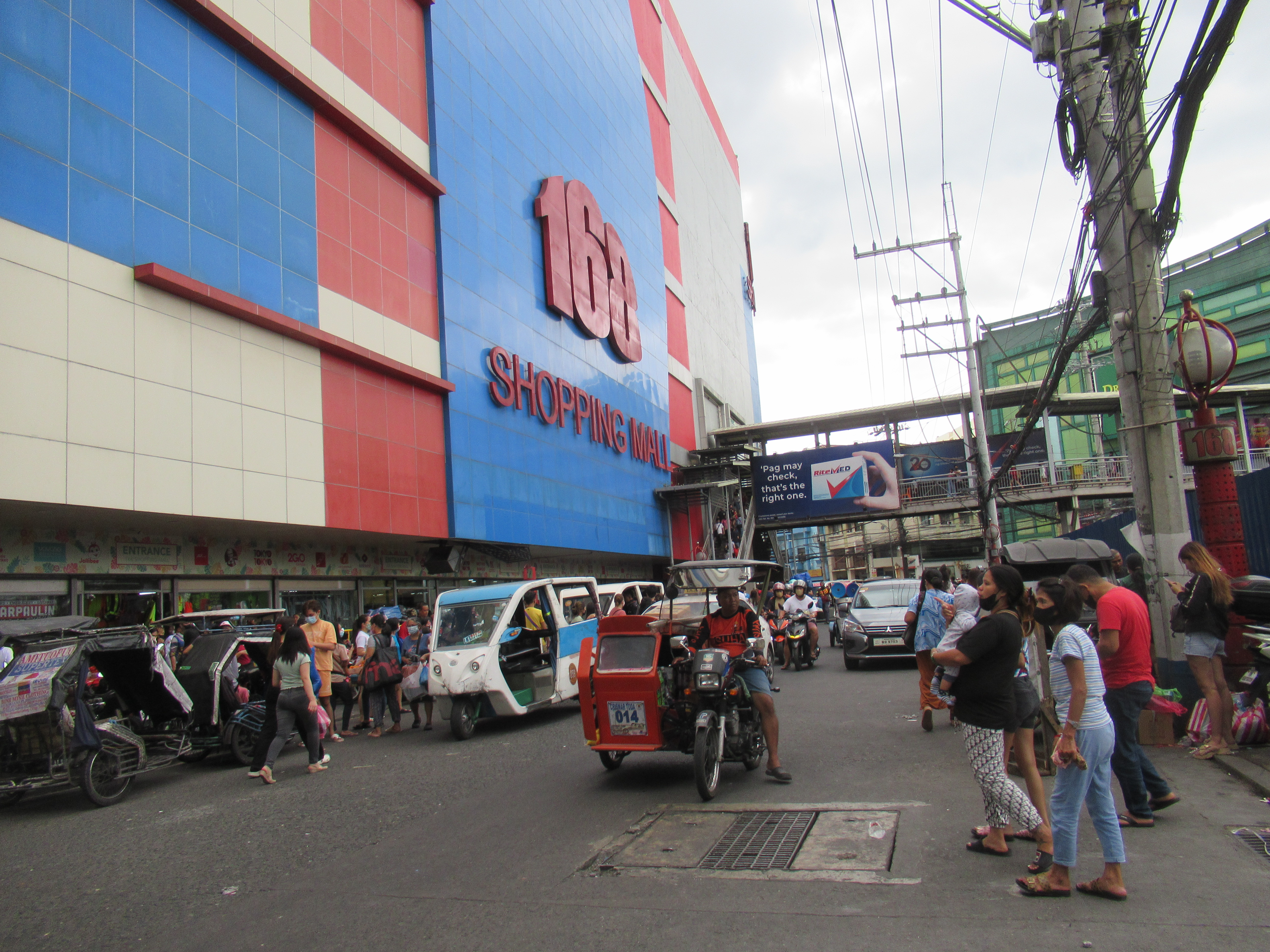
- Soler Street in Divisoria

- Location within Metro Manila
- Coordinates: 14°36′24″N 120°58′24″E
- Country: Philippines
- Region: National Capital Region
- City: Manila
- District: Tondo, Binondo, and San Nicolas

Area
  - Land: 0.5 km^{2} (0.19 sq mi)
- Time zone: UTC+8 (PST)

Divisoria (Tagalog: [dɪbɪˈsɔɾjɐ, dɪvɪˈsɔɾjɐ]) is a commercial sub-district along the districts of Tondo, Binondo, and San Nicolas in Manila, Philippines known for its mass market shops selling low-priced commodities; and for its diverse manufacturing activities. Tutuban Center is situated within the commercial hub along with a centrally located night market. The area has a variety of bazaars, bargain stalls and points of interest.

== Etymology ==
Divisoria is a term of Spanish origin, which translates as "divide" or "division." A variation of the term is línea divisoria, which translates as "dividing line." While the term can be used in the general sense of division, it can also be used with a geographical connotation.

This region was referred to as Divisoria due to its historical function dating back to the Spanish colonial period. That is, Divisoria "divided" Intramuros, the "gated city," from Parian, where the Chinese were racially segregated. It was after this division that the retail industry driven by Chinese merchants flourished, which led to the contemporary identity of Divisoria.

== Geography ==
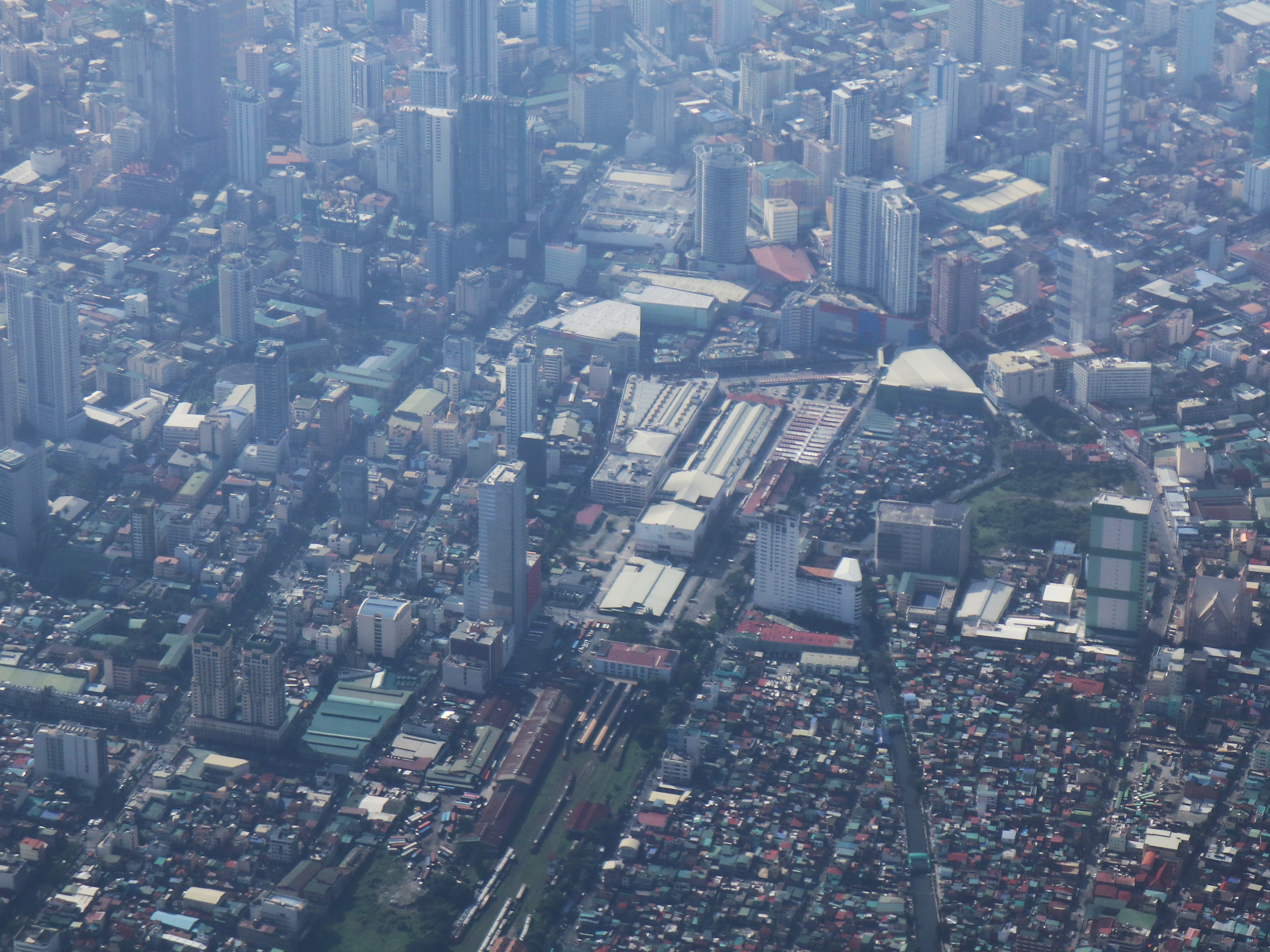
Aerial view of Divisoria

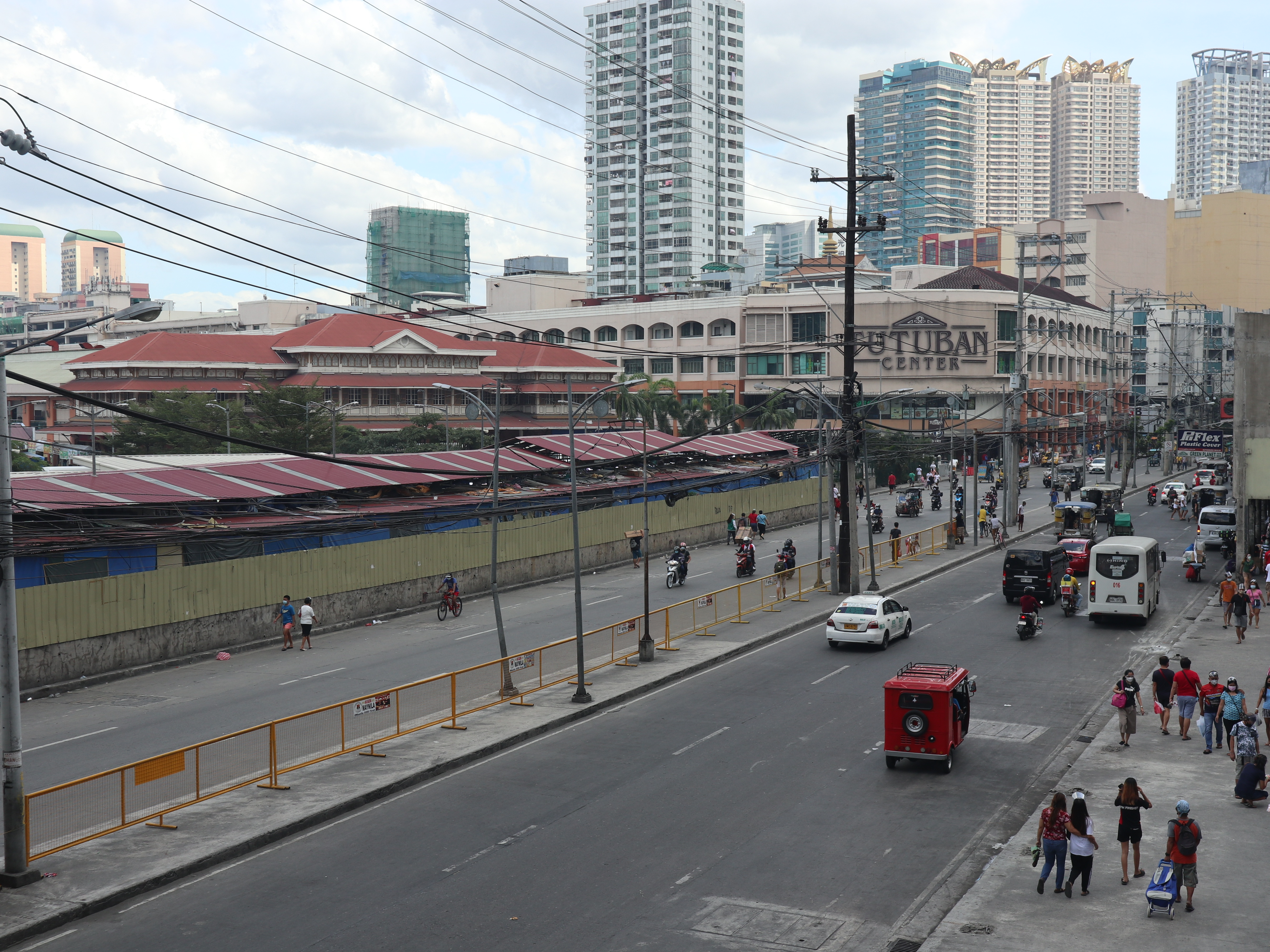
Divisoria is bisected by Recto Avenue

Divisoria is located in the districts of Tondo, Binondo, and San Nicolas in the Manila, thus part of the city's first, second, and third legislative districts. With no defined borders, Divisoria spans an area of about 0.5 square kilometers (0.19 sq mi) and is bisected by Recto Avenue. It has gained a reputation for its poorly sanitized streets and poor-quality products but with the establishment of the Tutuban Centermall in 1993, the area saw the rise of other shopping malls that attracted by those from the higher classes.

Divisoria is known for its dimly lit streets and "fly-by-night" vendors. In response to commercial traffic and crime occurrences, Manila Mayor Joseph Estrada installed 137 new lamp posts along Benavidez and Asuncion Streets in the area.

The market's reputation for poor sanitation has brought attention for further research, particularly the currencies circulating around it as well as its vegetables. Sampled in a study, parasitic contamination of coins and paper bills obtained from selected public markets in Metro Manila has been reported. Furthermore, vegetable samples were obtained from Divisoria and other markets from Quezon City and Muntinlupa. The prevalence of parasitic infestation of the samples was 45%. According to the study, other public markets obtained their vegetables from Divisoria. Both studied recommended extra caution to safeguard oneself from possible causes of infections.

=== Architecture ===
On July 23, 2004, the SAI Building at Divisoria collapsed. Having stood for five years at eight stories high, the building was located at the intersection of Padre Rada and Juan Luna streets. While there were no injuries or fatalities, there were cases on property damage. This incident entails that the National Building Code is not being strictly enforced.

According to Harry Wong, the construction engineer of SAI Building, the projected durability of the building was 10 years. However, the foundation of the building weakened due to simultaneous construction in the north side and across the building.

=== Attractions ===
- Andrés Bonifacio Monument
  - Situated in front of the Tutuban Center along with the Tutuban Railway Station is a monument to Andrés Bonifacio erected by the National Historical Institute in 1971. The inscription on the monument reads that Andres Bonifacio was born on the very site on November 30, 1863, but this is factually inaccurate according to the author of the first Bonifacio biography published in 1911, as it states that he was born inside a house along Calle Alvarado in the Binondo district.
- Tutuban Center
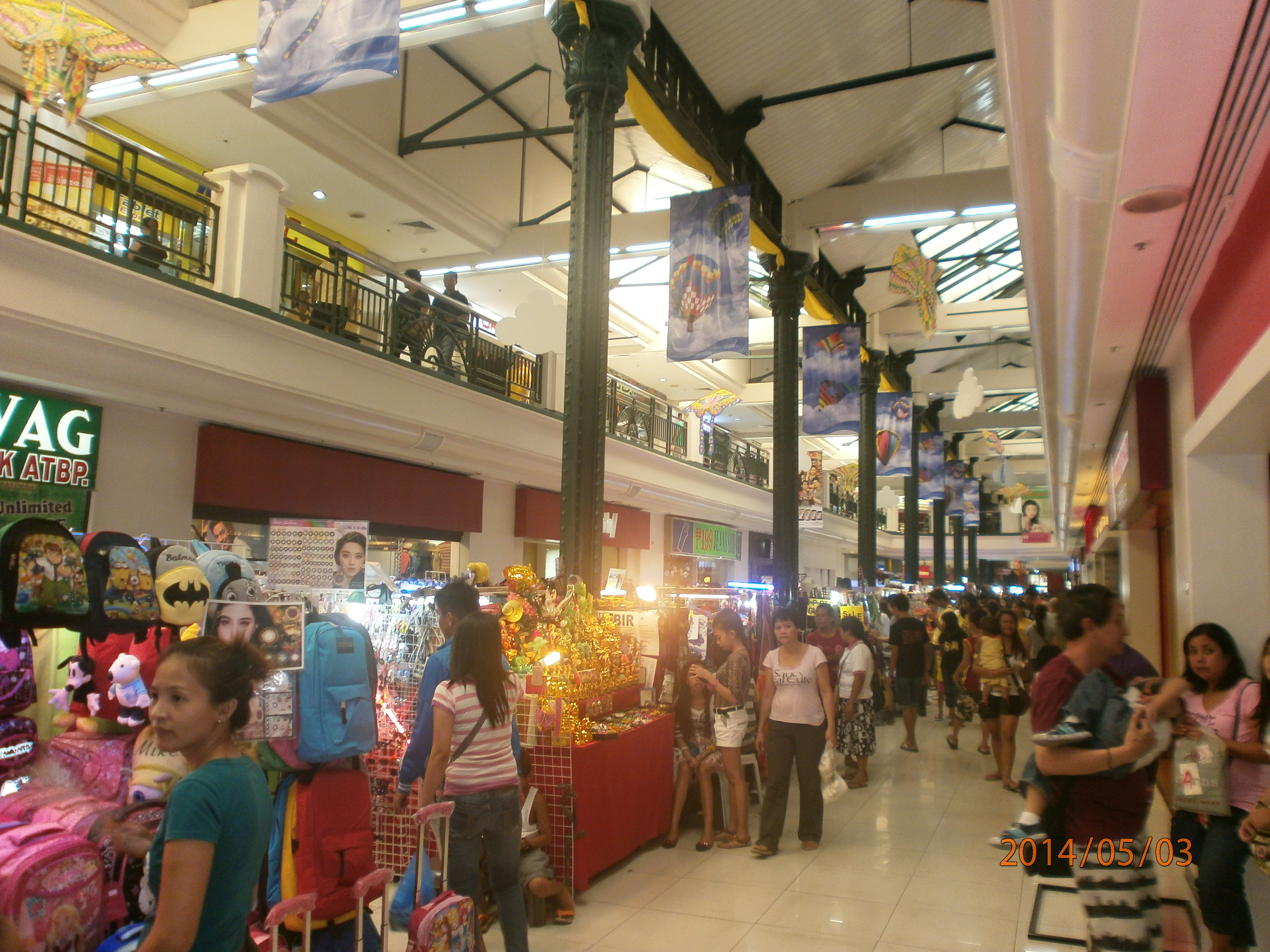
  Interior of Tutuban Centermall
  - Tutuban Center is a fully air-conditioned shopping center with security and utility personnel, along with bazaars that fill a substantial amount of floorspace. The entirety of the mall is made up of 7 buildings, Centermalls 1 and 2, Cluster Buildings 1 and 2, the Prime Block (a higher-end market place), the Robinson's Department Store, and a seven-story Parking Tower. It was developed by the Prime Orion Group with a seed fund of PHP5 billion in 1988, all on 8.5 hectares of land.
  - In 2016, Ayala Land Inc. (ALI) acquired Tutuban Center with the interest of preserving and further developing the mall, along with its neighboring historical sites, such as the Andres Bonifacio Monument and the Philippine National Railway. Moreover, the mall is regarded as a key terminal interchange between the North Rail, South Rail and the Line 2 West Extension, as well as "the heart of Divisoria retail and wholesale shopping."
- Divisoria Mall
  - The Divisoria Mall is located in the San Nicolas district. Inside the shopping mall are gift shops and a food court. In 1909, Manila's earliest and biggest market was built in the same area. The market transitioned into a mall during the mid-1990s, in which it was rebranded and rebuilt into the current Divisoria Mall. Formerly, it was among the first to offer an air-conditioned interior, a cinema, a food court, and a basement wet market. However, prior to its reconstruction in 2016, it caught fire in 2013. Despite not having a cinema anymore, the upper three floors of the mall currently contain several shops and a food court.
- 168 Shopping Mall
- Lucky Chinatown
- Seng Guan Temple
- Tutuban station

== History ==
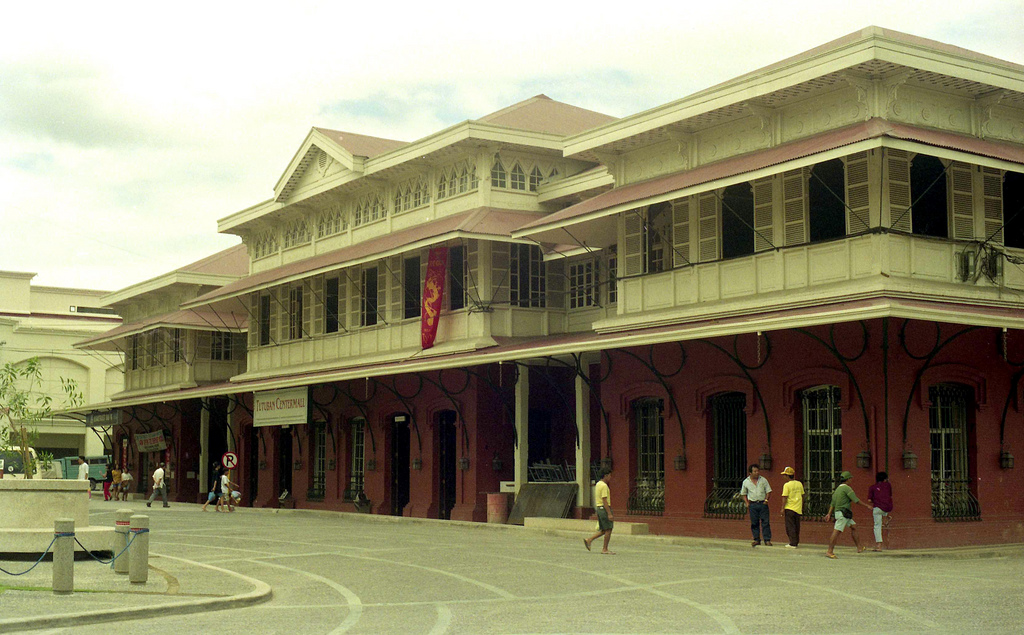
Façade of the original Tutuban station built in 1892, which is now part of Tutuban Center

The origins of Divisoria can be traced back to the Spanish Colonial Era when non-Christian Chinese traders were prohibited to live and do business inside the nearby Intramuros. This led the ethnic Chinese to set up shop in Binondo which caused the area situated near the Pasig River to become a thriving commercial hub. The market thrived on its convenient transportation facilities that allowed for the easy transport of goods like the natural canal that connected the market to Pasig River, the convenient access for trucks and buses from provinces and the railroad station also known as the Tutuban Railway Station or the Manila Railroad that passed within the block of the market.

After the Battle of Manila during World War II, the areas surrounding Divisoria (Tondo) were ruined, leaving Divisoria Market's Spanish-style buildings preserved, but still affecting the businesses there. The use of the Manila Railroad was phased out and replaced by buses and trucks for cargo and passengers. The concentration of stores surrounding the railroad station were not rebuilt. The station was ordered to be demolished in 1996 to make way for a shopping mall, but the demolition of the station and the plans to build the mall were cancelled. The building's face remains intact to this day and is used as the main entrance to the Tutuban Centermall.

The buildings in the area were not maintained well and the general quality of the area went down, but there was still a high demand for the space surrounding the area. Divisoria Market generates a significant income for the city, bringing in millions of pesos. Divisoria Market has since then grown into an even bigger market and is often said to be a great investment because of its many commercial and retail establishments, and multinational financial medical and educational institutions. The price of land in the area continues to rise, and with a growing population and economy, the demand for better living and working conditions grew as well.

On June 25, 1991, the Anti-Littering Ordinance was passed, which prompted the police to remove street vendors from where they usually set up shop. While this law was suspended in 2003, the Metropolitan Manila Development Authority (MMDA) has re-implemented the law starting September 16, 2010. In further efforts to sanitize the Divisoria streets, Manila will replace all gasoline-operated pedicabs with electric tricycles (or e-trikes). As of January 2018, Manila City has already begun distributing electric tricycles to drivers and operators in Binondo, among others.

== Culture ==
=== Shopping ===
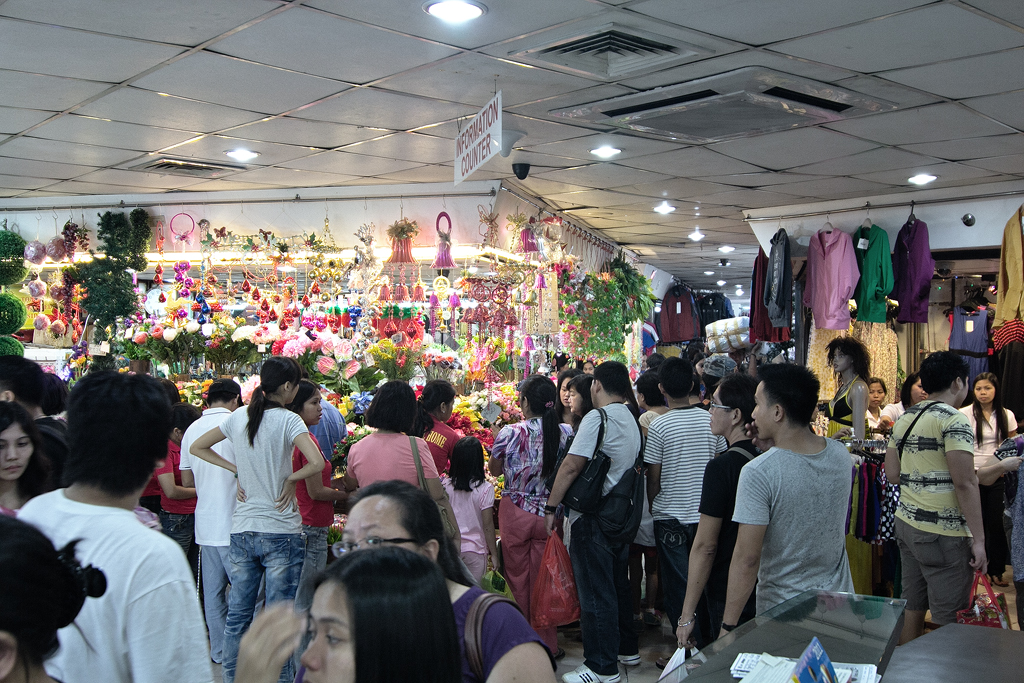
Shoppers in 168 Shopping Mall

According to the Manila Police District, there have been almost 1 million shoppers in Divisoria as of November 2017. On average, 700,000 people go to Divisoria daily.

==== Sidewalk vendors ====
According to the Task Force on Urban Conscientization (TFUC), there are three types of small-business vendors:
(a) sidewalk (bangketa) vendor
(b) street (kalye) vendor
(c) itinerant (walang puwesto)

As of 1992, there was an average of 6000 families (or 30,000 individuals) that relied on such small-business vending for livelihood. The TFUC also noted that Mondays, Wednesdays, and Saturdays yielded the weakest, moderate, and strongest sales, respectively.

While not comprehensive or without exception, some commonalities found among the interviews held by the TFUC are enumerated below.

- The sidewalk vendors would prefer adopting a different profession. However, they do not have the capacity to choose a different vocation, due to lack of prior schooling, as well as lack of capital to be invested in either further schooling or career.
- Despite having the capacity to set their own schedule for vending products, the primary reason for resuming work without breaks is that while they are unable to pursue an alternative profession, they harbor the interest of afford their children an education, thus opening up the possibility of uplifting the household's financial situation.
- In accordance with the currently effective Anti-Littering Ordinance, sidewalk vendors continue to be "cleared" or warded off by police. Their products, ranging from fruits and vegetables to non-consumables, are confiscated by authorities in order to further discourage such activities of illegal vending.
- However, they are illegally and rampantly permitted to continue vending products, given that they bribe the police (bigyan ng lagay).

In relation to the lagay culture in Divisoria, there have been cases in the area wherein individuals have posed as authorities and requested either bribes or fees from vegetable dealers and vendors, as of August 2016. Such individuals claimed to have been mandated by Manila Mayor Joseph Estrada to collect fees for a "protection racket" for particular locations in Divisoria. Vendors reported to have shelled out ₱2,800 per week, in order to use a portion of Recto Avenue for unloading their produce. According to Mayor Estrada, such frauds have already been perpetuated since the 1980s, "since the time of [former Mayors Lito] Atienza and [Alfredo] Lim." Dennis Alcoreza, head of the Manila Traffic and Parking Bureau, reported that an estimated 20 to 30 vegetable trucks traveling from Baguio City, Benguet province, among other crop-producing areas, engage in such monetary collection frauds every night, which effectively disrupts traffic flow. Moreover, on the average, dealers leave behind roughly 16 truckloads of trash daily, which is collected by the city government. Mayor Estrada has thus since carried out investigations on individuals engaging in such frauds.

==== Types of goods and services ====
As reported by the TFUC, various types of goods and services are sold in the streets of Divisoria, namely:
(a) unprocessed food (fruits, vegetables)
(b) processed food (tinapa, daing, longganisa)
(c) prepared food (canned or cooked)
(d) non-food/durable (furniture, car parts, radios)
(e) non-food/non-durable (rubber sandals, garter, shoes, jewelry)
(f) textile/clothing (T-shirts, curtains)
(g) services (key duplication, fortune telling)

While Divisoria is regarded as a shopping mecca for products sold significantly cheaper compared to retail shops, there has been the phenomenon of counterfeit, toxic, or otherwise hazardous products being sold in its malls. The phenomenon was sufficiently salient to either rouse the attention of several local organizations, or have been revealed to contravene particular policies or authorities.

On May 7, 2017, the Ecowaste Coalition released a public service announcement cautioning consumers against buying a cheap plastic chicken toy labeled as "Shrilling Chicken" being sold in Divisoria. This is for the reason that toxic materials such as plastic additives that can disrupt the physiological development of children (e.g., malformed genitals for boys, early onset of puberty for girls) are present in the toy.

A statement released by the Department of Health's A.O. 2009-005 as amended in 2011 reads: "it shall be unlawful for any person to manufacture for sale, offer for sale, distribute in commerce, or import into the country any children's toys that contain concentrations of more than 0.1 percent by weight of di-(2-ethylhexyl) phthalate (DEHP), dibutyl phthalate (DBP), or benzyl butyl phthalate (BBP)." In violation of that, the Shrilling Chicken toy contains phthalates DEHP and DBP up to 19 percent and 13 percent, respectively. The Shrilling Chicken has already been banned in several European countries such as Luxembourg (2017), Spain (2016), the Czech Republic (2014), and Sweden (2013).

One similar case involved Pokémon toys being sold for as cheap as ₱5 per unit, which were revealed to contain concentrations of lead as well as to pose a choking or swallowing hazard to young children due to the small size of the toys. In a screening process organized by the Ecowaste Coalition, 38 out of 225 samples contained a concentration of lead that is prohibited according to the Department of Environment and Natural Resources.

Another case investigated by Ecowaste involved imitation lipstick, which also contains harmful concentrations of lead. At minimum, the screened products contained 55 parts per million (ppm), 35 ppm above from the maximum limit set by Asean Cosmetic Directive. Two samples contained traces of mercury. Even Senator De Lima advocated against this phenomenon in her announcement, "This is a threat to public health. It's alarming that people who are looking for low-cost alternatives to the popular and expensive brands can easily be fooled into buying the cheap products without knowing that these goods can endanger their life."

=== Traffic ===
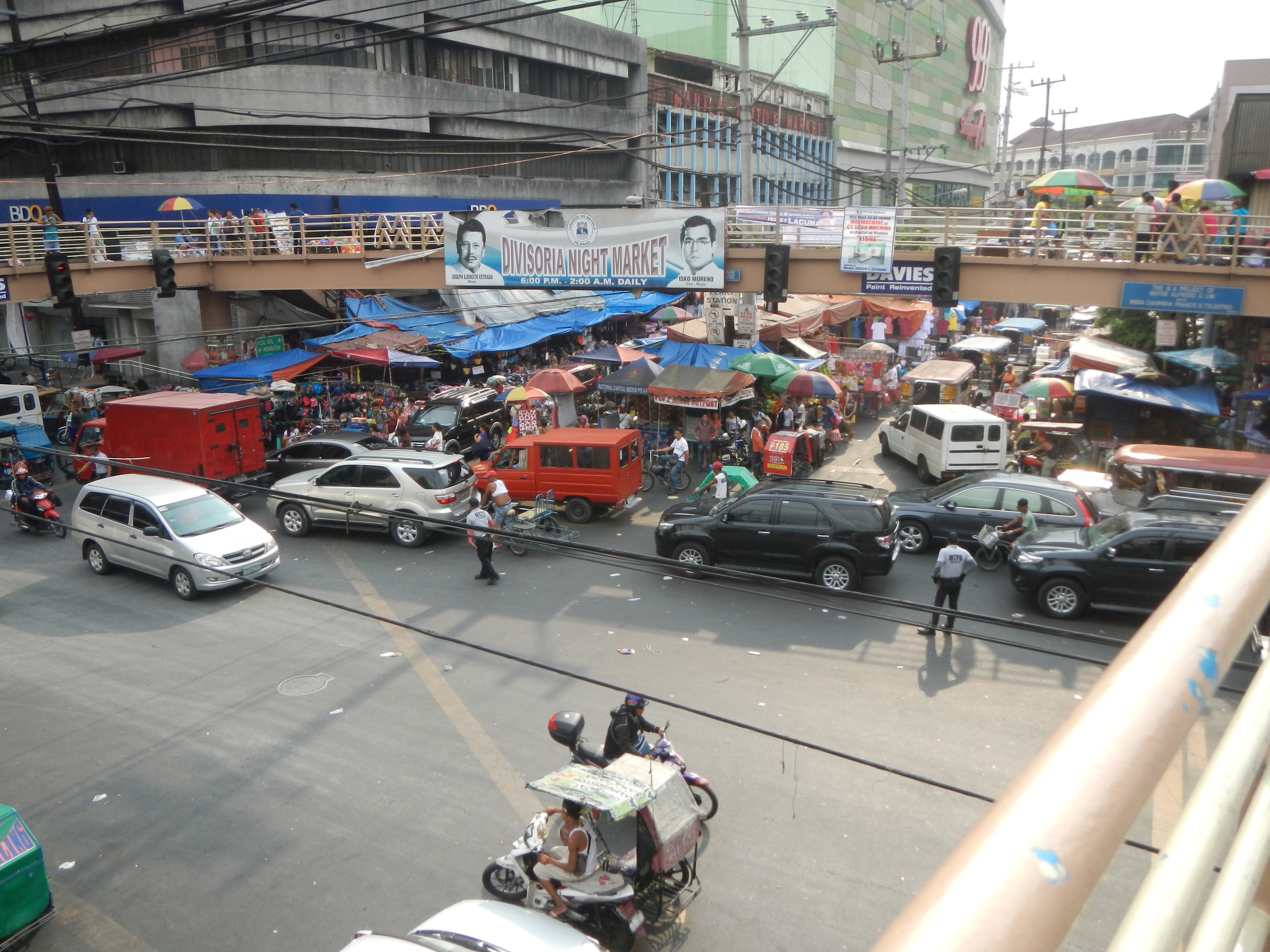
Street vendors along Recto Avenue in May 2016

The traffic problem in Divisoria is a complex issue caused by many factors that makes it hard to fix. Illegal structures that are built on sidewalks force pedestrians to walk on the roads which worsen the traffic congestion.

Joseph Estrada, the mayor of Manila from 2013 to 2019, has made many efforts to improve the decongestion of traffic in Manila and has been working on the cleanup of small businesses without permits and the banning of certain trucks. His successor, Isko Moreno, also led in declogging the roads of vendors and organizing them.

=== Crime ===
Divisoria is said to be notorious for petty crimes such as pick-pocketing or lack of traffic discipline. In 2016, petty crimes were recorded to have significantly declined attributing to the Philippine anti-drug war. The most recent criminal act in 2018 was of a stall owner in 999 Mall Building 2 of the shopping mall complex who was shot dead, the victim's wife was also reported to have been injured. Only one armed assailant was confirmed through surveillance footage.

== Appearances in popular culture ==
- In the 25th season of American reality-competition program The Amazing Race, teams performed a task involving delivering bunot (coconut husk) and walis tingting to different stalls in the market.
- In Dolce Amore (2016), Divisoria made an appearance during Serena's (Liza Soberano) shopping scene, in which she had to find a gown due to the few available styles from top designer boutiques.
- In The Gift (2019), Divisoria was featured as the setting of the TV series.
