= Mass marketing =

Marketing strategy in which the product is marketed to the largest audience possible

Mass marketing is a marketing strategy in which a firm decides to ignore market segment differences and appeal to the whole market with one offer or one strategy, which supports the idea of broadcasting a message that will reach the largest number of people possible, in contrast to niche marketing. Traditionally, it has focused on radio, television and newspapers as the media used to reach this broad audience.

== Background ==
Mass marketing or undifferentiated marketing has its origins in the 1920s with the inception of mass radio use. This gave corporations an opportunity to appeal to a wide variety of potential customers. Due to this, variety marketing had to be changed in order to persuade a wide audience with different needs into buying the same thing. It has developed over the years into a worldwide multibillion-dollar industry. Although sagging in the Great Depression it regained popularity and continued to expand through the 40s and 50s. It slowed during the anti-capitalist movements of the 60's and 70's before coming back stronger than before in the 80's, 90's and today. These trends are due to corresponding upswings in mass media, the parent of mass marketing. For most of the twentieth century, major consumer-products companies held fast to mass marketing- mass-producing, mass distributing and mass promoting about the same product in about the same way to all consumers. Mass marketing creates the largest potential market, which leads to lowered costs. It is also called overall marketing.

Over the years marketing activities have notably transitioned from traditional forms, such as television, radio and print advertisements to a more digitalized forms, such as the utilisation of online media platforms to reach various consumers. Huang (2009), explains three chief attributes digital marketing has enhanced; one being "Penetrating Power" which is to have the ability to reach a wider circle of customers in the market, accredited to the ease of online communication. Digital marketing allows for a marketer to reach a larger-scale audience in a more efficient and cost-effective manner, which is ultimately what Mass Marketing seeks to do.

== Persuasion ==
For a mass marketing campaign to be successful, the advertisement must appeal to a "set of product needs that are common to most consumers in a target market." In this case it is unnecessary to segment consumers into separate niches as, in theory, the product should appeal to any customer's wants and/or needs. Many mass marketing campaigns have been successful through persuading audiences using the central route to persuasion, as well as using the peripheral route to persuasion, according to the Elaboration Likelihood Model. Lane et al. state that the different types of persuasion depend on the "involvement, issue-relevant thinking, or elaboration that a person dedicates to a persuasive message." Political campaigns are a prime example of central persuasion through mass marketing; where the content of the communication involves a detailed level of thinking which seeks to achieve a cognitive response. Contrastingly, a toothpaste advertisement would typically persuade the audience peripherally; where there is low involvement and consumers rely on "heuristics" to alter their behaviour. John Watson was a leading psychologist in mass marketing with his experiments in advertising.

== Strategies ==
=== Shotgun approach ===
The shotgun theory is an approach of mass marketing. It involves reaching as many people as possible through television, cable and radio. On the Web, it refers to a lot of advertising done through banners to text ads in as many websites as possible, in order to get enough eyeballs that will hopefully turn into sales. An example of shotgun marketing would be to simply place an ad on primetime television, without focusing on any specific group of audience. A shotgun approach increases the odds of hitting a target when it is more difficult to focus on one. A potential limitation of using the shotgun approach is that each receiver will interpret the message in their own way, whether this be the way the sender intends for it to be decoded, or not. In other words, the receiver's "frame of reference" at the time of decoding enables them to perceive a brand message in a particular way; thus, the marketer's intention may become distorted. Dahlen, Lange, & Smith (2009) claim that each receiver has different "attitudes, values and perceptions stemming from knowledge, experience or the influence of other people." In situations where there is no specific target market, mass marketers should simply focus on grabbing the attention of consumers in "different, surprising, original and entertaining" ways in order to generate the most desirable feedback.

=== Guerrilla marketing ===
Guerrilla marketing aims to cut through clutter by attracting attention in unique, memorable and imaginative ways to "maximise interest in a firm's goods and services while minimizing the costs of advertising." According to Kotler (2007, as cited in Bigat, 2012) this type of marketing was traditionally carried out by small to medium-sized enterprises but has become more predominant in today's society where competition is substantially thicker. It is particularly effective at reaching a large-scale audience due to the captivating nature of the advertisement.

Bigat discusses the role of technology, more specifically, of the internet and its effectiveness of disseminating a large message from the sender to receivers; to which he states that "Internet blogs, online magazines, newspapers along with chat and forum pages are crucial arenas for getting the message across." Logically, this is due to the fact that digitalised media generates more efficient feedback from consumers. Mass marketers should aim to effect the behaviour of their consumers by having them engage with the brand in a positive way, which, in turn tends to more activity (both on and offline) as well as further market penetration.

== Use and products sold ==
Mass marketing is used to effect attitude change to as wide an audience as possible. Often this would take the form of selling a product like toothpaste. Toothpaste isn't made specially for one consumer and it is sold in huge quantities. A company or individual who manufactures toothpaste wishes to get more people to buy their particular brand over another. The goal is when a consumer has the option to select a tube of toothpaste that the consumer would remember the product which was marketed. Mass marketing is the opposite of niche marketing, where a product is made specially for one person or a group of persons. Other products of mass marketing are furniture, artwork, automobiles, residential communities, fizzy drinks and personal computers. Typically, things which are perceived to be necessary/essential to the consumer are subject to mass marketing. Resources of mass marketing provide cost-effective marketing solutions for small and micro businesses, including start-ups. Even "products" like politicians and services from professions such as law, chiropractic and medicine, are subject to mass marketing.

== Questions of quality ==
To further increase profits, mass marketed products touted as "durable goods" are often made of substandard material, so that they deteriorate prematurely. This practice is called planned obsolescence. Not only does this lower production costs, but it ensures future sales opportunities by preventing the market from becoming saturated with high-quality, long-lasting goods. The forces of a free market tend to preclude the sale of substandard staples, while disposability, technological innovations, and a culture of collection all facilitate planned obsolescence.

Many mass marketed items are considered staples. These are items people are accustomed to buying new when their old ones wear out (or are used up). Cheaper versions of durable goods are often marketed as staples with the understanding that they will wear out sooner than more expensive goods, but they are so cheap that the cost of regular replacement is easily affordable.

== Benefits ==
Since the target audience is broad, the number of successful hits is high despite the low probability of a single person turning up, and if all the efforts in one particular area goes in vain, the eventual loss is less compared to one in a narrowly focused area. Production costs per unit are low on account of having one production run for homogeneous product, and marketing research/advertising costs are also relatively low as well, which, as a whole, leads to higher potentials of sales volume and efficiency of scale in a much larger market.

Standardization also makes branding and advertising easier, since these mass-marketing activities depend on a high level of product standardization, which goods can reach because they can be produce in large quantities with centralized control. It can also help maintain consitent quality acrross locations, which keeps mass promotion credible. .

Mass media marketing can also support growth. In a study of German B2B high-tech start-ups, a larger share of the budget spent on mass-media marketing was linked to better performance in later life-cycle stages, but not in earlier ones, as these firms then try to grow quickly and need to reach a broader base of customers.

== Drawbacks ==
Due to increased competition and the complexity of consumers' wants and needs in today's society, Bennett and Strydom (2001) suggest that mass marketing campaigns are less likely to be successful; as consumers have a range of specific tastes and requirements that they would more likely find in alternative products.

Advertising may also contribute to climate change direclty, througth the energy use of online advertising, and indirectly, by encouraging materialism and consumerism.

Mainstream marketing tools and tactics have also been critized for driving exessive consumption ans the unsustainable production, waste and emissions that accompany it.

A time-series analysis of the United States over the period 1900-2000 also found advertising expenditure to significantly influence overall personal consumption, although its effects varied by type of consumption. The authors linked theses findings to research on the drivers of grobal environmental change, highliting the role of mass advertising in driving consumption and then global environmental change.

== Psychological impact ==
Mass marketing has been criticized for the psychological impact on viewers, as critics believe that it makes the reader more vulnerable to issues such as eating disorders. In a 2006 article by Sharlene Hesse-Biber et al. for the Women's Studies International Forum, they state that the "food, diet, and fitness industries, aided by the media, espouse the message that independence for women in general, means self-improvement, self-control, and that it is the women's responsibility to achieve the ultra-slender body ideal".

Critics also note that marketers have people fill out surveys with specific questions that allow them to have the information they need to best target and persuade their potential customers, which can manipulate them into believing that they need or want the product being marketed. Historically, mass marketing has been used to popularize products such as mouthwash and cigarettes via advertisements and slogans, in order to reach markets that may have previously not assumed that the product was necessary for their daily lives.

== See also ==
- Demographic profile
- Market segmentation
- Marketing strategy
- Mass market
- Niche market
- No Size Fits All: From Mass Marketing to Mass Handselling (book)
- Precision marketing
- Psychographic
- Rifle approach
- Target market
