= Frame of reference (disambiguation) =

A frame of reference consists of an abstract coordinate system and the set of physical reference points.

Frame of reference or reference frame may also refer to:

- Linguistic frame of reference
- Frame of reference (marketing), a phrase used to identify how a new product, service, or concept is consciously placed within a marketplace
- Reference frame (video), frames of a compressed video that are used to define future frames
- Frames of Reference, 1960 educational film
- The Common Frame of Reference used by the European Union in developing a single European civil code

== See also ==
- Framing (disambiguation)
