= Immersion marketing =

Integrated promotional strategy

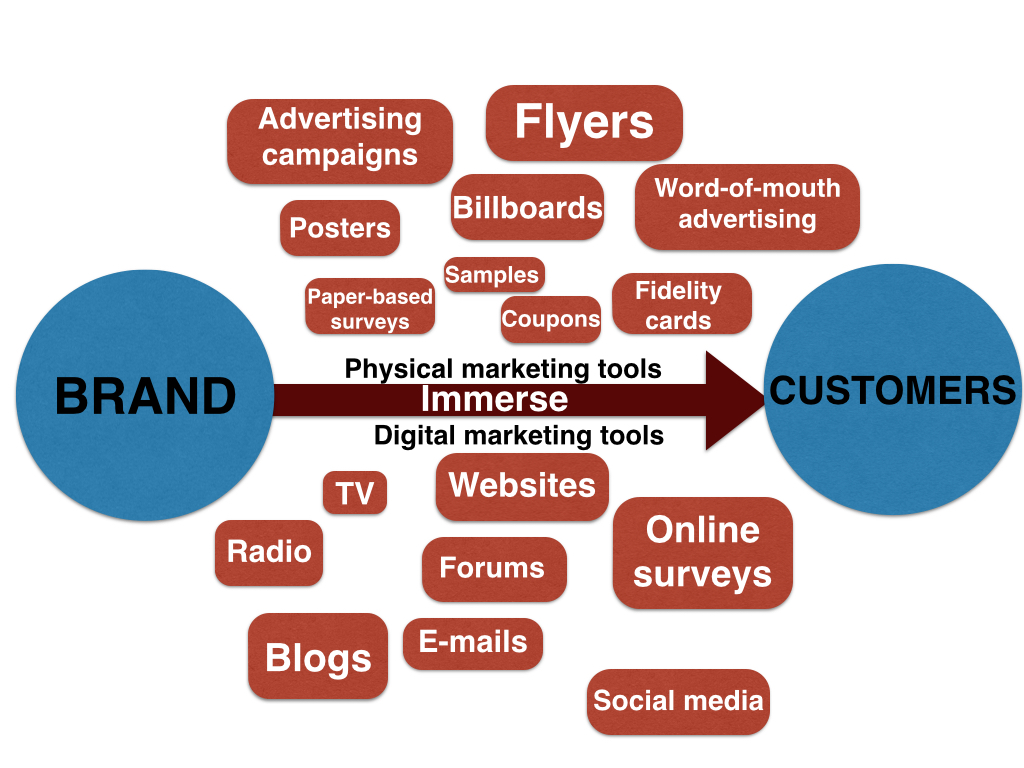

The term immersion marketing or immersive marketing includes traditional advertising, public relations, word-of-mouth advertising, digital marketing, samples, coupons, retail partnerships and other ways of surrounding the consumer with a consistent message about a brand. Immersion marketing envelopes a brand or product or company issue so the marketing, advertising, and public relations departments or representatives work holistically towards delivering the same brand message across multiple distribution channels. Unlike "Shotgun marketing" (communicate the message to anyone who listens), immersive marketing is cheaper and more effective, focusing directly on the customer's needs.

Immersion marketing or immersive marketing succeeds engagement marketing, the difference being a huge emphasis on enveloping consumers in the brand. Therefore, Shar Van Boskirk of Forrester Research characterizes it as "a cohesive and all-encompassing experience across any channel where the customer is."

Event Magazine listed immersion marketing as one of its top trends advertisers must use in 2015.

== Approach to customers ==
In comparison to traditional forms of marketing, the immersive marketing methods are distinctly passive. The customer is invited in a friendly environment (e.g. retail store) instead of being aggressively forced to do so. The idea is to encourage customers to engage in a two-way interaction with the brand. Therefore, instead of being passive aggressive, the marketers must be aggressively passive in their approach in order to succeed attracting consumers.

According to TBA's managing director, Guy Horner, the consumers tend to prefer this type of approach "It comes down to creating engaging brand experiences that connect with consumers. The growth area is engagement and immersion, bringing the brand world to life," he says.

== Focus on the message ==
Immersion marketing is about delivering a message on various media channels, but in order to be taken in consideration, the message has to be consistent and the same among all the channels. The message must be as simple as possible and it should fill the needs of the market which is addressed to. Even if the message is delivered through radio, television, social media, flyers, coupons, samples, posters or phone calls, the consumers should get, subconsciously, the same idea from it. In other words, all of the exposures should be retrieved as one total experience.

When creating a message that will be delivered on a wide range of marketing channels, the brand should think of two aspects:

- What are we good at?
- What does the market need?

== Immersive market research ==
Immersive market research techniques help the companies understand the behaviors and perceptions at the time the consumers face them. The companies use them in the following circumstances:

- When they need to understand how, when and why the customers use their products
- When they want to address to other segments than the targeted one
- When they need new ideas from their customers
- When they need to know whether their services are satisfying or not
- When they cannot rely on past experiences

== Types of market research ==
=== Ethnography ===
Employees conducting this type of research should spend time with customers, being immersed in their daily life.

=== Netnography ===
Netnography is the same thing as ethnography, but it is conducted online. It analyses the consumer's life through blogs, forums, social media and other online contents.

=== Participant reporting ===
The alternative to both ethnography and netnography is to ask customers to conduct researches on the company's behalf. This can be done traditionally, by completing a diary, or it may be used the TROI(Touchpoint Return On Investment) method, in which the customers notify the company whenever they encounter the brand. The point is to study the customer's experience without the work of a researcher.

== Example of immersion marketing ==
An immersion marketing campaign should have a strong message exposed on various marketing channels across a certain place or target. Therefore, let's choose the motto of the brand as message, a residential complex for location and the residents as targeted customers. In this case, the marketing actions will be the following:

- Place a billboard at the entrance in the residential complex
- Buy ad space on the TVs located in the receptions of each building
- Buy ad space on the TVs located in the gym
- Buy ad space on the elevator in each building
- Give coupons branded with the company's name
- Send promotional e-mails to all the residents
- Send catalogues to residents
- Send brochures to residents

This type of brand awareness will be much more effective than the traditional methods. Therefore, the company will benefit from major exposure to the residents.

== See also ==
- Rifle approach
