= Recto Avenue =

Major road in Manila, Philippines

Coordinates: 14°36′17″N 120°58′39″E

C-1

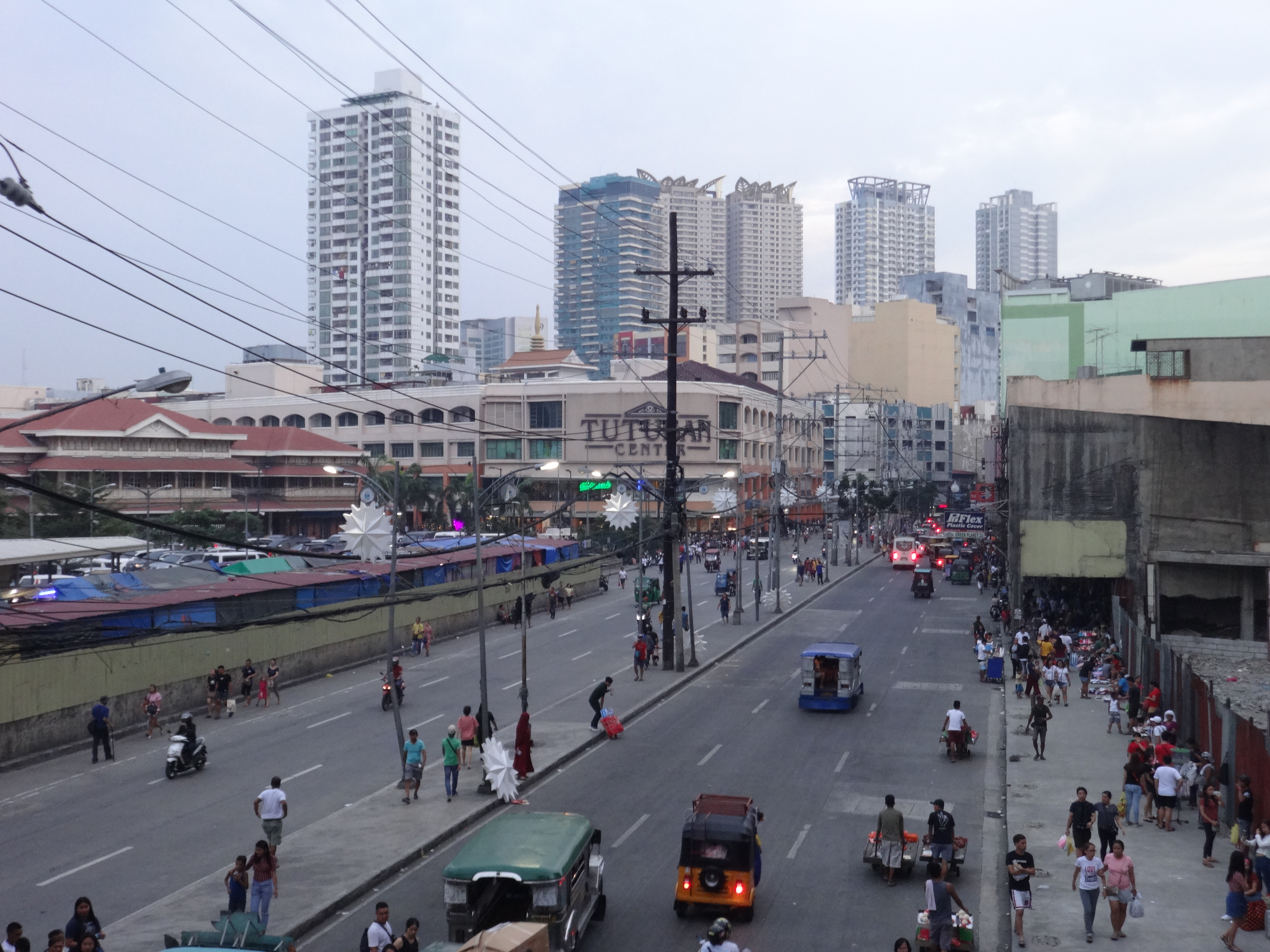
- Recto Avenue looking eastbound near Tutuban Center

- The route of Recto Avenue in Metro Manila. Recto Avenue is highlighted in red.
- Former names: Paseo de Azcárraga; Paseo de Rey Felipe 2° Azcarraga Street (until 1961); Claro M. Recto Street (1961)
- Part of: N145; C-1 C-1
- Namesake: Claro M. Recto; Marcelo Azcárraga Palmero (formerly); Philip II of Spain (formerly)
- Length: 3.2 km (2.0 mi)
- Location: Manila
- West end: AH 26 (N120) (Mel Lopez Boulevard) in Tondo and San Nicolas
- Major junctions: Juan Luna Street; N151 (Abad Santos Avenue); N150 (Rizal Avenue); N170 (Quezon Boulevard)
- East end: N180 (Legarda Street) in Sampaloc and Quiapo

Claro M. Recto Avenue, more popularly known as simply Recto, is the principal commercial thoroughfare in north-central Manila, Philippines. It spans six districts just north of the Pasig River in what is generally considered Manila's old downtown area.

Recto's western terminus is at an intersection with Mel Lopez Boulevard (Radial Road 10) at the district boundaries of Tondo and San Nicolas, close to the Manila North Harbor. It runs northeast before curving east at Juan Luna Street and Estero de Binondo. It then passes through the Divisoria shopping area of Manila south of the Tutuban railway station until it curves southeast past the A. Rivera Street junction. East of Rizal Avenue and Santa Cruz district, Recto intersects with the streets of the University Belt area of Quiapo and Sampaloc before terminating at Legarda Street and Mendiola Street at the district boundaries of Quiapo and Sampaloc.

The LRTA's Line 2 runs along its T. Alonzo–Legarda Street segment. It has a short extension into San Miguel and towards Malacañang Palace compound as Mendiola Street.

== History ==
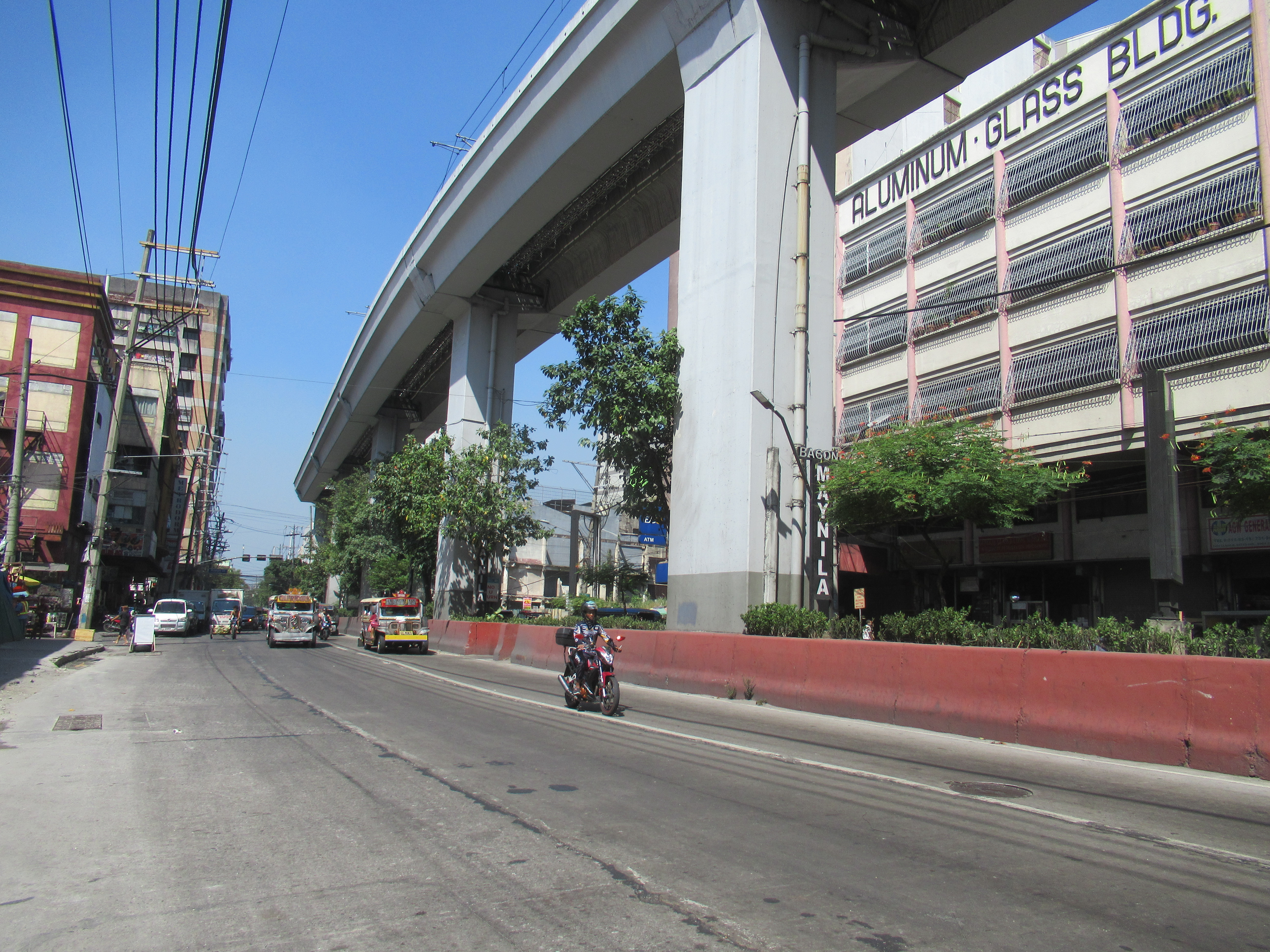
Recto Avenue just west of Rizal Avenue in Santa Cruz

What is known today as Recto Avenue was developed in sections during Spanish rule. The main section leading to the coast in San Nicolas and Tondo from Binondo was named Paseo de Azcárraga, after the Spanish Filipino Prime Minister of Spain, Marcelo Azcárraga.

In the Santa Cruz district, the road was divided into Calle General Izquierdo, Calle Paz and Calle Bilibid after the Spanish Governor-General Rafael Izquierdo y Gutiérrez and the creeks (esteros) that ran through the district, respectively. In Sampaloc, the road was named Calle Iris, which terminated at Calle Alix/Plaza Santa Ana (now Legarda Street). The name Paseo de Azcárraga was extended to include the full length of the street, which was, at one point, also called Paseo de Rey Felipe 2° after King Philip II of Spain.

On July 7, 1892, at 72 Calle Azcárraga, at the intersection with Calle Sagunto (now Santo Cristo) in Tondo, Andrés Bonifacio founded the revolutionary society Katipunan.

In the early 1900s, Azcárraga was a theater-and-restaurant row, with Teatro Libertad and Zorrilla Theatre attracting the well-dressed crowd to zarzuela shows and operas that ran on weekends. The section extending westward from Tutuban station used to be traversed by an old Manila Railroad branch leading to the Port of Manila. The section extending eastward from Calle Santo Cristo was traversed by the tranvía.

Originally terminating at Calle Angngalo (Angalo) on the former coastline of Manila in San Nicolas at the west, Azcárraga was extended into the new reclamation accommodated for the Manila North Harbor in the 20th century. There were also plans to extend Azcárraga eastward to Santa Mesa; however, this extension was never realized. The street was later extended westward to Del Pan Street. On February 17, 1961, Azcárraga Street was officially renamed Claro M. Recto Street under Manila City Ordinance No. 4377, in honor of Filipino senator Claro Mayo Recto, who died in October 1960. It was reclassified as an avenue upon the approval of Manila City Ordinance No. 4441 on October 2, 1961. Following the creation of reclaimed land for the Manila North Harbor, the avenue was extended westward to Marcos Road (now part of Radial Road 10 and known as Mel Lopez Boulevard).

Construction of the LRT Line 2 viaduct, initially traversing Recto Avenue's center island from T. Alonzo Street eastwards, began in 1997. Train operations on the Recto segment began in 2004.

== Cultural references ==
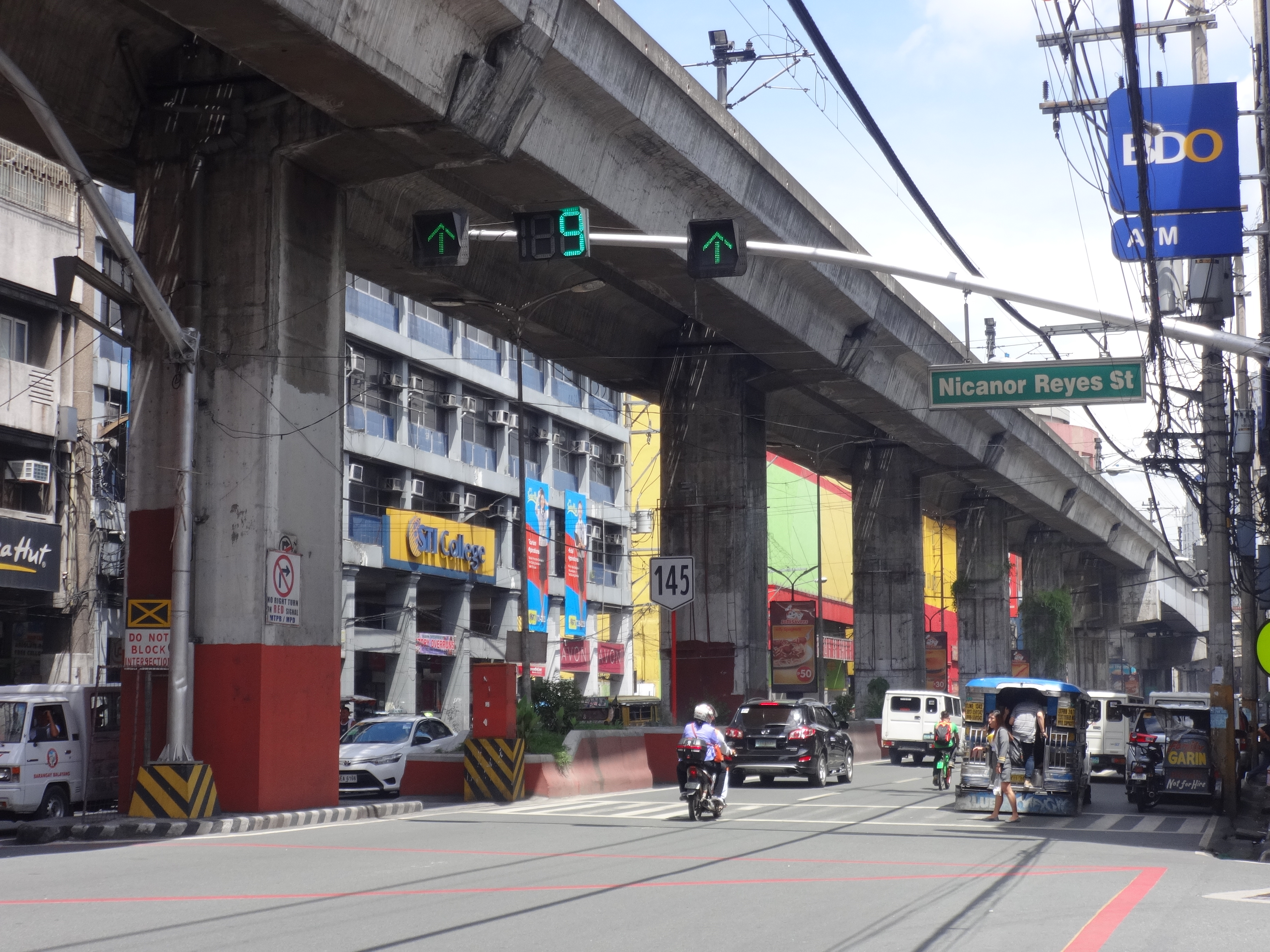
Recto Avenue corner Nicanor Reyes (Morayta) Street

Recto Avenue is infamous as a center of document forgery. Counterfeiters openly advertise their services, although the actual counterfeiting is done elsewhere. The forged documents they sell include IDs, receipts, driver's licenses, diplomas, employment references, theses, pilot's licenses, and seaman's certificates. Due to this, locals have sarcastically dubbed the area "Recto University" or say “Gawang Recto” if something is fake or shady. The mayors of Manila have ordered several police raids in the area; however, some police officers have reportedly accepted bribes from the counterfeiters.

== Transportation ==
Recto Avenue is a major stop on three lines of the Metro Manila Transit System: Doroteo Jose station of LRTA Line 1 at Rizal Avenue, Recto station of LRTA Line 2 at Rizal Avenue, and Tutuban railway station of the Philippine National Railways at Dagupan Street.

Several bus companies and jeepneys also serve the route. As part of the Line 2 west expansion project, additional stations will be built along the road.

== Intersections ==
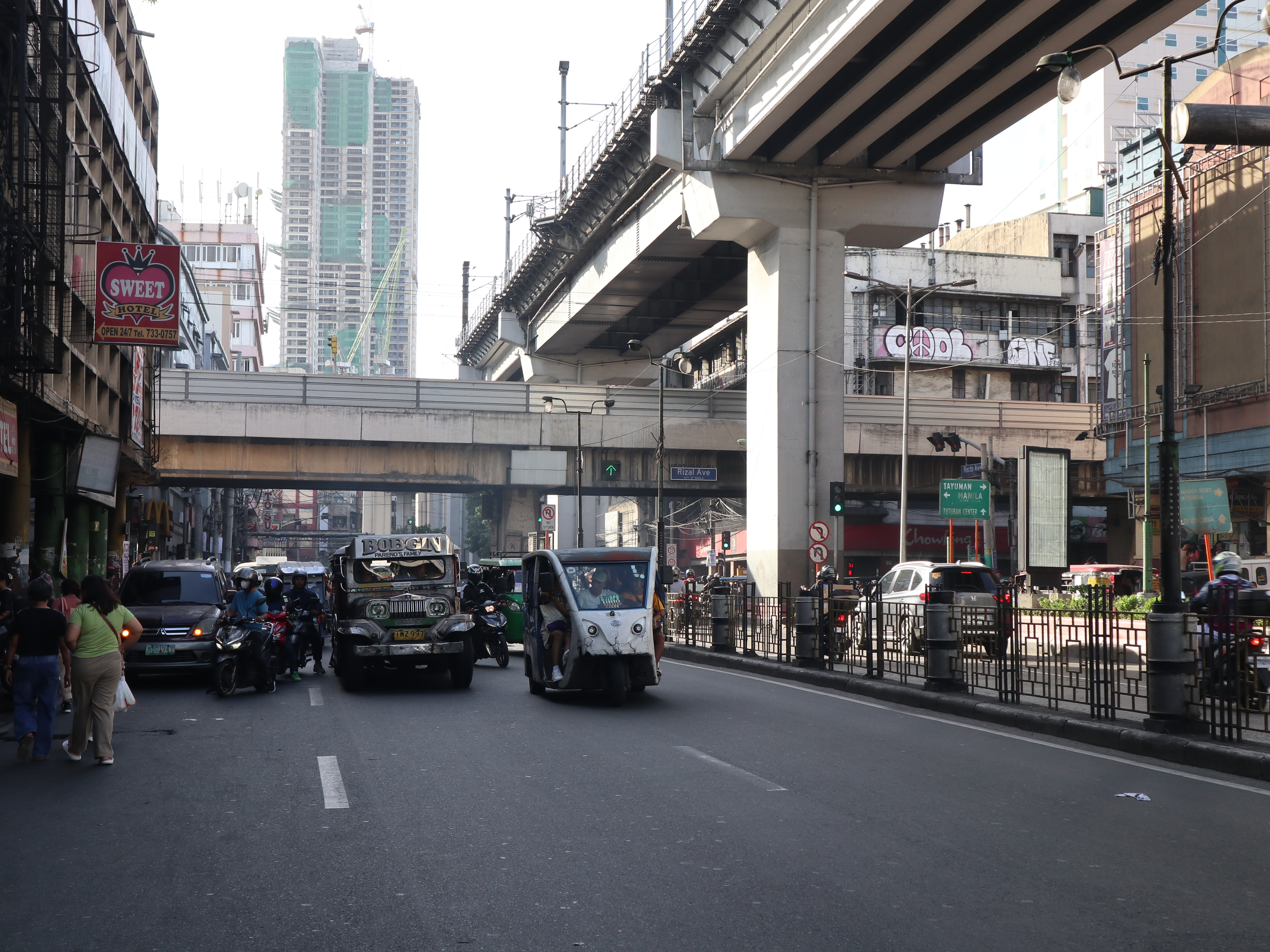
Recto Avenue corner Rizal Avenue

The entire route is located in Manila.

km	mi	Destinations	Notes
		N180 (Legarda Street)	Eastern terminus. Continues east as Mendiola Street. Access to San Miguel district & Malacañang Palace; Nagtahan Interchange & Rizal Park via Legarda Street.
		San Sebastian Street	One-way road.
		Sergio H. Loyola Street	Traffic light intersection.
		Matapang Street	Eastbound only.
		Nicanor Reyes (Morayta) Street	Traffic light intersection. Access to N170 (España Boulevard) & Welcome Rotonda.
		Severino Street	Eastbound only.
		Coromina Street	Eastbound only
		N170 (Quezon Boulevard)	Diamond interchange. No access on opposite sides of the road.
		Evangelista Street	One-way to Recto Avenue; eastbound only.
		Calero Street	One-way from Recto Avenue; eastbound only.
		Oroquieta Road	One-way from Recto Avenue; westbound only. Access to LRT-1 Doroteo Jose station. Various provincial buses have terminals near this vicinity.
		N150 (Rizal Avenue)	Traffic light intersection. Southbound goes to Intramuros, Ermita & Manila City Hall; Northbound goes to Monumento & Grace Park in Caloocan.
		Florentino Torres Street	One-way to Recto Avenue; Eastbound only.
		Tomás Mapúa Street	Traffic light intersection. One-way only.
		San Bernardo Street	Eastbound only.
		Severino Reyes Street	Westbound only.
		Teodora Alonzo Street	Traffic light intersection.
		Benavidez Street	Traffic light intersection. One-way only.
		Masangkay Street	Traffic light intersection. One-way only.
		Aguilar Street	Opposite segments accessible via nearby roads.
		Sanchez Street	One way from Recto Avenue; eastbound only.
		N151 (Abad Santos Avenue) / Reina Regente Street	Traffic light intersection. Northbound goes to Tondo, Monumento & Camanava area via N150 (Rizal Avenue); southbound goes to Plaza Ruiz & Manila City Hall via Jones Bridge.
		Narra Street	Westbound only.
		Antonio Rivera Street	Westbound only.
		Roman Street	Eastbound only.
		Bonifacio Drive	Westbound only. Access to Tutuban Center & PNR Tutuban station.
		Soler Street / Dagupan Street	Unsignaled intersection.
		Juan Luna Street	Access to opposite segments via nearby roads.
		Ilaya Street	Access to opposite segments via nearby roads.
		Tabora Street	Eastbound only.
		Carmen Planas Street	Access to opposite segments via nearby roads.
		Sto. Cristo Street	Unsignaled intersection.
		Elcano Street	Access to opposite segments via nearby roads.
		Asuncion Street	Unsignaled intersection.
		Saint Mary Street / Camba Street	
		Angalo Street	Accessible only to bicycles, motorcycles, pedicabs & pedestrians.
		Sevilla Street	
		AH 26 (N120) (Mel Lopez Boulevard) / Delpan Street / MICT Access Road	Western terminus. Unsignaled intersection. Southwest road continues to the Manila International Container Terminal (MICT). Northbound goes to Malabon & Navotas, southbound goes to Intramuros & Ermita districts.
1.000 mi = 1.609 km; 1.000 km = 0.621 mi: Incomplete access

== Landmarks ==
Crowded Recto Avenue with 168 Shopping Mall in the background

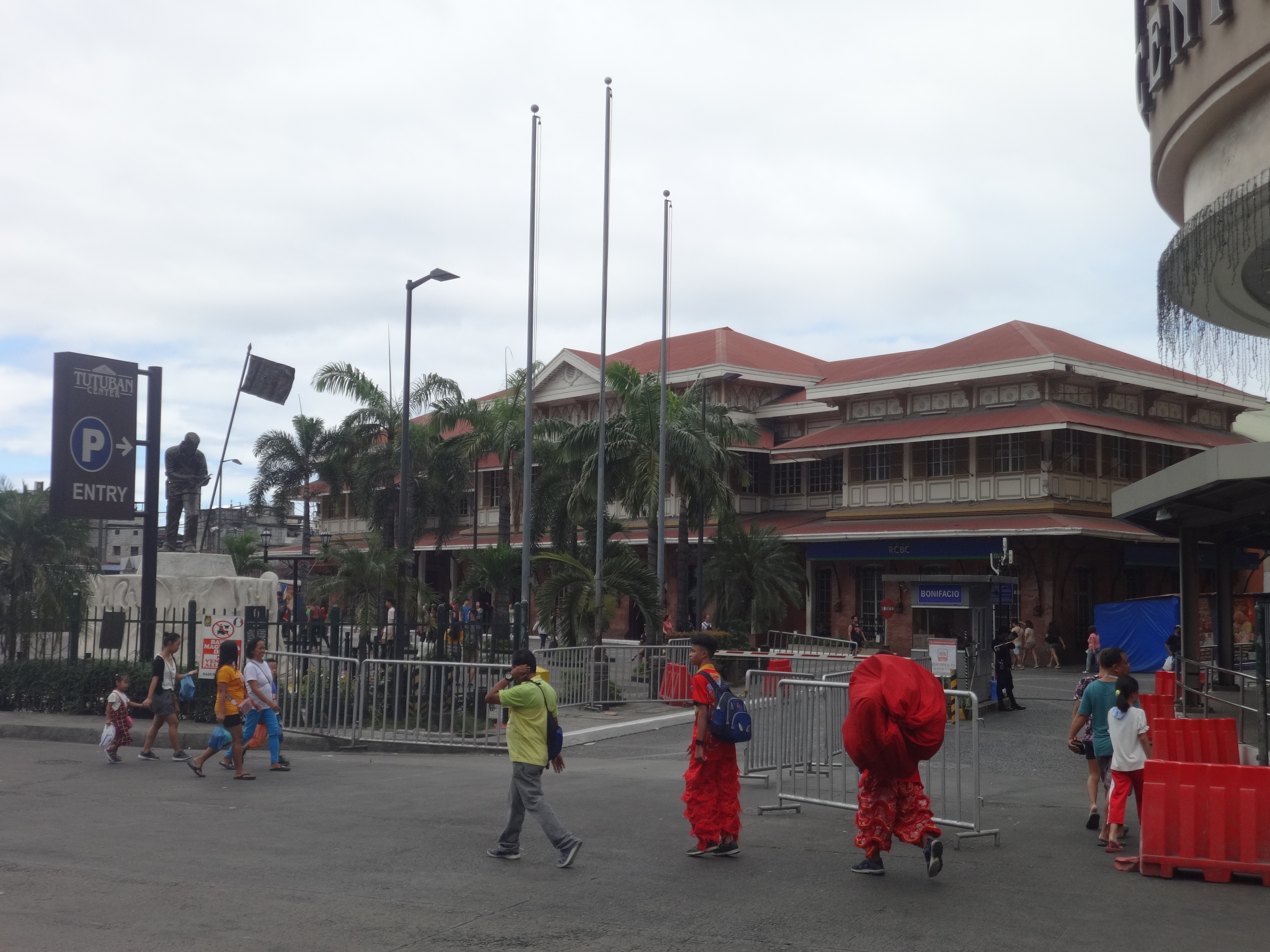
Tutuban Center

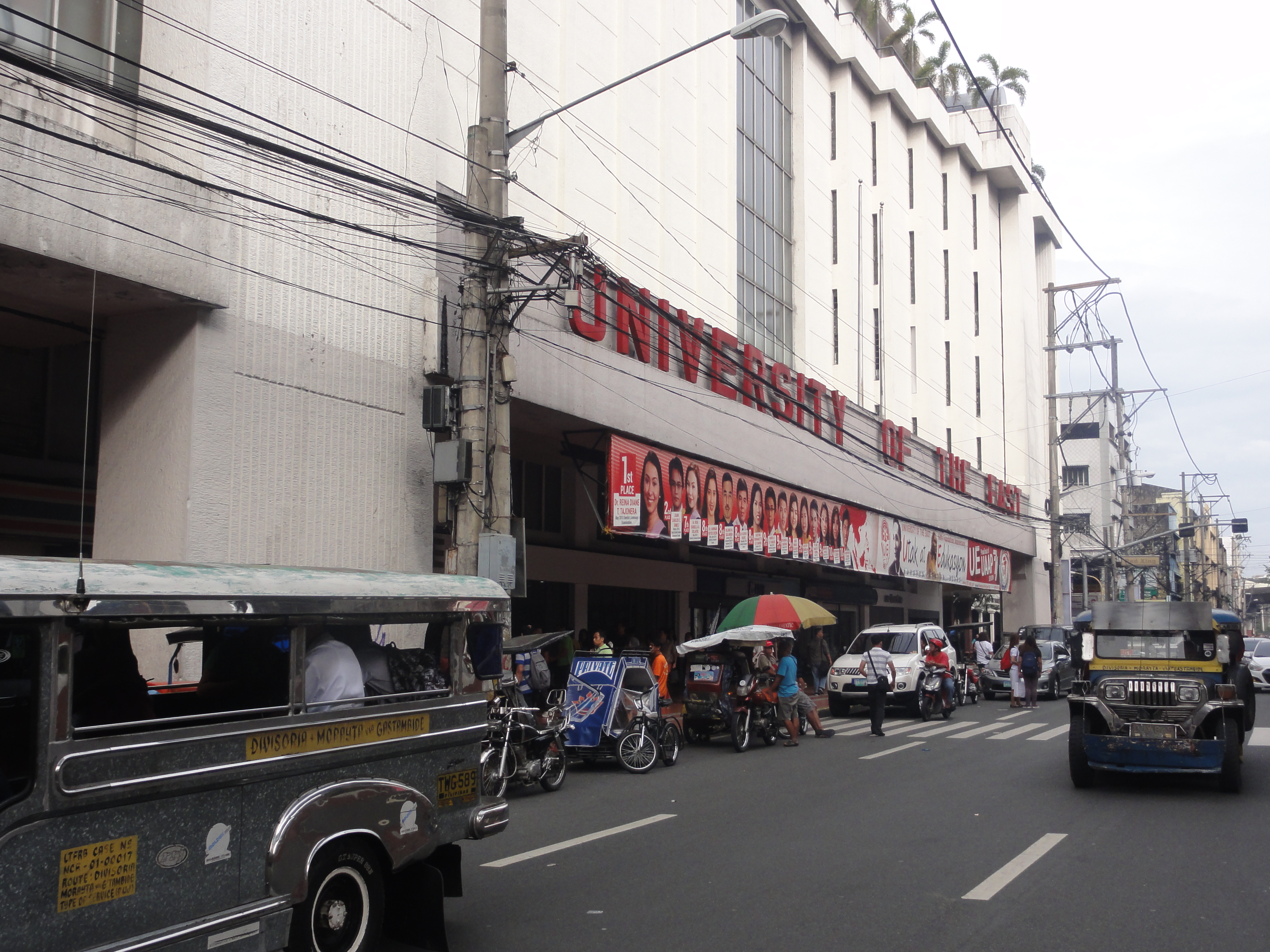
University of the East main building on Recto Avenue

This is listed from the west end at Mel Lopez Boulevard, to the east end at Legarda Street.

- Manila International Container Terminal
- Dragon8 Shopping Mall
- 168 Shopping Mall
- Tutuban Center
- 999 Shopping Mall
- General Gregorio del Pilar Elementary School
- Recto station
- Isetann Cinerama Recto
- Philippine College of Health Sciences
- Informatics College - Recto
- STI Colleges Recto
- University of the East
- San Sebastian College – Recoletos

== See also ==
- List of renamed streets in Manila
