= 168 Shopping Mall =

- Location: 918 Soler St, Binondo, Manila, Philippines
- Coordinates: 14°36′17″N 120°58′20″E
- Opened: September 2005; 21 years ago
- Developer: Yeeloofa Development Corporation
- Manager: Basillo Tan
- Owner: 168 Group of Companies
- Num. of stores: 300+
- Num. of anchor tenants: 2
- Floors: Soler and Santa Elena Wings: 3 Soler-Recto Wing: 7 (including the basement level)
- Public transit: Future: Tutuban
- Website: www.168shoppingmall.com

168 Shopping Mall (Chinese: 一路發商場; Pe̍h-ōe-jī: It-lō͘-hoa̍t siong-tiûⁿ) is a shopping complex in Binondo, Manila, the Chinatown of the Philippines. The three-story complex, housing over 500 tenants, is located along St. Elena and Soler Streets just south of Recto Avenue and Divisoria. It is owned and managed by the 168 Group of Companies. Before the opening of the Lucky Chinatown Mall in 2012, 168 Shopping Mall was considered one of the most visited malls in the area. Some of its close competitors are the 11/88 Mall, the 999 Mall, and the Lucky Chinatown Mall.

It is still one of the common destinations when shopping for bargain goods and other commodities, from novelty items, bags, shoes, toys, hardware, RTW's, and others.

== History ==
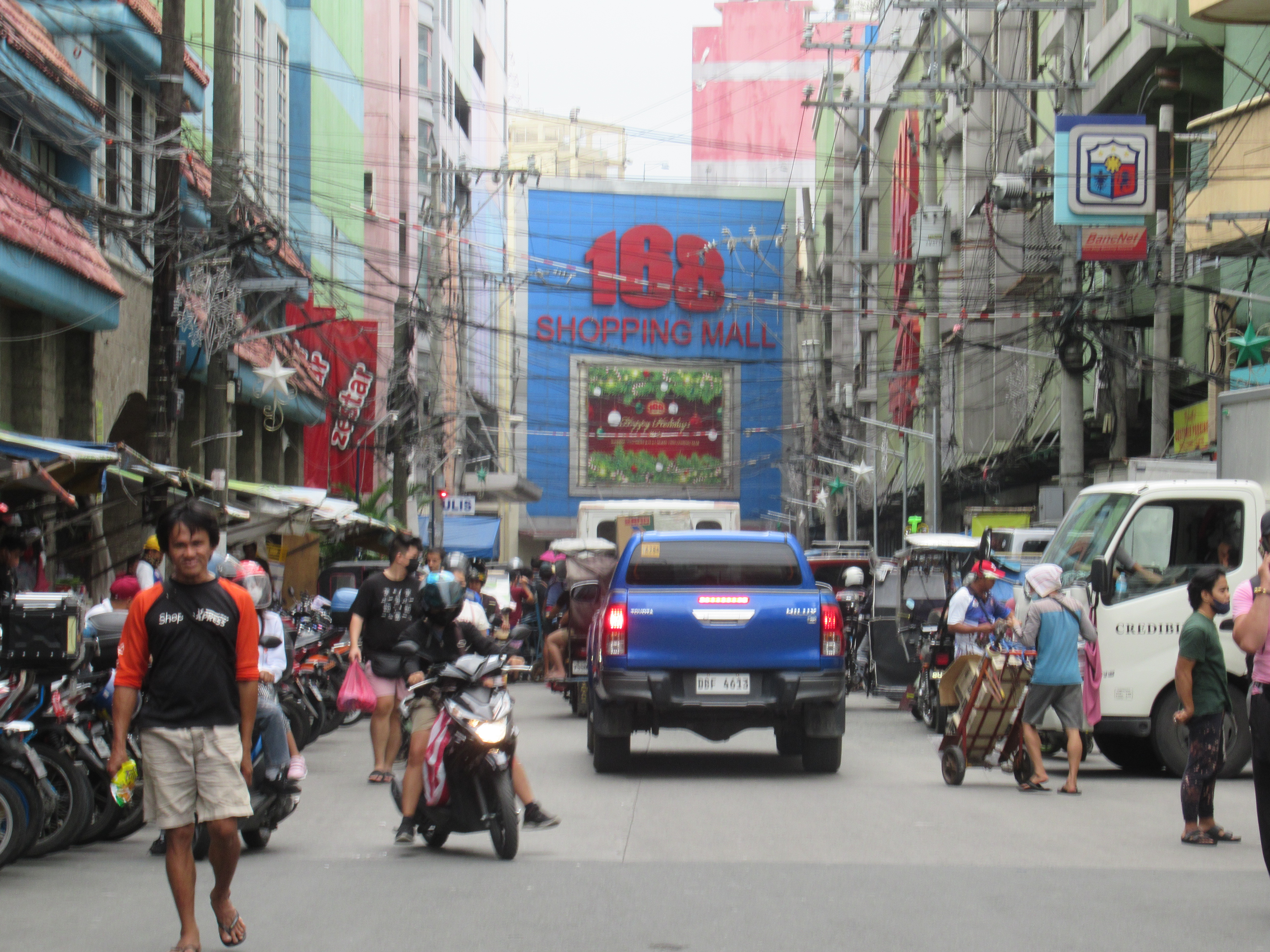
View of mall entrance from Felipe II st.

The mall began its operations in September 2005 and was developed by the Yeeloofa Development Corporation (YDC), costing around 250 million pesos. Being developed by the 168 Group of Companies (168 GoC), the 168 Shopping Mall is only one of many buildings managed and constructed by the group. In recent years, Phase 2 of the mall was built to accommodate the need for extra space due to the overcrowding in Phase 1 and the need for space for tenants.

== Tenants ==
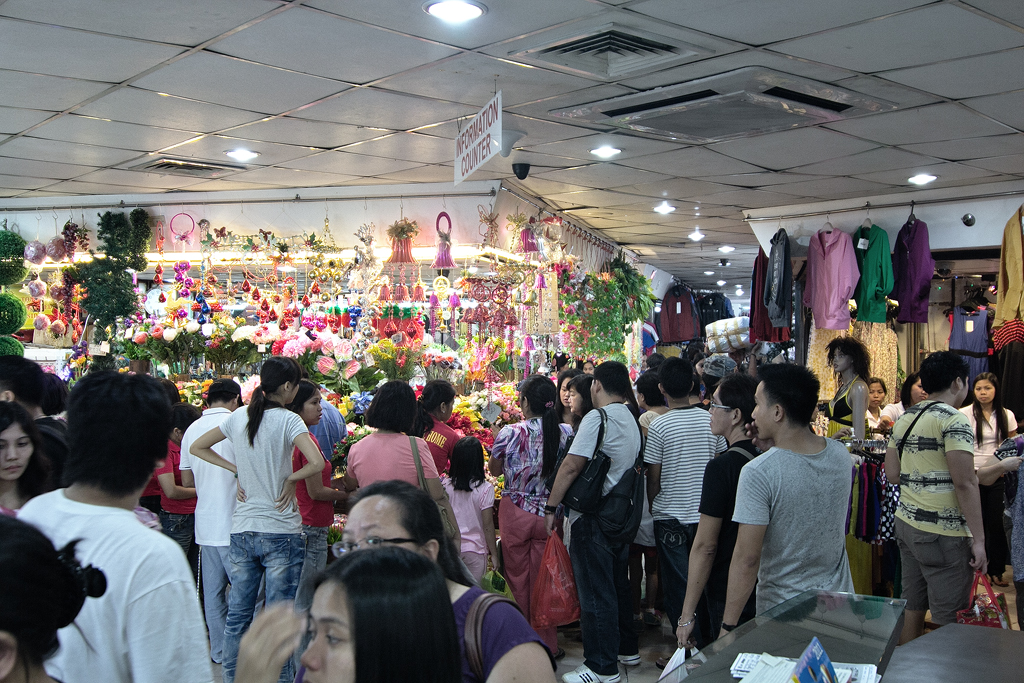
The common scene inside the mall.

Located on the first level are some banks, such as Security Bank and BDO, and some men's and women's apparel and accessories boutiques.

A Robinsons Supermarket branch is located at the lower ground level.

Continuing the trend of the boutiques, infant's and children's toys, apparel and accessories can be found throughout the succeeding levels; gifts and decorations, as well as some food stalls, can be found here. Food courts can befound on the third and fifth levels.

A subsidiary of the 168 Group of Companies, the 168 Department Store, is located within the mall complex.
