= Philippine College of Health Sciences =

Private college in Manila, Philippines

- Motto: Equal Opportunity for All
- Type: Private
- Established: February 1, 1993; 33 years ago
- President-Chief Executive Officer: Dr. George Cordero
- Location: Manila, Metro Manila, Philippines; 14°36′12″N 120°59′07″E
- Campus: Claro M. Recto Avenue
- Hymn: PCHS Hymn
- Colors: Green and Gold
- Website: pchsmanila.edu.ph//
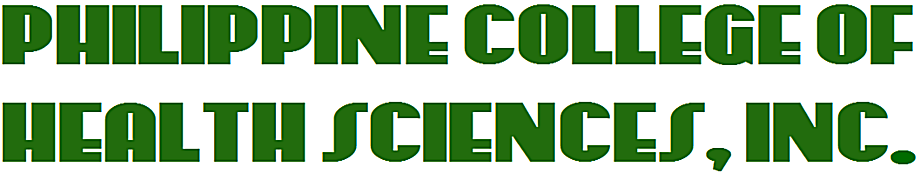

- Location in Manila Location in Metro Manila Location in Luzon Location in the Philippines

The Philippine College of Health Sciences, Inc. (PCHS) is a private school located at 1813 Recto Avenue in Manila, Philippines. It was founded in 1993 by Dr. George Cordero.

== History ==
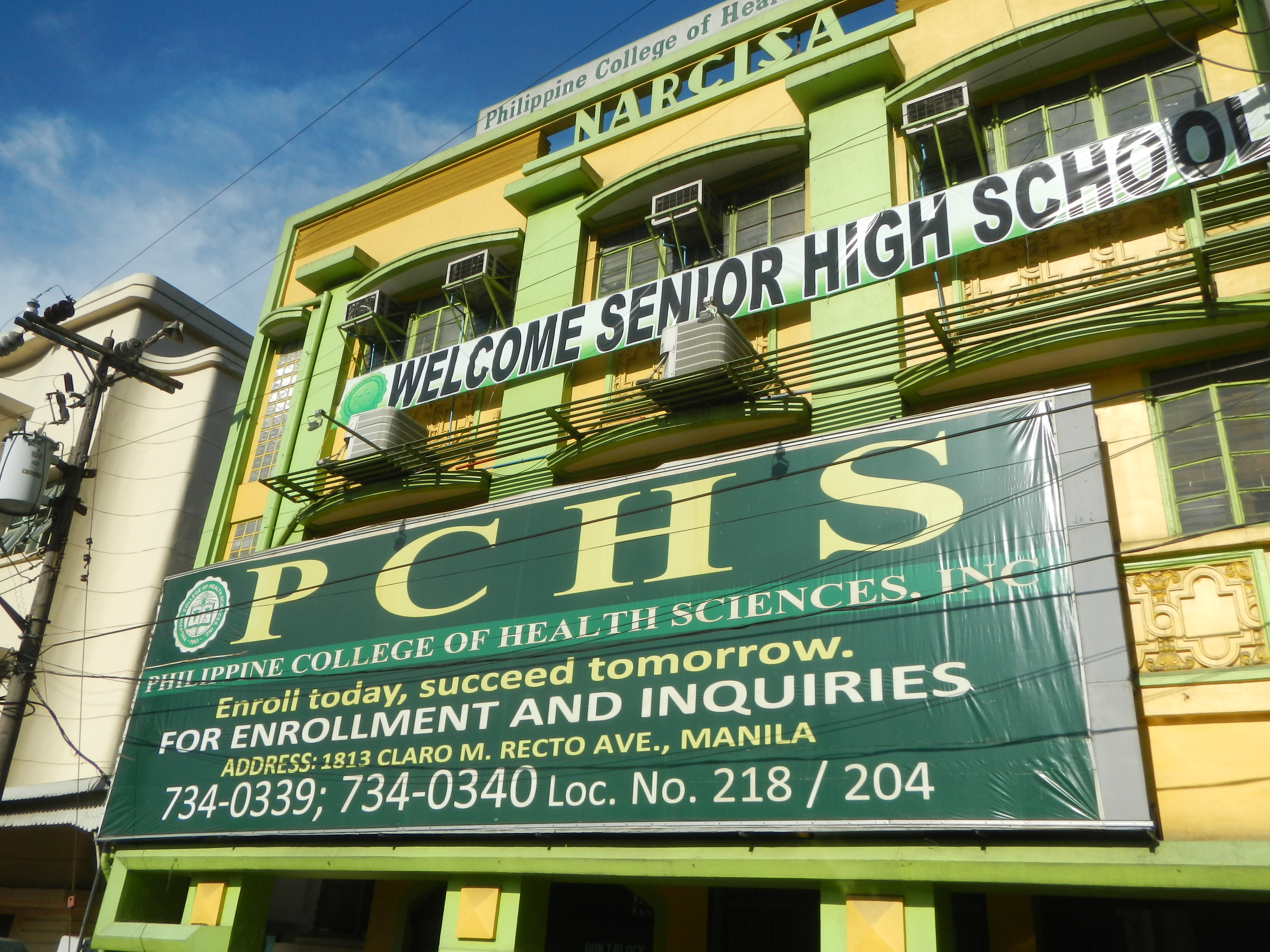
Doña Narcisa Building

PCHS was created on February 1, 1993, the birthday of its first President and chief executive officer (CEO), Dr. George C. Cordero.

The School was conceived as complementary to Dr. Cordero's review center, the Institute of Review and Special Studies, popularly known as the INRESS REVIEW Center. The first PCHS location was a 3-story rented building with 10 classrooms, which was located on Coromina St., along Claro M. Recto Avenue, Manila. Dr. Cordero was appointed as president in 1996.

PCHS commenced operations in June 1994 with 124 students. The first baccalaureate courses it offered were in Nursing, in Physical Therapy, Occupational Therapy, Radiologic Technology and Psychology. The school began offering associate degrees in Radiologic Rechnology (A.R.T) and Graduate in Midwifery (G.M). Its post-graduate courses include Master of Arts in nursing (M.A.N), Master of Arts in education (M.A.E.d), Master of Public Administration (M.P.A), Doctor of Education (Ed.D.) and Doctor of Philosophy (PhD). In the following years its student population exceeded one thousand, and it almost reached three thousand student enrollments.

Dr. Cordero transferred to his newly acquired building, the Doña Narcisa Building, along Quezon Boulevard. PCHS is trying to purchase the defunct College of Holy Spirit in Mendiola for a more spacious campus.

== Physical / Clinical Resources ==
PCHS is affiliated with the following major institutions for clinical education:

- V. Luna (Armed Forces of the Philippines) Medical Center
- Veterans Memorial Medical Center
- Quirino Memorial Medical Center
- Quezon City General Hospital
- National Center for Mental Health
- Philippine Orthopedic Center
- San Lazaro Hospital
- Dr. Jose Fabella Memorial Hospital
- Ospital ng Maynila
- Mandaluyong City Medical Center
- Gat. Andres Bonifacio Memorial Medical Center

PCHS is also affiliated with the following health centers for the community involvement of its students:

- Quezon City Health Department
- Manila City Health Department
- San Juan Health Department
- Caloocan Health Department

== Academic Programs ==
The School offers the following programs from Diploma, Bachelor's, Master's, and Doctoral levels:

=== Undergraduate Studies ===
College of Nursing & Midwifery

- Bachelor of Science in Nursing
- Midwifery Course

College of Medical Technology

- Bachelor of Science in Medical Technology

College of Pharmacy

- Bachelor of Science in Pharmacy

College of Radiologic Technology

- Bachelor of Science in Radiologic Technology

College of Rehabilitation Sciences

- Bachelor of Science in Physical Therapy
- Bachelor of Science in Occupational Therapy

College of Criminology

- Bachelor of Science in Criminology

College of Education

- Bachelor of Secondary Education major in:
- Mathematics
- Biological Science
- English
- Bachelor of Elementary Education major in
- Special Education
- Bachelor of Science in Psychology

=== Postgraduate Studies ===
- Master of Arts in Nursing, major in
- Community Health Nursing
- Maternal and Child Nursing
- Mental Health and Psychiatric Nursing
- Medical and Surgical Nursing
- Nursing Administration
- Nursing Education
- Master of Public Administration
- Master of Arts in Education, major in
- English
- Mathematics
- Doctor of Education, major in Educational Management
- Doctor of Philosophy, major in Management
- Doctor of Philosophy, major in Mathematics

== Student Organizations ==
- Philippine Nursing Student Association

== Publications ==
Murmuray Newspaper is the official student publication for the college.
