= Mass market =

Market for goods produced on a large scale for a significant number of end consumers

A mass market is a market for goods produced on a large scale for a significant number of end consumers. A mass market differs from a niche market in that the former focuses on consumers with a wide variety of backgrounds with no identifiable preferences and expectations in a large market segment. Traditionally, businesses reach out to the mass market with advertising messages through a variety of media including radio, TV, newspapers and the Web.

== Definition ==
Scholars have noted that defining the precise nature of the mass market is problematic. This difficulty arises, at least in part, from scholarly attention being given to the process of mass marketing rather than the mass market, per se. In addition, the concept of a mass market means different things in different contexts and has evolved over time, adding yet another layer of complexity. The Cambridge Business English Dictionary defines a mass market as:

a market of as many people as possible, not just people with a lot of money or particular needs or interests [or] a product that is intended to be sold to as many people as possible, not just to people with a lot of money or particular interests.

A mass market, also known as undifferentiated market, is a large group of current and/or prospective customers, where individual members share similar needs. The size of a mass market depends on the product category. Mass marketers typically aim at between 50 and 100 percent of the total market potential. For example, the laundry detergent, Tide, reportedly had a 65% in-store market share (in the US) by developing a “good for everybody” product and targeting a broad middle-class market. By the 1980s, Coca-Cola commanded almost 70% share of the US market Mass market products and brands offer lower acceptable quality, are mass-produced, widely distributed and typically rely on mass media to create high levels of market awareness and ultimately market penetration. A premium brand, in contrast, combines elements of luxury and mass market, appealing to a broad market with higher quality products, often designed by high profile designers, with unique or prestige points of differentiation and offered at reasonable prices. Premium brands offer an alternative to luxury goods.

== History ==
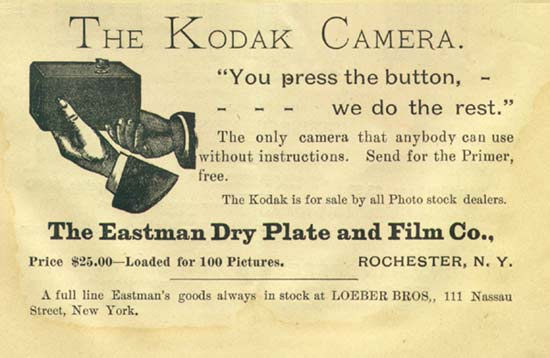
"You Press The Button, We Do the Rest", Kodak's campaign slogan

The concept of a ‘mass market’ is relatively modern. Prior to the Industrial Revolution, a market referred to a physical place (i.e., a marketplace). However, by the late 18th century, people could participate in the market without physically attending a marketplace. By the 20th century, the concept could be used to describe a process (mass production/mass marketing), a group of consumers as well as a physical place. The process, mass marketing, involves the pursuit of an entire market or a large proportion of the market with a single product and a single marketing program. In mass marketing, there is no market differentiation and no product differentiation. .

The term, 'mass market’, emerged in the 19th century and had its origins in social, political and economic transformations occurring across the developed world throughout the 17th, 18th and early 19th centuries. Population growth combined with rising wages, higher standards of living, concentrated populations, increasing urbanisation, increased social mobility and the rise of a middle-class fuelled a rise in demand for goods and services. To meet this demand, industry was restructured: manufacturers needed new production, distribution and merchandising systems to satisfy the growing demand for affordable goods and services. As certain historians have noted, the supply-side 'industrial revolution’ was accompanied by a demand-side 'consumer revolution’.

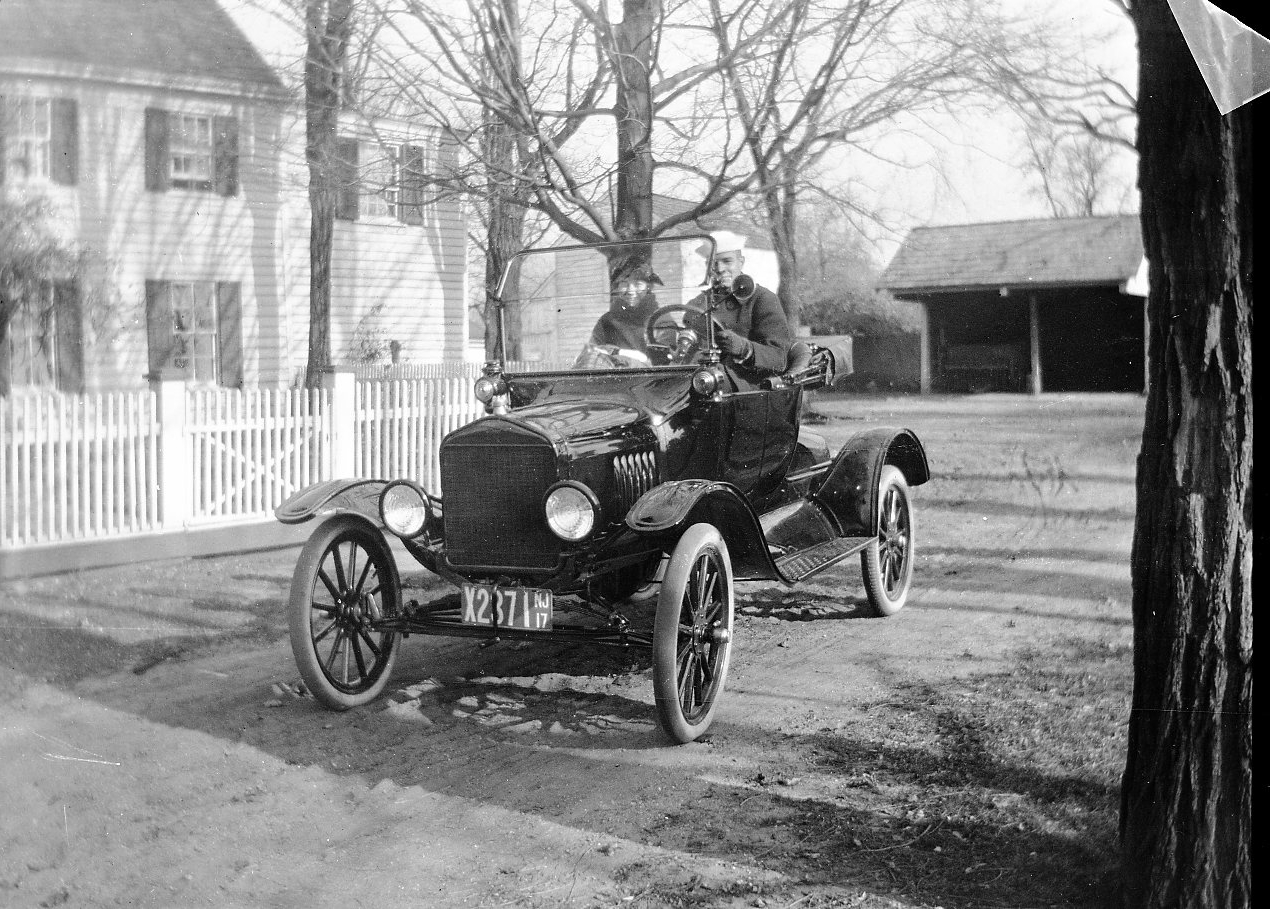
Model-T Ford in 1919

By the 17th century, raw materials, manufactured goods and foodstuffs were being transported around the globe. However, for mass market accessibility, effective domestic transportation and communication systems, such as the railways and the telegraph, were essential preconditions. Scholars point to the second half of the 19th century as a forming a 'revolution in distribution’ with innovations in transportation, storage and packaging enabling rapid, efficient movement of goods across vast distances. Mass production techniques, facilitated by technological developments, enabled the production of low-cost, standardised products designed to appeal to a broad cross-section of the market. By the 20th century, new distribution systems gradually supplanted the peddlers, hawkers and small, independent retailers that had characterised pre-industrial supply channels. As the century progressed, improvements in the supply chain gave rise to a plethora of innovative mass market retailers – from department stores through to franchises and chain stores. Notable early examples of mass marketers include:

- Kodak: George Eastman, who founded Kodak in 1888, revolutionised photography when he developed inexpensive, portable cameras and effectively created a mass market for amateur photographers To highlight the camera's ease of use, the campaign slogan promised, "You press the button, we do the rest" (1888).
- Ford Motor Company: Henry Ford perfected the moving assembly line in order to produce a high-quality automobile (the model T) priced within the reach of a market of unprecedented size.

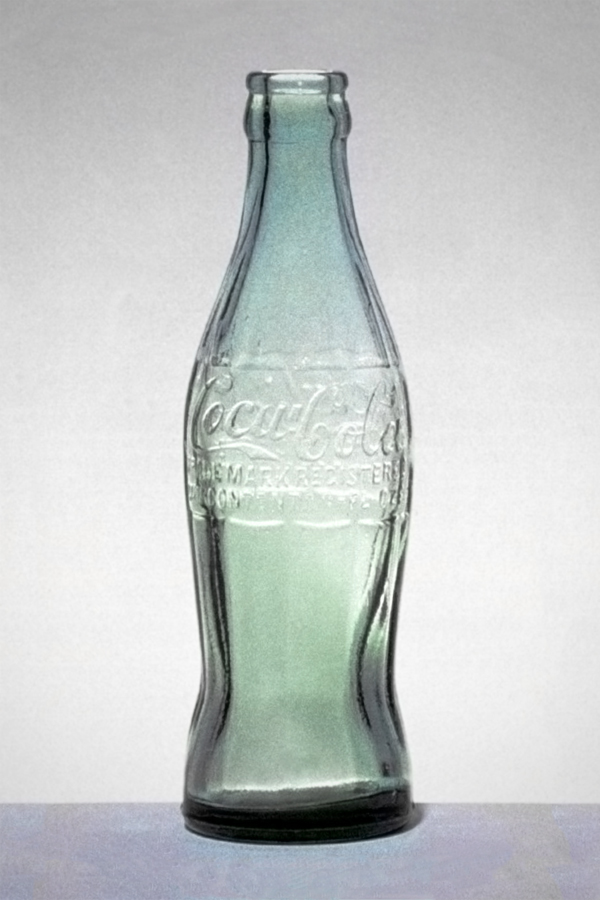
Coca-Cola bottle, 1915

- Coca-Cola: When Asa Candler purchased the Coca-Cola recipe in 1891, his strategy was to mass market the beverage across the US, by producing a single 6.5-ounce bottle in only one flavour. The company made a concerted effort to appeal to every segment of society, using a national distribution system via food retailers (as opposed to the drugstores used during the formative years). At its peak, in the late 1980s, Coca-Cola commanded almost 70 percent market share

== Developed and emerging markets ==
The primary aim of mass marketing is to provide standardised products to the largest number of customers at minimum acceptable quality points and at lowest possible prices. To achieve this, companies design no-frills products, employ long production runs and rely on low margins and volume sales in order to maintain low unit costs.

In the mass market, businesses must compete with other high-volume producers. As a consequence, the product with the lowest price, given comparable acceptable quality, will enjoy a market advantage. This tends to lead to a focus on prices which means that companies must pursue cost savings across every aspect of business operations to retain competitive advantage – simplified product design, streamlined supply chains and minimum tolerable service quality.

In developed nations, marketers create a mass market for goods and services. For example, a sophisticated new product such as an MP3 player, might firstly target early adopters in upper income groups and subsequently simplify the offer and reduce prices in order to gain acceptance by a larger proportion of the potential market. Mass marketing is becoming less common as an approach. However, it remains a vital part of marketing in developed economies well into the 21st century. Mass marketing is often used in commodity markets (e.g., sugar, salt, fruit and vegetables, etc.); very small markets (where segmentation would result in segments too small to be profitable); for products and brands satisfying universal needs (e.g., pens, pencils, newspapers) and in less competitive markets.

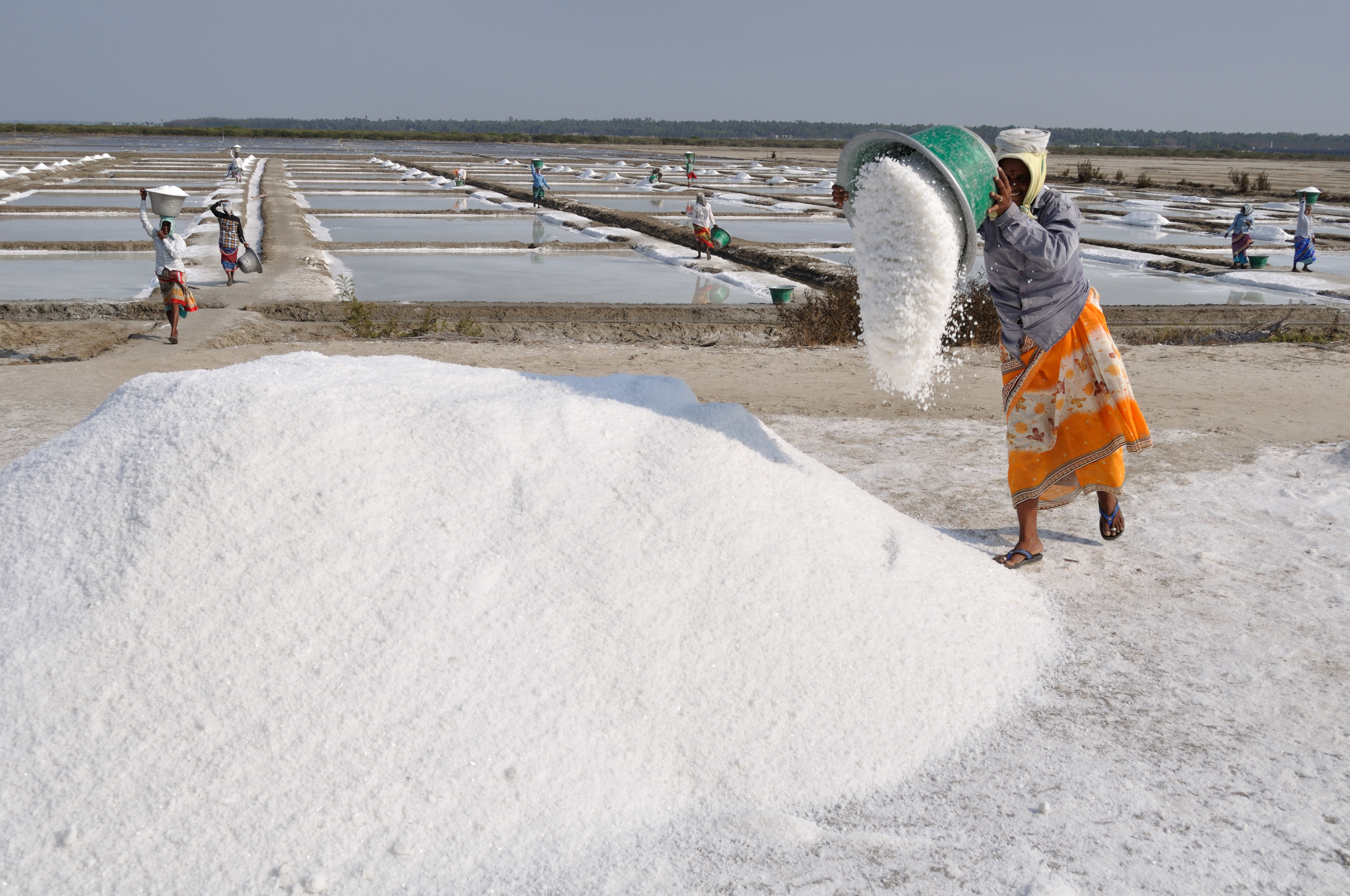
Mass marketing is primarily used in commodity markets. Pictured salt workers of Marakkanam, India.

As markets in the US and Europe have become increasingly fragmented, consumers are exhibiting a greater desire for choice, customisation and product differentiation. This has led to some companies, shifting away from serving a single mass market towards serving a number of smaller markets or segments. However, the size of these segments remains relatively large. Multinationals such as Campbell's and Coca-Cola enjoy enormous reach across global markets. Whereas, Coke, for example, was once only available in a single flavour and bottle size, it is now offered in multitude of different flavours, different sized bottles and with varying sugar- no-sugar options.

Map of E7 – major emerging markets

As growth in developed economies begins to slow, multinational corporations are looking towards emerging markets for new growth and economies of scale. Markets in parts of Asia, Africa, South America and Eastern Europe, with their rapid population growth, youthful populations, growing economies, rising standards of living and emergent middle class can present companies with long-term opportunities.

For companies desirous of entering emerging markets, one business decision to be made is which income segments to target – for example, a small but wealthy elite (niche market) or a large but relatively poor mass market. The resources and capabilities required to compete in emerging economies can be quite different to those used in developed markets. Companies may need local knowledge, such as an understanding of local distribution networks and of consumer purchasing habits.

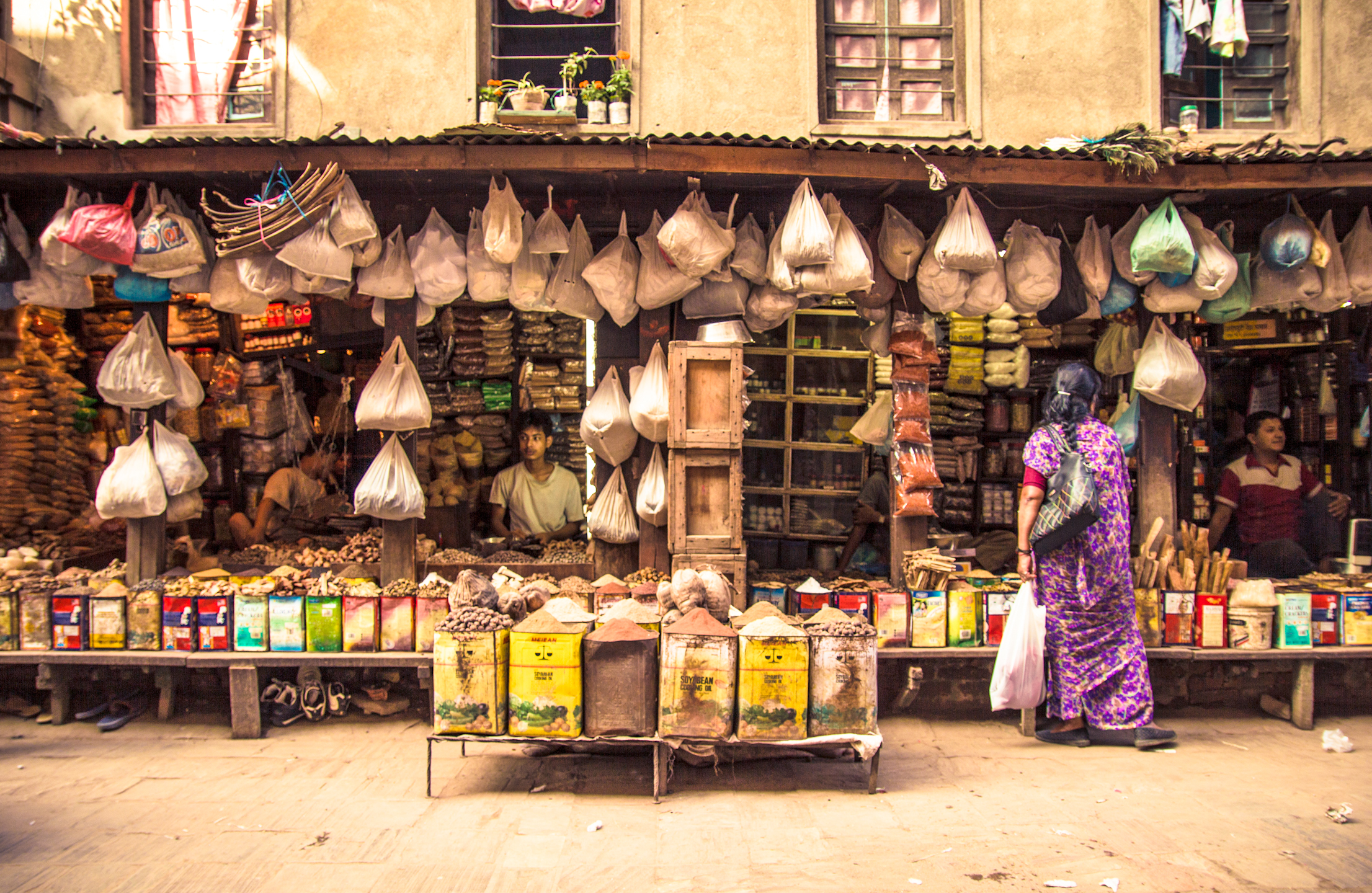
In emerging economies, consumers have a preference for unbranded goods and local markets.

Consumer behaviour in emerging mass markets is quite unlike that observed elsewhere. Mass market needs revolve around basic necessities and functional products. Although regional differences are evident, some commonalities have been noted: consumers are extremely price-conscious; prefer unbranded goods, buy in smaller quantities, only buy sufficient amounts as required for immediate use and often exhibit a preference for local retail outlets where they can buy a single item.

Colgate-Palmolive is one of a number of companies that have successfully tapped into mass markets in emerging economies.

Multinationals such as Unilever and Colgate-Palmolive have successfully tapped into emerging mass markets, while others have struggled. Kellogg's foray into India failed to establish market acceptance for cereal as an alternative breakfast food. Unilever's laundry detergent, Ala, achieved market success in southern Brazil, but was unable to gain a foothold in the northeast, where women continue to wash laundry in streams and have a preference for bar soap. In Paraguay, the telecommunications operator, Tigo, was initially reluctant to reduce the minimum recharge rate for phone cards. However, its sales volume tripled when it allowed users to recharge for just a few centavos. The company learned that customers were using the cards as a form of savings and also made calls at night when rates were lower, thereby boosting off peak usage volumes.

== Retail ==
=== Mass market retailers ===
Mass market retailer

A mass-market retailer is an organization that sells a high volume of products, that appeal to a wide range of buyers. Some examples of mass retailers are big-box stores such as Target, Sam's Club, and Best Buy, as well as brands like Levi Strauss and e-retailers like Amazon. Sometimes operating on small profit margins, such companies are profitable and successful due to economies of scale due to large sales volumes, efficient inventory control and supply chain management. The volume of sales combined with a large produce range allows such companies to offer competitive pricing.

==== Mass market retailers vs luxury retailers ====
In terms of the differences between mass market and luxury retailers, luxury retailers sell their products to specific consumers. Their target market is for wealthy consumers who purchase upscale products frequently, products that tend to be unobtainable for the regular consumer. Some examples of luxury retailers include Barney's, Tiffany's, Saks & Fifth etc.

== Decline ==
Technology platforms have given consumers options to bypass mass-market models to find more specific products.

TV is an effective way to advertise to mass markets. TV shows are made to appeal to whoever wants to tune in and to however many people that attention brings. However, there has been a decline in the number of viewers that the biggest TV shows get, as opposed to in previous years and decades. This decrease is largely attributed to the presence of social media, self-published apps and streaming services like Netflix, Hulu, HBO, etc, which have made TV audiences more fragmented. "Oprah, at her height, had 48 million viewers per week. Now, the biggest daytime TV stars, like Ellen DeGeneres or Dr. Phil, draw less than one-tenth of that per week."

Marketers now have greater ability to target particular market segments, via the internet, allowing them to reach a more defined and effective audience for their product. In addition to being able to target audiences in a more defined way, when advertising to mass markets on the internet, measuring effectiveness by segment is possible, which may reduce the need to advertise some products to a broad mass market on a continual basis.

Other examples that demonstrate businesses moving away from mass market strategies, include restaurant chains creating localised pricing (and menu options) based on local demand, businesses such as hotel chains (or supermarkets) creating and growing a loyalty program to tailor offers and rewards based on individual customer data and food manufacturers creating specific foods, to targeting particular consumer segments.

== See also ==
- Big-box store
- Luxury Retailers
- Mass behavior
- Mass customization
- Mass consumption (aka "consumerism")
- Mass marketing
- Mass media
- Mass merchandiser
- Mass movement
- Mass production
- The masses
- Niche market
