= Rifle approach =

Rifle approach is a marketing strategy defined area or subject in order to achieve (hit) a clearly defined objective or target. The principle is to with one shot identify the best geographical area to enter and concentrating efforts there in the same manner as a rifle shot hits the centre of the target with great force.

== One to One Marketing ==
One to one marketing is targeting a specific audience and carrying out marketing strategies. Some trends emerging in the 21st century support the ongoing growth of one to one marketing.

- The mass marketing of yesteryear is no longer relevant.
- More direct and personal marketing better meets the needs of the customers who have less time to spend making purchase decisions.
- Consumers will more loyal to companies who reinforce their loyalty at every purchase occasion. These techniques focus on finding a firm's best customers and rewarding them for loyalty.
- Mass-media approaches are declining as advances in database technology enable collection of detailed information on customers.

== Benefits of Rifle Approach (Market Segmentation) ==
Rifle marketing first identifies the target customers within a market and has its benefits like :

- By tailoring programs to individual segments, marketers can make efficient use of marketing resources. They are not wasting resources chasing customers whose needs would not be satisfied.
- A small firm with limited resources can compete very effectively in one or two market segments, whereas the firm would be stretched very thinly if it tries to cater to the entire market.
- By using product segmentation, companies can design products that closely match the needs of particular groups.
- Advertising media can be more effectively used because promotional messages and the media chosen to present them can be specifically aimed towards each segment of the market.

== See also ==
- Marketing
- Mass marketing
- Personalized marketing
