= Frame of reference (marketing) =

In marketing, "frame of reference" is how a new product, service, or concept is seen by the target market. (Morelo, n.d.). This creates a specific picture or idea about or surrounding a product, service, or concept being marketed. This picture can form the basis of a marketing strategy focused on a particular target market, or can be used to compare the product being marketed to other products of a similar vein. Consumers will compare newly introduced or discovered products to other products of which they have prior knowledge or experience with.

Frames of reference can also be shaped by consumer's personalities, culture, and history.

By categorising their product/service, marketers are able to highlight specific points of parity or points of difference in regards to their product compared to competitor's products. These points can be used to communicate to their target audience why their product should appeal to them more, and can highlight a competitive advantage in their offering. A frame of reference should be established for the new product, service, or concept being introduced into the market at the beginning of the marketing process, so that the target audience can develop a clear and concise understanding of what the product or service is all about, why it has been created, and to communicate exactly what makes it superior to or more attractive than competitor's products.

A frame of reference can be constructed or manipulated by marketing communicators to appeal to a target market's specific ideals, perceptions, beliefs, and attitudes. Identifying and appealing to a consumer's core beliefs and attitudes can be instrumental in the effectiveness of a marketing strategy based on a frame of reference, and these beliefs and attitudes can determine or construct a consumer's perception of a brand, product, or service. Key to creating an effective and useful frame of reference is the communicator's ability to understand its target market's perceptions of what they are being marketed.

F.O.R. must evolve with changing attitudes or beliefs of consumers. What is less important now may increase in importance in the future due to shifts in consumer values and beliefs.

== Perceptions ==
Perception is a mental process that people undergo in which they choose, arrange and interpret information in order to create a personalised and coherent understanding of what they are experiencing or witnessing. In a consumer's purchase journey the consumer will assign meaning to a product or brand upon their initial contact with the product or brand, and this meaning will be based upon their experiences, beliefs and attitudes towards the product or brand.

Perceptions are the foundation of brand value and marketing effectiveness. Marketing communications are conceived and executed with the explicit intention of engaging with consumers to influence and shape their perceptions of a product or brand. This is done to build a positive image, meaning behind, or experience associated with a product or brand for continued future transactions between retailer and consumer. If a customer understands and identifies with the meaning behind a product or brand, they are more likely to see value in the offering and perceive that product or brand as aligning with their ideals, wants, needs, beliefs, and attitudes.

Consumers can develop completely differing and opposing perceptions of the same product or brand due to their vastly different sensory experiences within the world, and also by how they interpret any information presented to them. Three perceptual processes can affect how a consumer cultivates their perception of a product or brand.

Due to the immense amount of advertising a consumer will be exposed to during the day, consumers engage in “selective attention” in order to prioritise their attention towards advertising material that relates to offerings that will specifically interest them, or fulfill their wants or needs. This means that they will filter out and ignore other advertisements or marketing messages deemed unimportant or unnecessary to them, making it much harder for marketing communicator's to attract their attention. “Selective distortion” involves a consumer unconsciously altering or shaping received information to fit to the personal meaning they already have regarding a product or brands attached message. Depending on their personal capacity to remember messages or information, a consumer may engage in “selective retention” by simply forgetting or remembering the message being marketed to them. This requires marketing communicator's to focus on highlighting positive points regarding their market offering, which are more likely to remain in the consumer's memory.

== Beliefs and Attitudes ==
People accumulate beliefs and attitudes through their actions and learning processes, and these can influence their buying behaviour. Beliefs can be based upon a person's opinions, faith, or knowledge (regardless of whether the knowledge is correct or incorrect). One of a marketing communicator's primary objectives is to inform the consumer with correct information in order to affirm or reaffirm a positive belief that the offering they are marketing is the desired destination for the consumer's purchasing journey. Pre-existing beliefs regarding a product or brand can impact a customer's purchasing behaviour though, as a consumer who has been previously misinformed about an offering will hold a negative or incorrect belief that the offering isn't suitable for them.

Attitude is used to describe a consumer's feelings or tendencies towards an offering, and will usually be reflected in that consumer's purchasing behaviour, specifically in regards to whether they do or do not either purchase the product or emotionally invest in the message on offer.

Attitudes can be difficult to change due to the amount of time it takes to develop and cultivate them, and therefore it is best to try and aim the marketing message towards consumers with a similar attitude. A huge part of marketing communications concerns changing people's attitudes, and instilling a new belief within them that their product, brand, or message is the most suitable and desirable offering available to the consumer.
