= Lucky Chinatown =

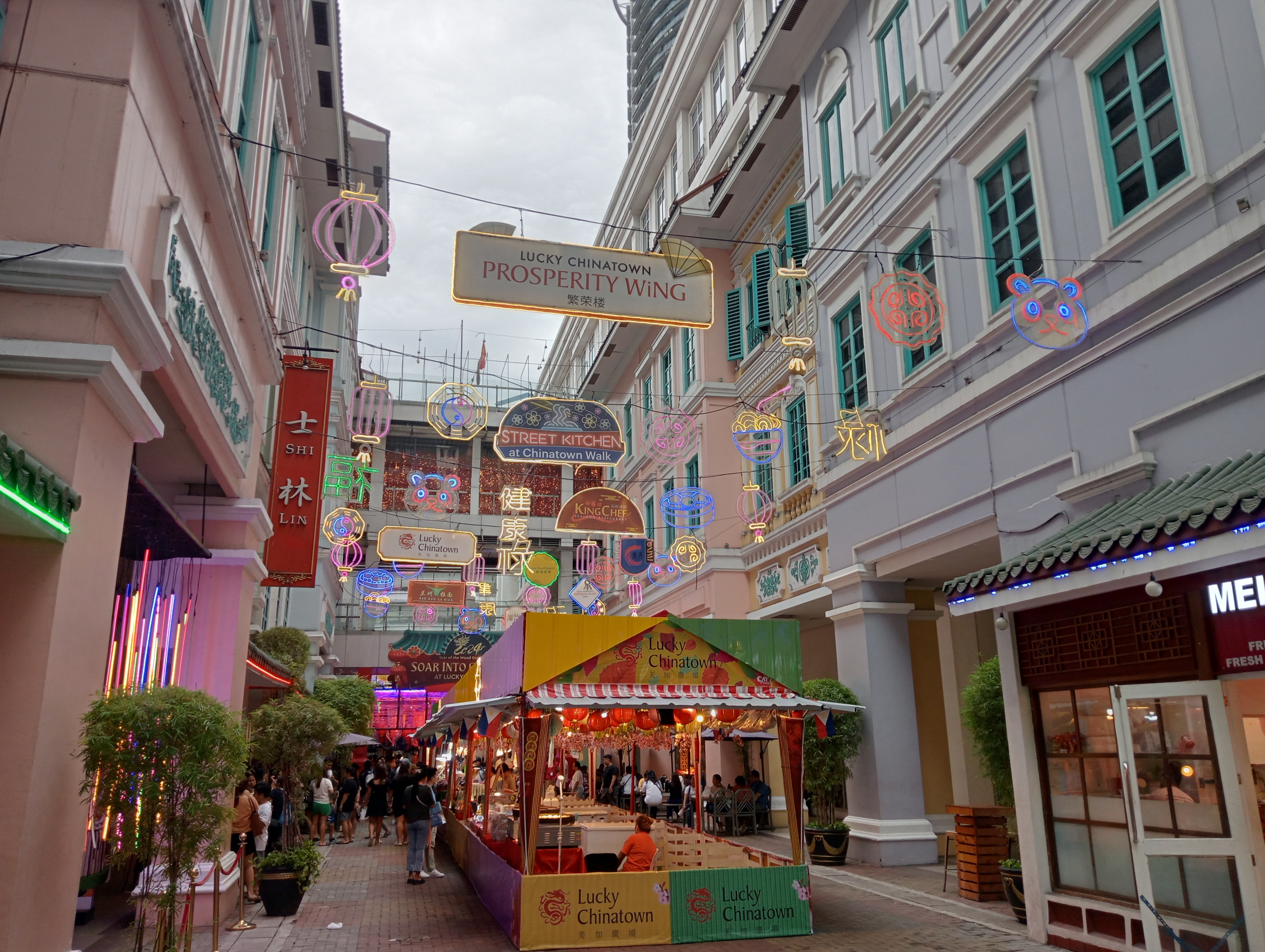
- Prosperity Wing of Lucky Chinatown mall
- Location: Binondo, Manila, Philippines
- Coordinates: 14°36′13″N 120°58′25″E
- Address: Reina Regente Street
- Opened: August 15, 2012; 14 years ago
- Developer: Megaworld Corporation
- Manager: Megaworld Lifestyle Malls
- Floor area: 108,000 m^{2} (1,160,000 sq ft)
- Floors: 3–5
- Parking: 1,000 slots
- Website: Lucky Chinatown

Lucky Chinatown (Chinese: 美加廣場; pinyin: Měijiā guǎngchǎng; Pe̍h-ōe-jī: Bí-ka kńg-tiûⁿ) is a lifestyle mall development located in Binondo, Manila. It is under the Megaworld Lifestyle Malls brand of Megaworld Corporation.

== History ==
Megaworld in 2008 bought land in Binondo which was previously occupied two Manila public high schools, the Rajah Soliman High School and José Abad Santos High School. New structures were built for the schools elsewhere in the city. A mall was built in its place.

The Lucky Chinatown shopping mall was officially opened on August 15, 2012 as part of the Chinatown Heritage Project. President Benigno Aquino III attended the opening ceremony.

In 2019, Lucky Chinatown complex expanded with the inauguration of the Hotel Lucky Chinatown on April 10 and the opening of the Chinatown Museum in June.

== Facilities and amenities ==
The Chinatown Walk is a promenade within Lucky Chinatown where people can try Filipino-Chinese products. It is inspired by Hong Kong and Shanghai market alleys where Chinese merchants sell Chinese delicacies, herbal medicine, and street food.

The Chinatown Museum, a National Commission on Culture and the Arts-recognized facility on the fourth level of the mall, features the history of Binondo.

The Hotel Lucky Chinatown is a 93-room hotel adjacent to the mall structure.
