= Abad Santos =

Abad Santos may refer to:

- Pedro Abad Santos (1876–1945), Filipino politician
- José Abad Santos (1886–1942), Supreme Court Chief Justice of the Philippines
- Vicente Abad Santos (1916–1993), Supreme Court Associate Justice of the Philippines
- Abad Santos Avenue, Manila, Philippines
- Abad Santos station, Manila, Philippines
- Jose Abad Santos Avenue, Central Luzon, Philippines
