= ESPS =

ESPS may refer to

- Espiritu Santo Parochial School, a private Catholic school in the Philippines.
- European Social and Political Studies, a course at UCL.
- The NATO ship prefix used for warships of the Spanish Navy
