= R. Papa station =

Train station in Manila, Philippines

R. Papa
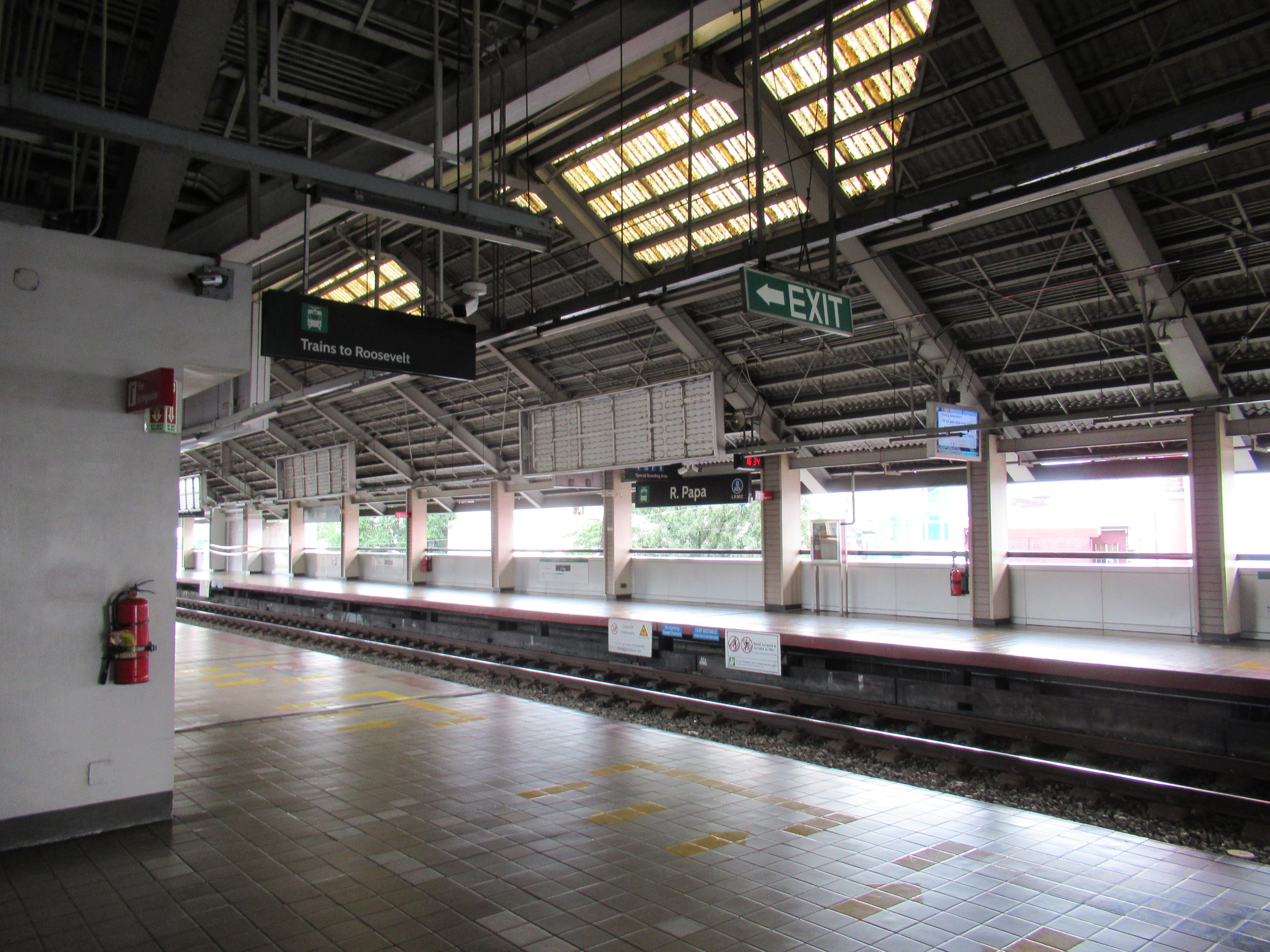

General information
- Location: 3405 Rizal Avenue Extension, Tondo and Santa Cruz; Manila, Metro Manila, Philippines
- Coordinates: 14°38′9.91″N 120°58′56.31″E
- Owner: Department of Transportation; Light Rail Manila Corporation
- Line: LRT Line 1
- Platforms: 2 (2 side)
- Tracks: 2

Construction
- Structure type: Elevated

Other information
- Station code: GL05

History
- Opened: May 12, 1985; 41 years ago

Services
Preceding station	Manila LRT	Following station
5th Avenue towards Fernando Poe Jr.	LRT Line 1	Abad Santos towards Dr. Santos
Track layout
Location
- Location within Manila Location within Metro Manila Location within Luzon Location within Philippines

R. Papa station is an elevated Light Rail Transit (LRT) station located on the LRT Line 1 (LRT-1) system in Tondo, Manila, Philippines. It is situated on Rizal Avenue Extension in Barrio Obrero. The station is named after the nearby Ricardo Papa Street, which is in turn named after a former Manila police chief-turned-Commanding General of the Philippine Army. The station is the first station in Rizal Avenue Extension going north and the last in the city of Manila, located just next to the city's boundary with Caloocan.

R. Papa station serves as the fifth station for LRT-1 trains headed to Dr. Santos and as the twenty-first station for trains headed to Fernando Poe Jr.

== History ==
R. Papa station was opened to the public on May 12, 1985, as part of the Rizal Line, which extended the LRT northward to Monumento.

== Transportation links ==
Commuters can take the many jeepneys or taxis to and from R. Papa station. Buses that ply the Rizal Avenue route also stop near the station. Tricycles are available outside the station, with a terminal beside the west entrance at the intersection of R. Papa Street and Rizal Avenue.

== Nearby landmarks ==
R. Papa station is located near the North Gate of Manila Chinese Cemetery, San Pancracio Parish Church, Campo Santo de La Loma, La Loma Catholic Cemetery, and Barrio Obrero.

== Gallery ==
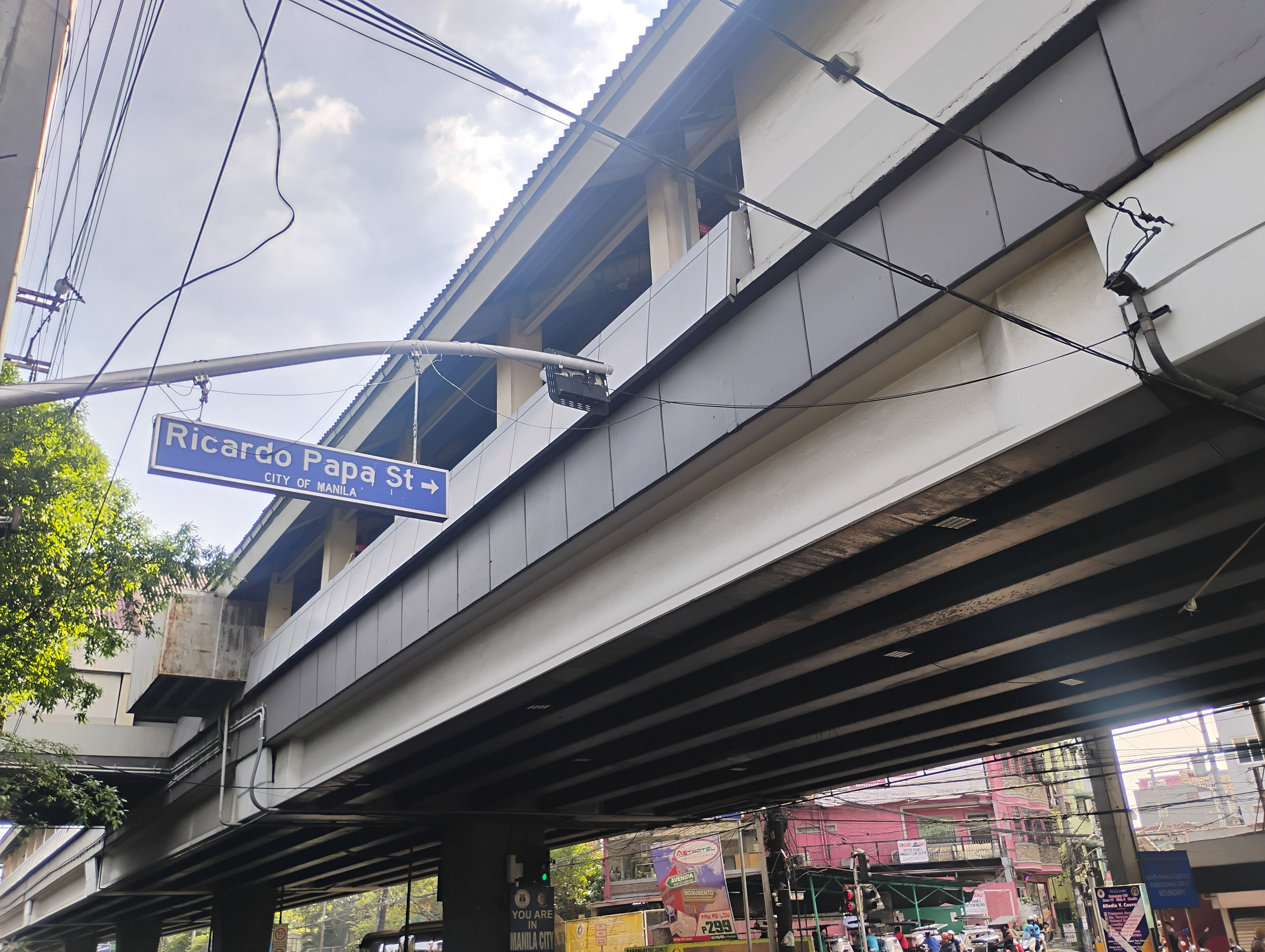
View of the station from street level

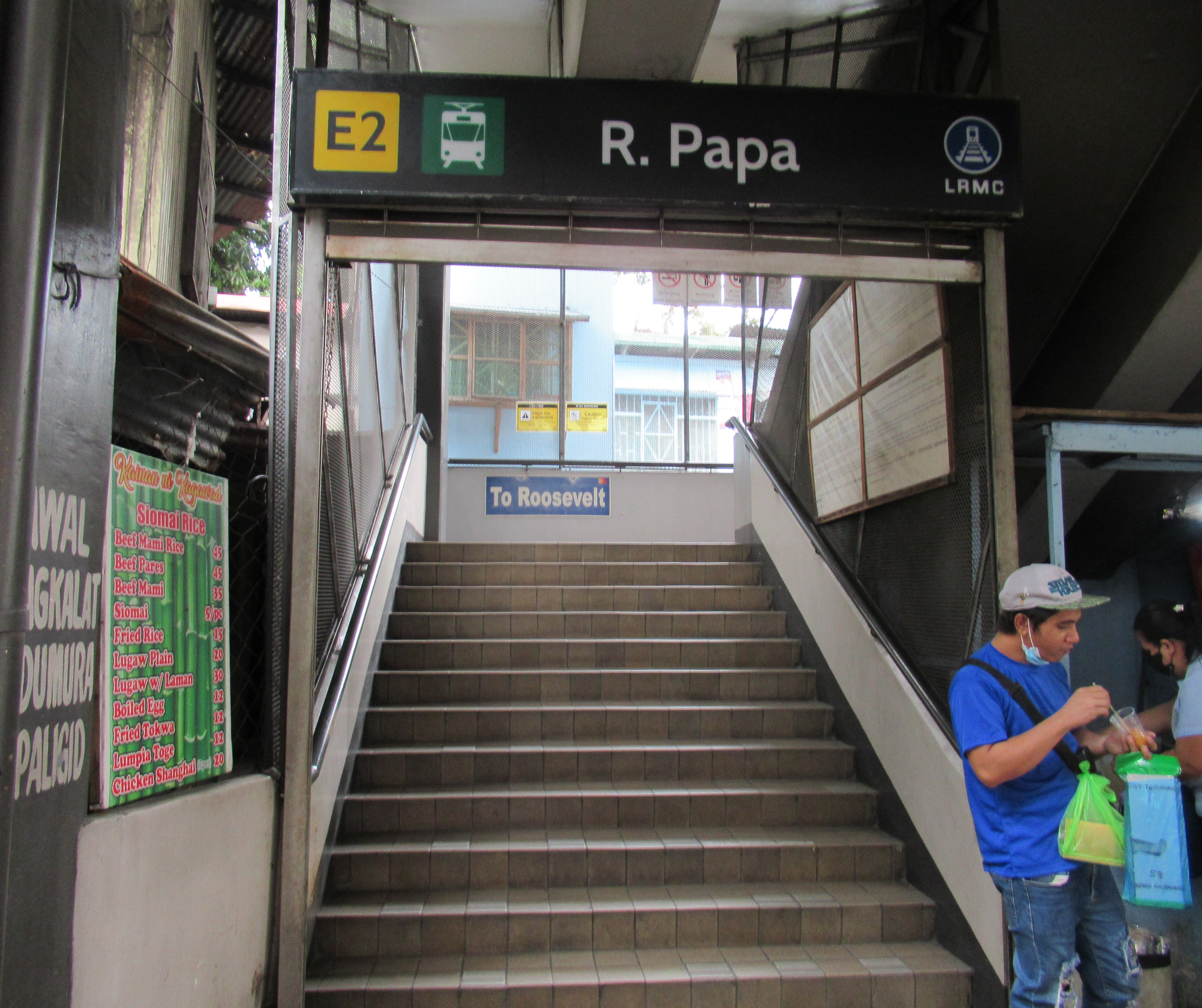
East entrance

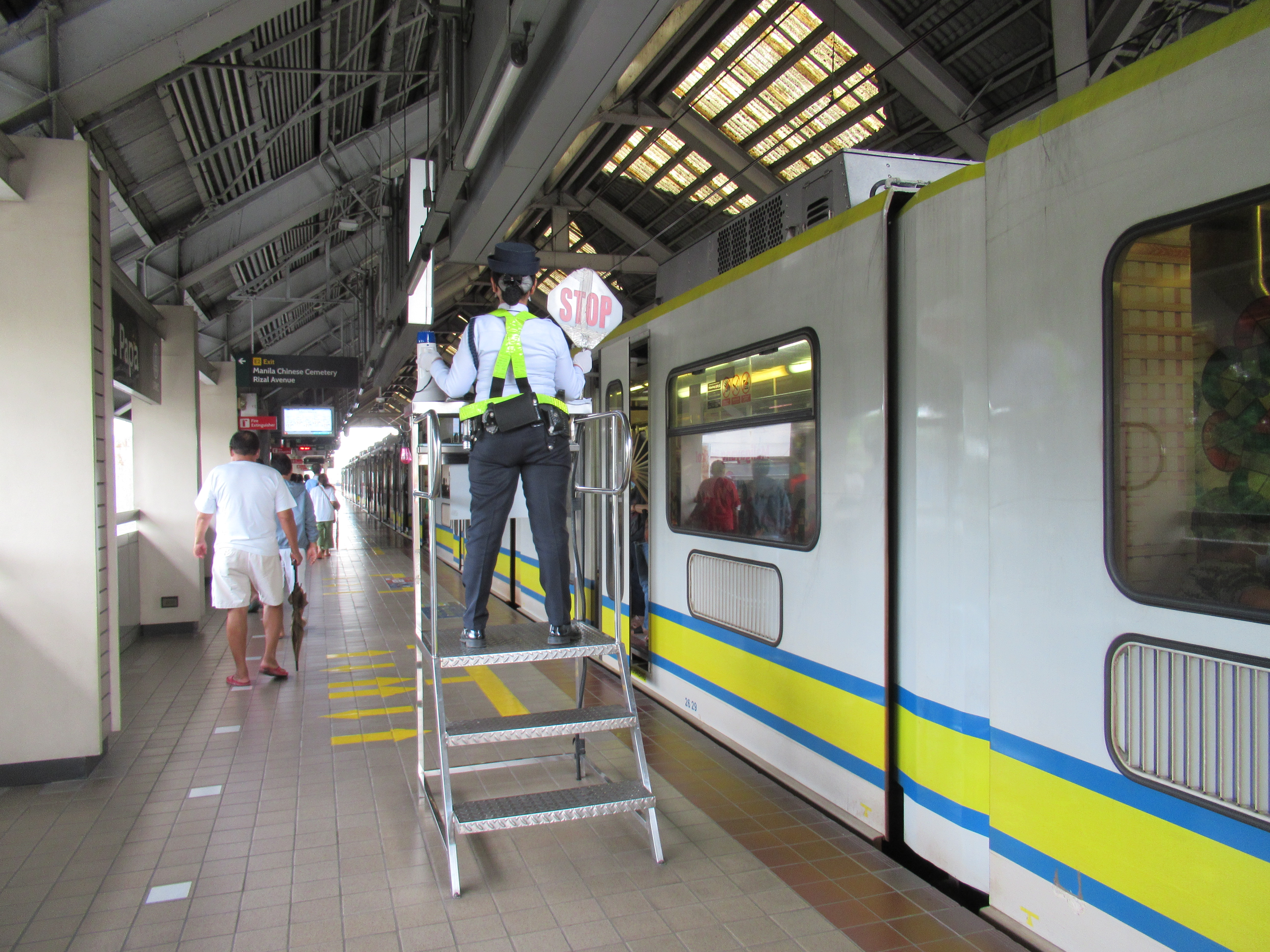
Train arriving at R. Papa

== See also ==
- List of rail transit stations in Metro Manila
- Manila Light Rail Transit System
- Media related to R. Papa station at Wikimedia Commons
