= Tayuman Street =

Thoroughfare in Manila, Philippines

Coordinates: 14°36′59″N 120°58′41″E

C-2

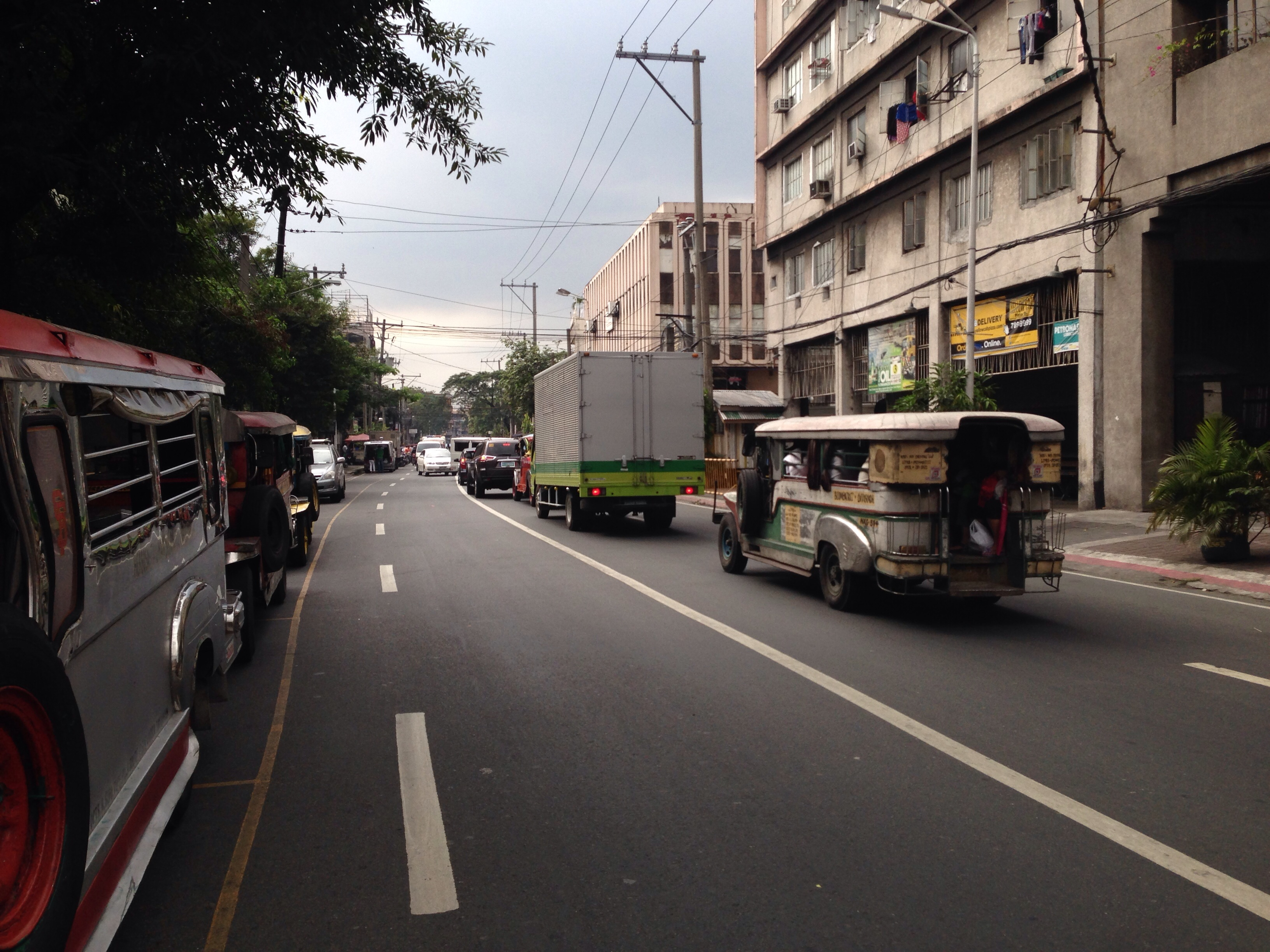
- Tayuman Street near San Lazaro Compound, Manila
- Interactive map of Tayuman Street
- Type: National Road
- Length: 1.59 km (0.99 mi); 1 km round
- Component highways: C-2 C-2; N140
- Location: Manila
- East end: N140 (Lacson Avenue) in Santa Cruz
- Major junctions: N150 (Rizal Avenue); N151 (Abad Santos Avenue)
- West end: N140 (Capulong Street) / Juan Luna Street in Tondo

Tayuman Street is a four-lane east-west street in northern Manila, Philippines. It stretches 1.6 kilometers (0.99 mi) from the former San Lazaro Hippodrome in Santa Cruz to Barrio Pritil in Tondo district. The street is designated as part of Circumferential Road 2.

Tayuman begins at an intersection with Lacson Avenue in the Santa Cruz district, fronting SM City San Lazaro. It crosses Rizal Avenue, passing underneath the Tayuman LRT Station, where it continues past the headquarters of the Department of Health into the residential areas of Santa Cruz and Tondo. The street ends at Juan Luna Street, near Puregold Tayuman supermarket, and extends west towards Manila North Harbor in Tondo as Capulong Street.

The street was named after the tayum, a type of indigo plant.

== Route description ==
Tayuman Street is designated a national secondary road with route number N140. The road has four lanes, two per direction, and is mostly lined with side streets and local businesses.

Numerous establishments line the road, like the Department of Health Central Office, Puregold Tayuman branch, Sentro ng Karunungan Library, Archdiocesan Shrine of Espiritu Santo, Immaculate Conception Parish Church, and Tayuman Commercial Center. San Lazaro Tourism and Business Park and SM City San Lazaro, which stand on the former location of the San Lazaro Racetrack (which moved to Carmona, Cavite), lie on the east end of the street. Schools also line the street, like the Andres Bonifacio Elementary School (Tayuman cor Ipil Street), Espiritu Santo Parochial School, Manila Cathedral School, and Rizal Elementary School.

== Jeepney routes ==
Tayuman Street

- Tayuman - Pritil
- Tayuman - Lardizabal
- Blumentritt - Divisoria

Intersections Jeepney Route

- Gasak - Recto (Oroquieta Street)
- Navotas - Recto (Oroquieta Street)
- MCU - Recto (Oroquieta Street)
- Malanday - Recto (Oroquieta Street)
- MCU - Divisoria (Abad Santos Avenue)
- Malanday - Divisoria (Abad Santos Avenue)

== Intersections ==
The entire route is located in Manila.

km	mi	Destinations	Notes
8.006	4.975	N140 (Lacson Avenue)	SM City San Lazaro
		Pedro Guevarra Street	
		Sulu Street	
		Felix Huertas Street	Traffic light intersection.
		Manuel Hizon Street	
		Oroquieta Road	Traffic light intersection. Espiritu Santo Parochial School
		Maria Natividad Street	Tayuman Commercial Center
		N150 (Rizal Avenue)	Traffic light intersection
		Anacleto Street	Department of Health
		Tomas Mapua Street	
		Makata Street	
		Severino Reyes Street	
		Kusang Loob Street	Dr. Jose Fabella Memorial Hospital
		Ipil Street	Andres Bonifacio Elementary School
		E. Manalo Street (Apitong Street)	Iglesia ni Cristo Congregation
		Dapdap Street	
		Yakal Street (Riverside)	Estero de San Lazaro
1.050	0.652	Almeda Street	
		N151 (Abad Santos Avenue)	Traffic light intersection
		Antonio Rivera Street	Novo Department Store
		Katamanan Street	Immaculate Conception Parish Church, Missionaries of Charity of Joy
		Imaculada Street	Missionaries of Charity of Joy, TESDA, Manila Cathedral School
		Railroad crossing with PNR Metro South Commuter Line	
		Dagupan Extension	
		G. Perfecto Street	
		Perfecto Street	
		Prudencia Street	
6.416	3.987	Juan Luna Street - Tayuman (Tondo,_Manila)	Traffic light intersection near Puregold Tayuman; road continues west as N140 (Capulong Street)
1.000 mi = 1.609 km; 1.000 km = 0.621 mi

== See also ==
- Major roads in Manila
