= 5th Avenue station (LRT) =

Train station in Caloocan, Philippines

5th Avenue
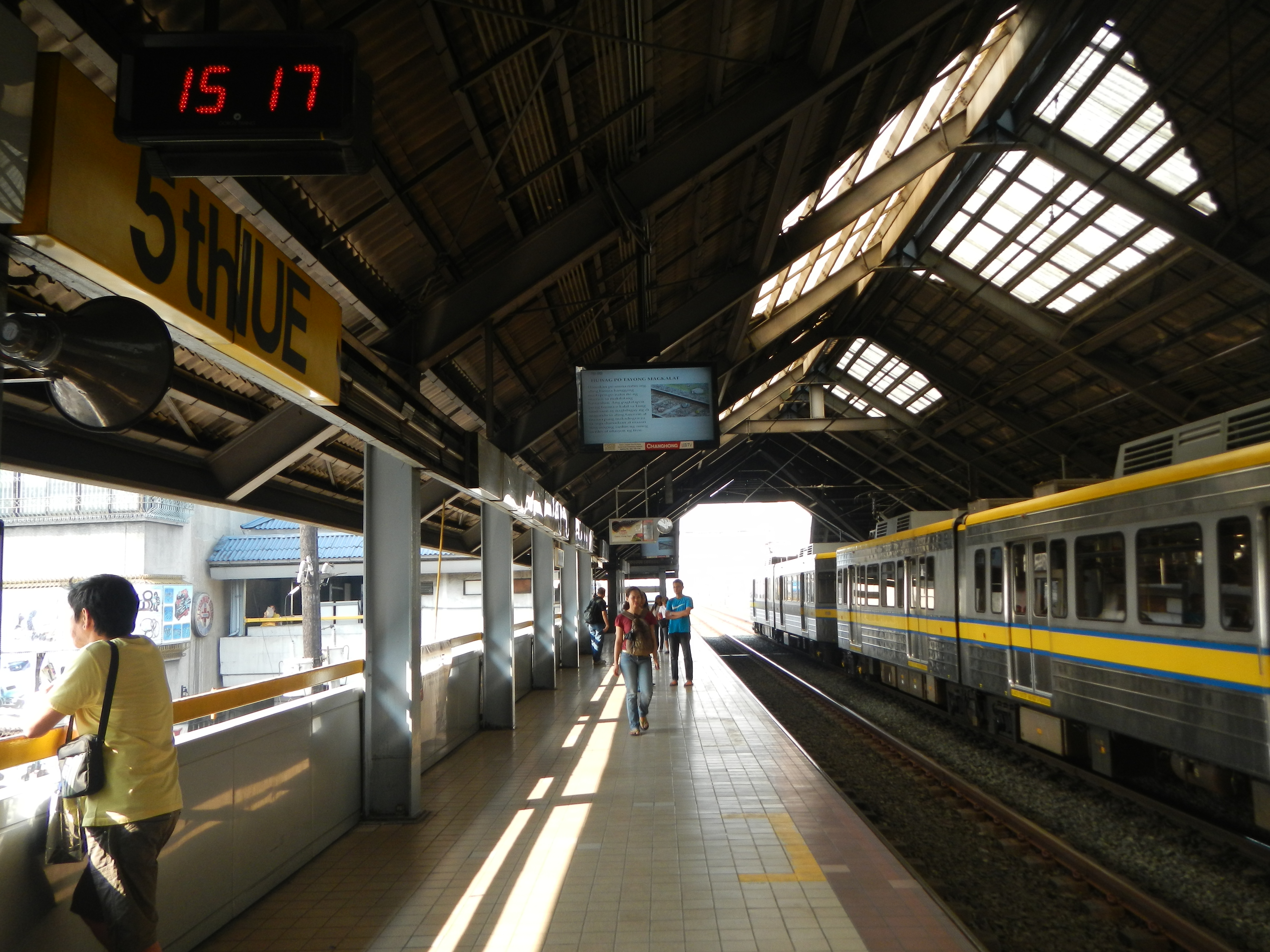

General information
- Location: 242 Rizal Avenue Extension; Grace Park East; Caloocan, Metro Manila, Philippines
- Coordinates: 14°38′40.11″N 120°59′0.87″E
- Owner: Department of Transportation; Light Rail Manila Corporation
- Line: LRT Line 1
- Platforms: 2 (2 side)
- Tracks: 2

Construction
- Structure type: Elevated

Other information
- Station code: GL04

History
- Opened: May 12, 1985; 41 years ago

Services
Preceding station	Manila LRT	Following station
Monumento towards Fernando Poe Jr.	LRT Line 1	R. Papa towards Dr. Santos
Track layout
Location
- Location within Metro Manila Location within Luzon Location within Philippines

5th Avenue station is an elevated Light Rail Transit (LRT) station located on the LRT Line 1 (LRT-1) system in Caloocan, Philippines. The station is situated on the intersection of Rizal Avenue Extension and 5th Avenue (C-3), after which the station is named, at the boundaries of Grace Park East and Grace Park West.

5th Avenue station serves as the fourth station for LRT-1 trains headed to Dr. Santos, the twenty-second station for trains headed to Fernando Poe Jr., and is one of the two LRT-1 stations serving Caloocan, the other being Monumento station.

== History ==
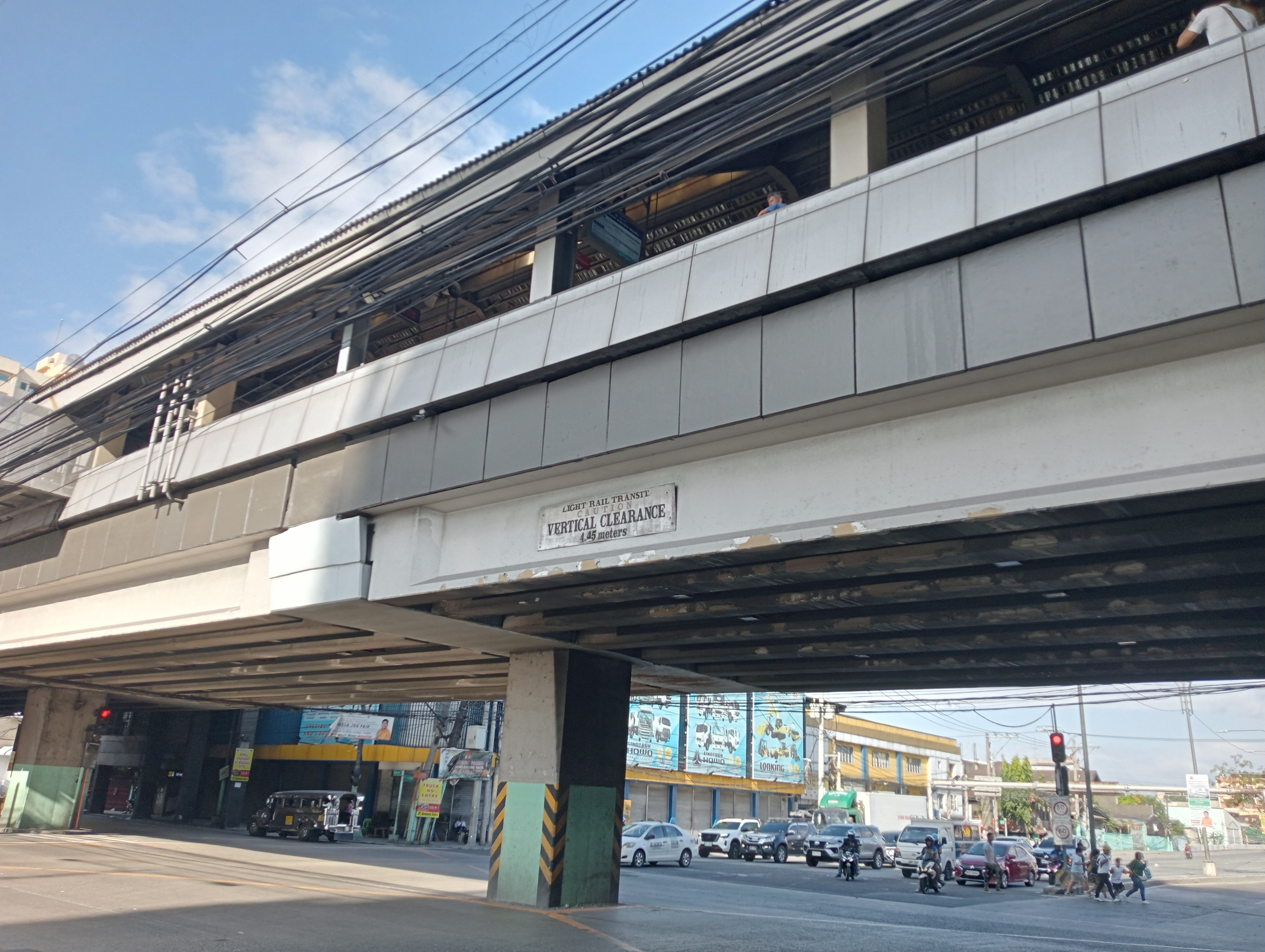
5th Avenue station from street level

5th Avenue station was opened to the public on May 12, 1985, as part of the Rizal Line, which extended the LRT northward to Monumento.

== Transportation links ==
The station is served by buses and jeepneys plying the Rizal Avenue and 5th Avenue routes. Tricycles may also be boarded at nearby streets.

== See also ==
- List of rail transit stations in Metro Manila
- Manila Light Rail Transit System
