= SM City Grand Central =

Shopping mall in Caloocan, Philippines

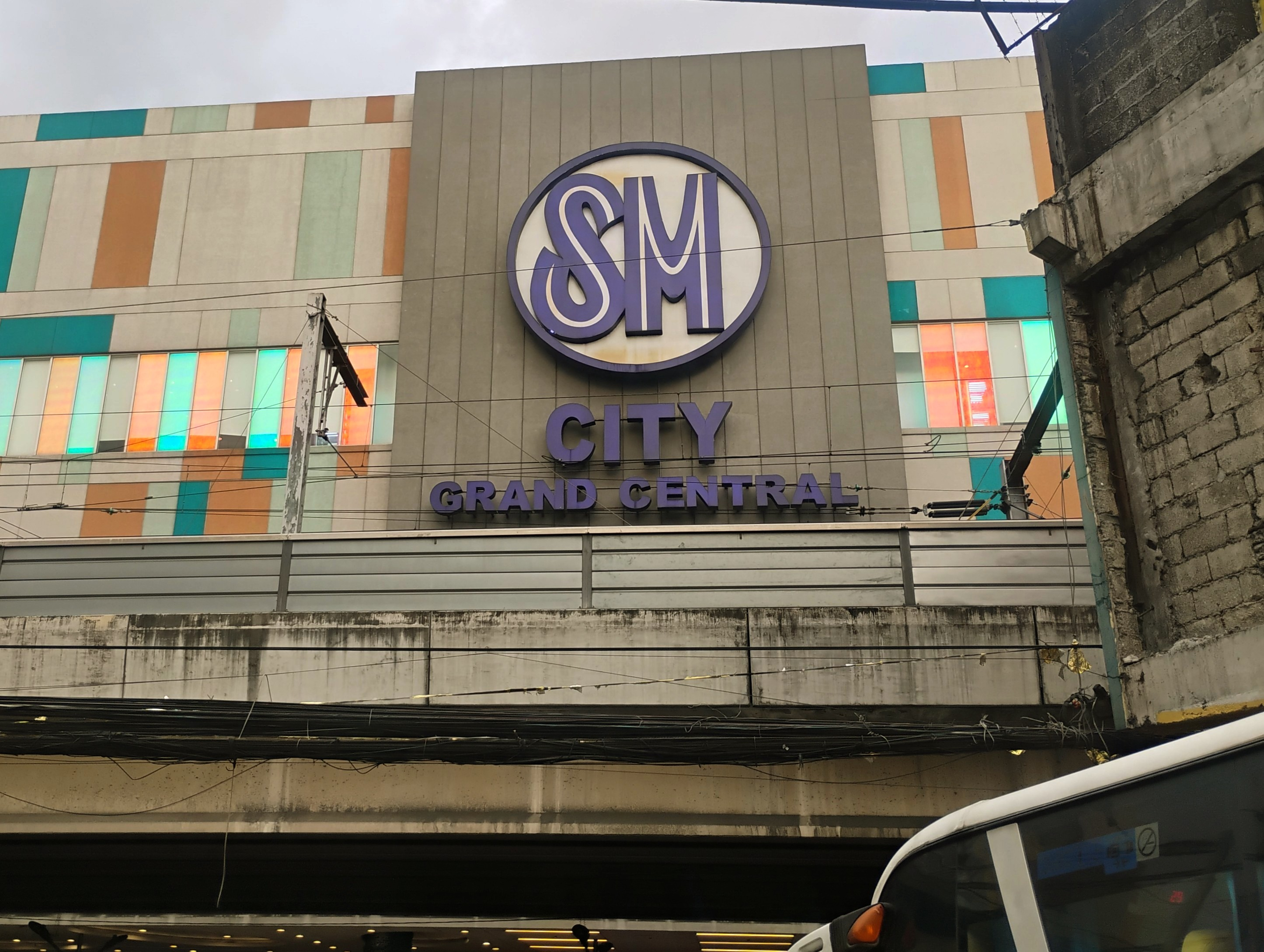
- The facade of SM City Grand Central in 2025
- Location: Rizal Avenue Extension, Caloocan, Philippines
- Coordinates: 14°39′18″N 120°59′04″E
- Opened: As Ever Gotesco Grand Central: August 9, 1988; 38 years ago; As SM City Grand Central: November 26, 2021; 4 years ago
- Closed: As Ever Gotesco Grand Central: March 17, 2012; 14 years ago
- Developer: SM Prime Holdings
- Manager: SM Prime Holdings
- Floor area: 102,790 m^{2} (1,106,400 sq ft)
- Floors: 5 upper + 1 basement (Note: The basement level is known as the Lower Ground Level.)
- Parking: 700
- Public transit: Monumento; 8 14 19 35 42 Monumento
- Website: SM City Grand Central

SM City Grand Central is a shopping mall owned and operated by SM Prime Holdings, the Philippines' largest mall operator. It is located along Rizal Avenue Extension, Caloocan, Metro Manila. It is built on the former site of the Ever Gotesco Grand Central that caught fire in 2012, and is the mall's third acquisition from Ever Gotesco Malls, having previously acquired Ever Gotesco Ortigas (and reopened as SM City East Ortigas) and its standalone mall near the Monumento roundabout, establishing SM Hypermarket Monumento.

It is the 2nd SM Supermall in Caloocan and the 77th overall.

== History ==
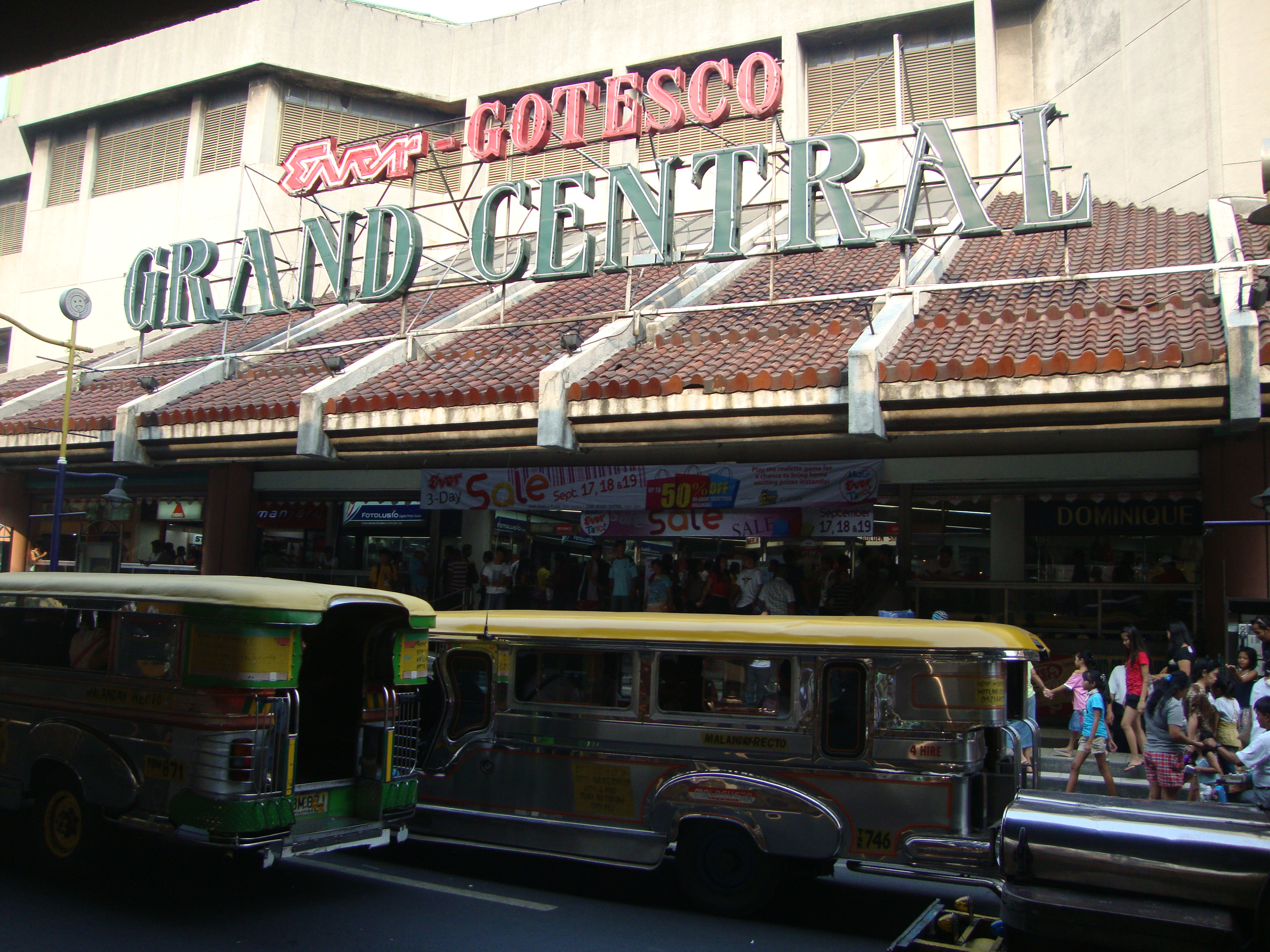
Ever Gotesco Grand Central prior to the 2012 fire

SM City Grand Central was known as Ever Gotesco Grand Central from its opening on August 9, 1988 until the building burned down on March 17, 2012. Final demolition came from 2012 to 2013. In 2015, SM bought the rights to renovate the mall and named it SM City Grand Central. The newly built mall was opened to the public on November 26, 2021.

== Features ==
The mall has a floor area of 102,790 m^{2} (1,106,400 sq ft) with six floors. It features SM Store and SM Supermarket. It also hosts Ace Hardware, Our Home, Watsons, Surplus, Sports Central, Pet Express, Miniso and others. It has four state-of-the-art cinemas and two director's clubs, as well as Cyberzone.

It offers Skylight Park indoor garden and Chapel of Our Lady of the Most Holy Rosary, a Roman Catholic chapel. The mall has parking space for 700 cars. The mall is directly linked to Monumento LRT station.

== Gallery ==
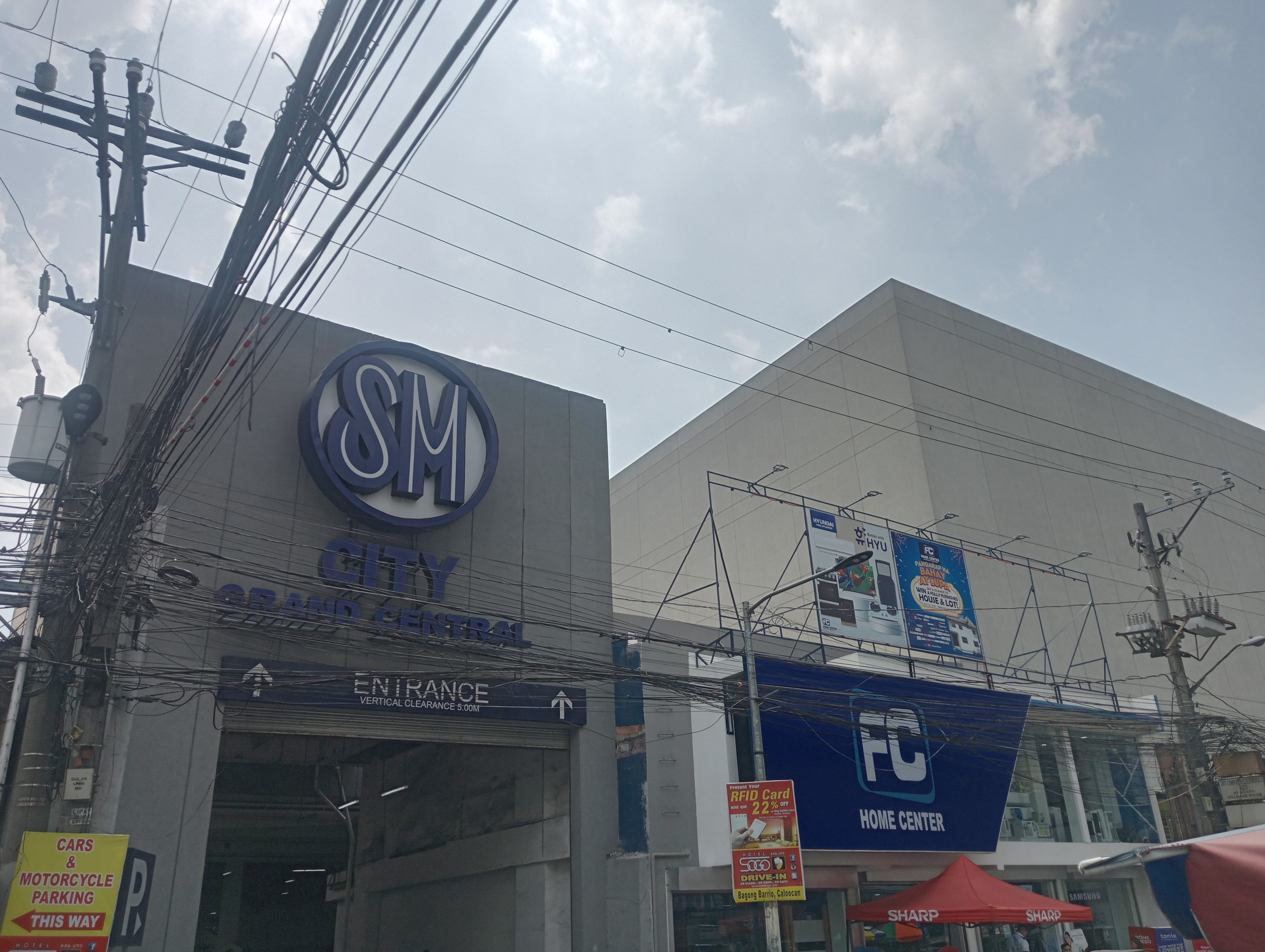
Parking entrance at L. Bustamante Street

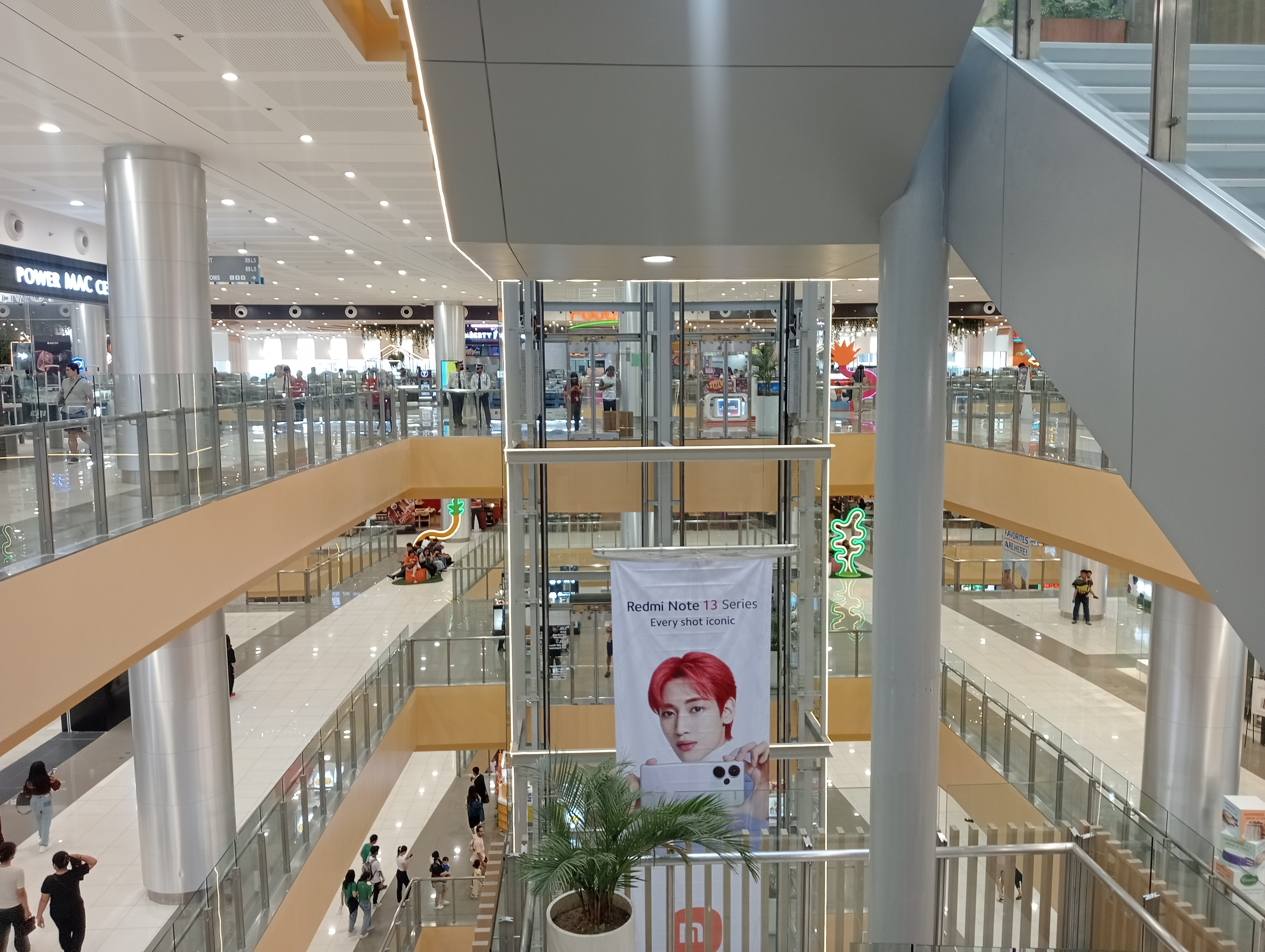
Atrium

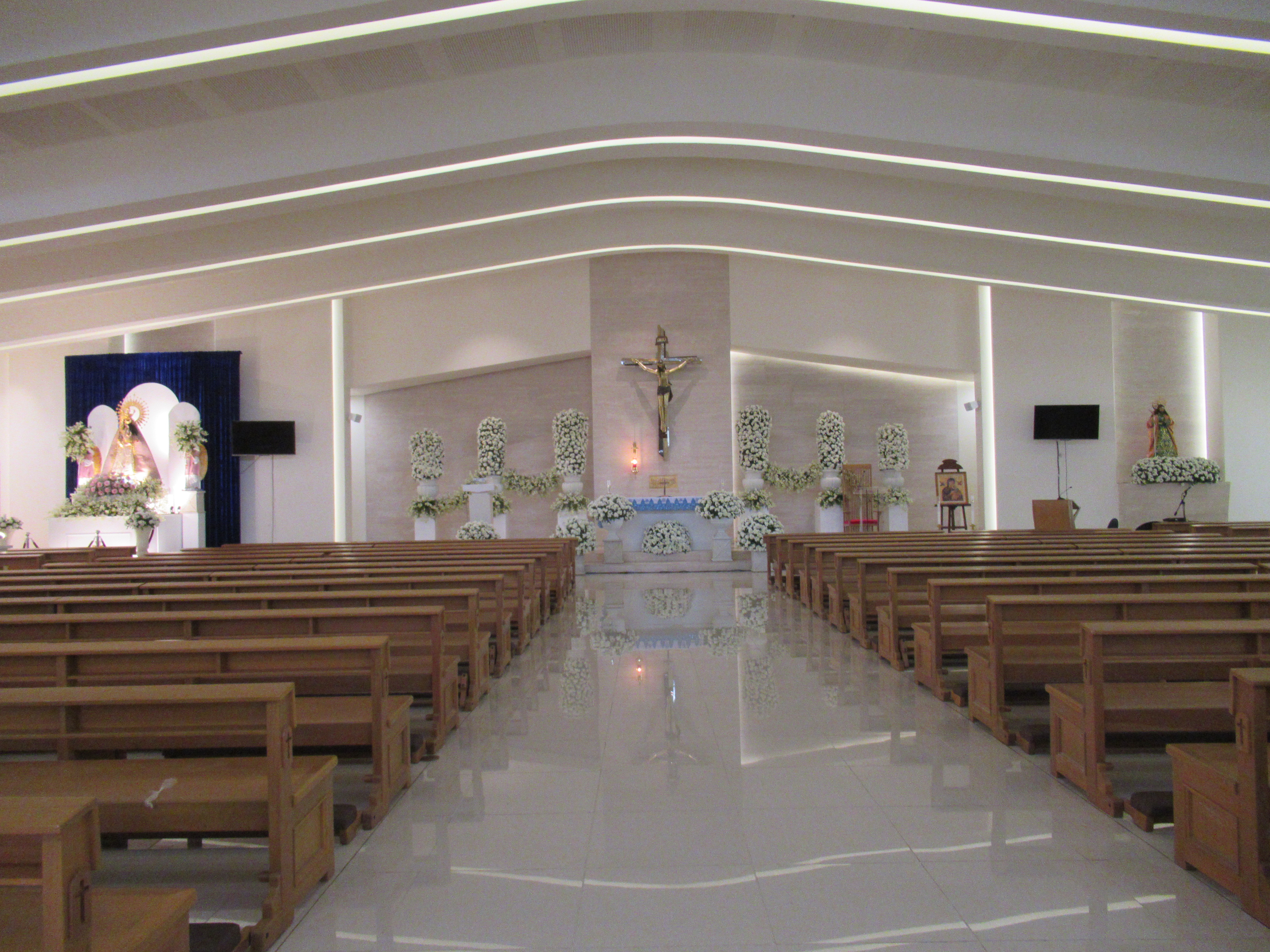
Chapel of Our Lady of the Most Holy Rosary

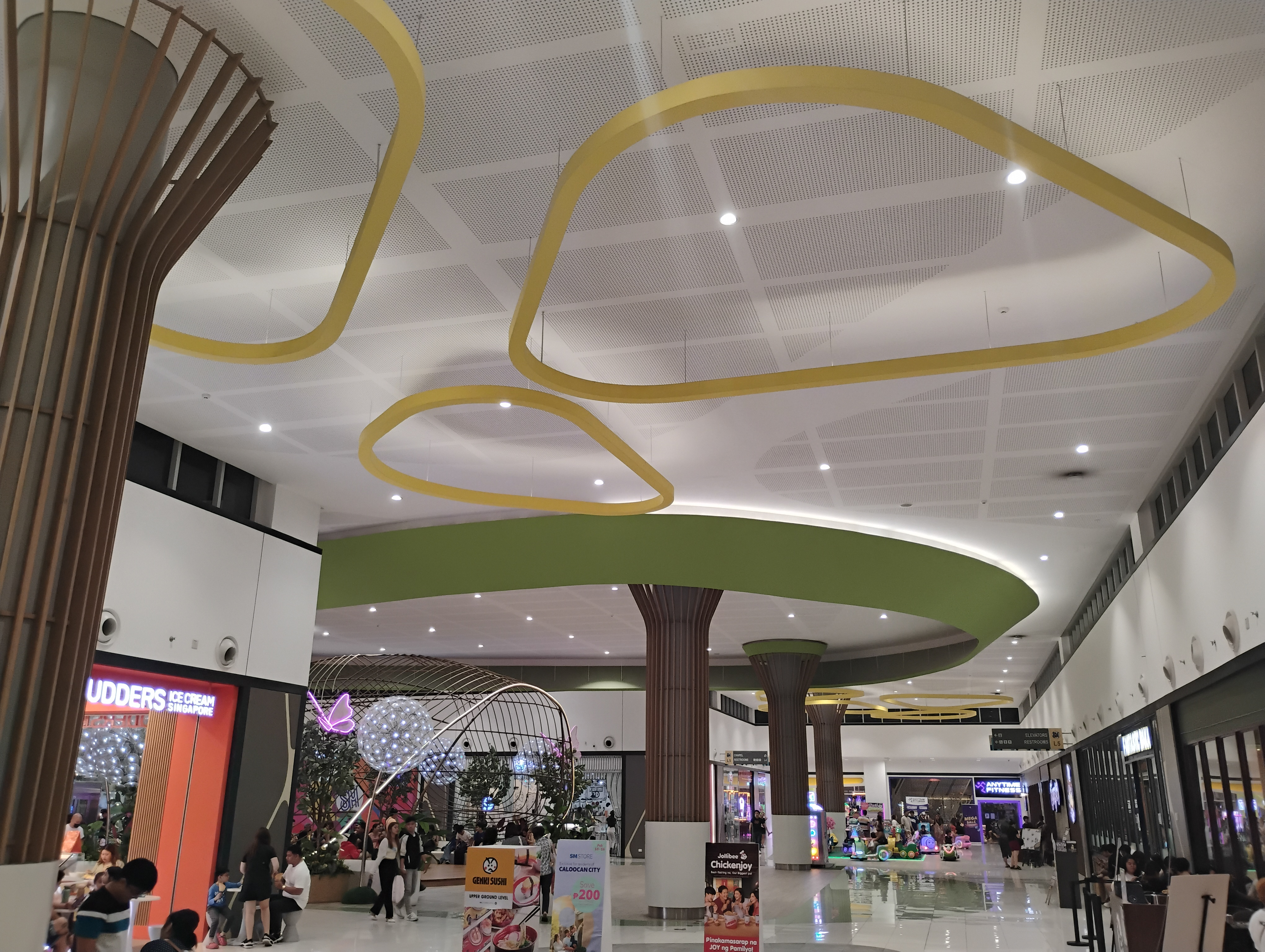
5th Floor, featuring the Skylight Park indoor garden

== Notes ==
Preceded by SM City Daet	78th SM Supermall; 2021	Succeeded by SM City Roxas
