= Rizal Avenue =

Major road in northern Manila, Philippines

Coordinates: 14°36′56″N 120°58′57″E

R-9
- Avenida; J. Rizal Avenue
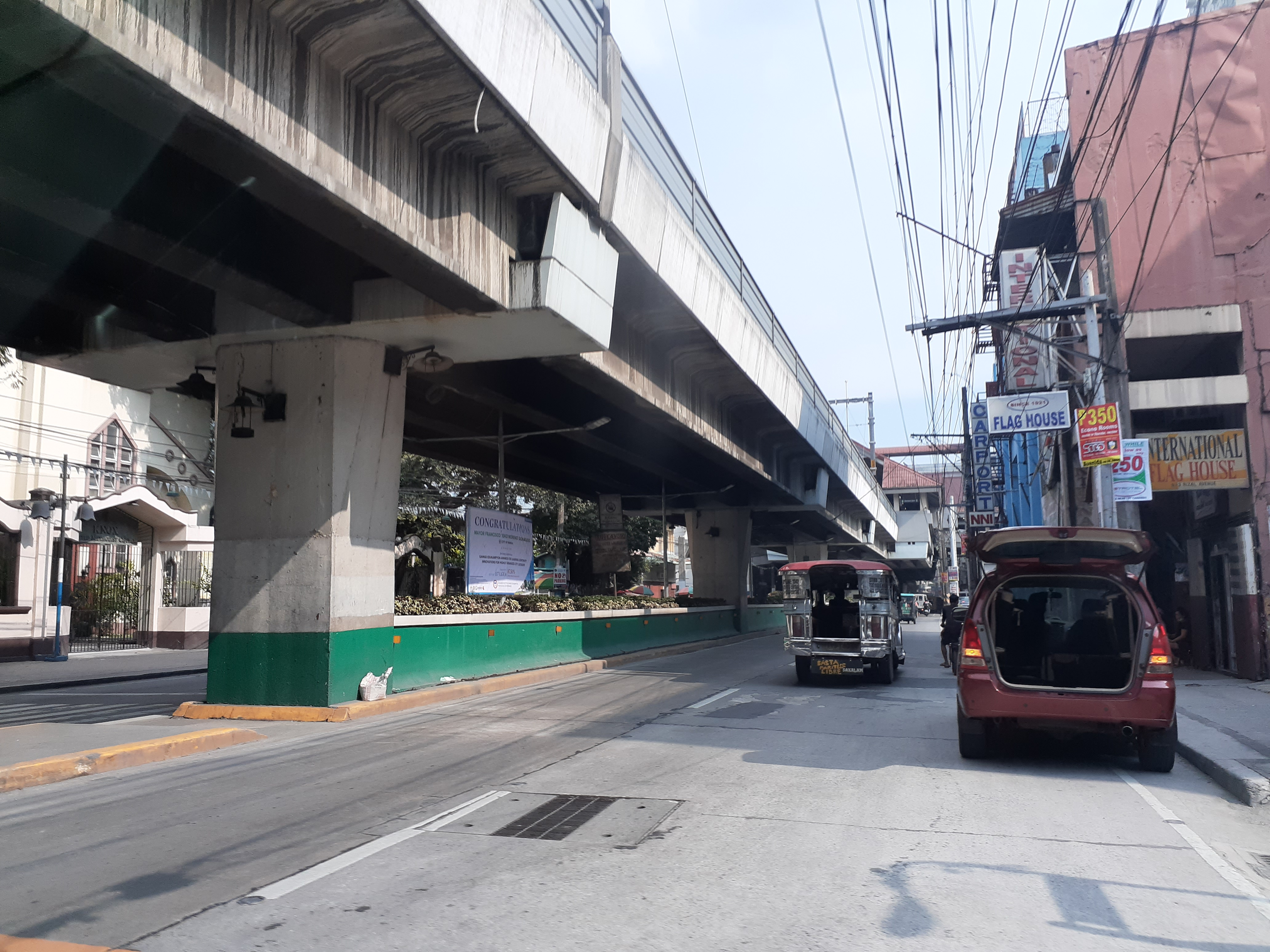
- Rizal Avenue looking south from Lope de Vega Street intersection in Santa Cruz, Manila
- Interactive map of Rizal Avenue
- Native name: Avenida Rizal (Spanish)
- Former name: Manila North Road
- Part of: R-9 R-9; N150
- Namesake: José Rizal
- Length: 6.573 km (4.084 mi)
- North end: AH 26 (N1) (Bonifacio Monument Circle) in Caloocan
- Major junctions: N130 (5th Avenue); N151 (Abad Santos Avenue); N160 (Blumentritt Road); N140 (Tayuman Street); N145 (Recto Avenue)
- South end: N150 (Carriedo Street) in Santa Cruz and Quiapo, Manila

Rizal Avenue, also known as J. Rizal Avenue, Avenida Rizal or simply Avenida, is one of Manila's main thoroughfares, running with two to six lanes from its Santa Cruz and Quiapo districts to the Bonifacio Monument (Monumento) Circle in Caloocan. Named after the José Rizal, one of the Philippine national heroes, it is a part of Radial Road 9 (R-9). The LRT Line 1 elevated railway is built above the street throughout its entire length, and several jeepneys ply the area, taking passengers from Caloocan, Quezon City, and Valenzuela. Most of the street is within Santa Cruz, Manila. The avenue forms part of National Route 150 (N150) of the Philippine highway network.

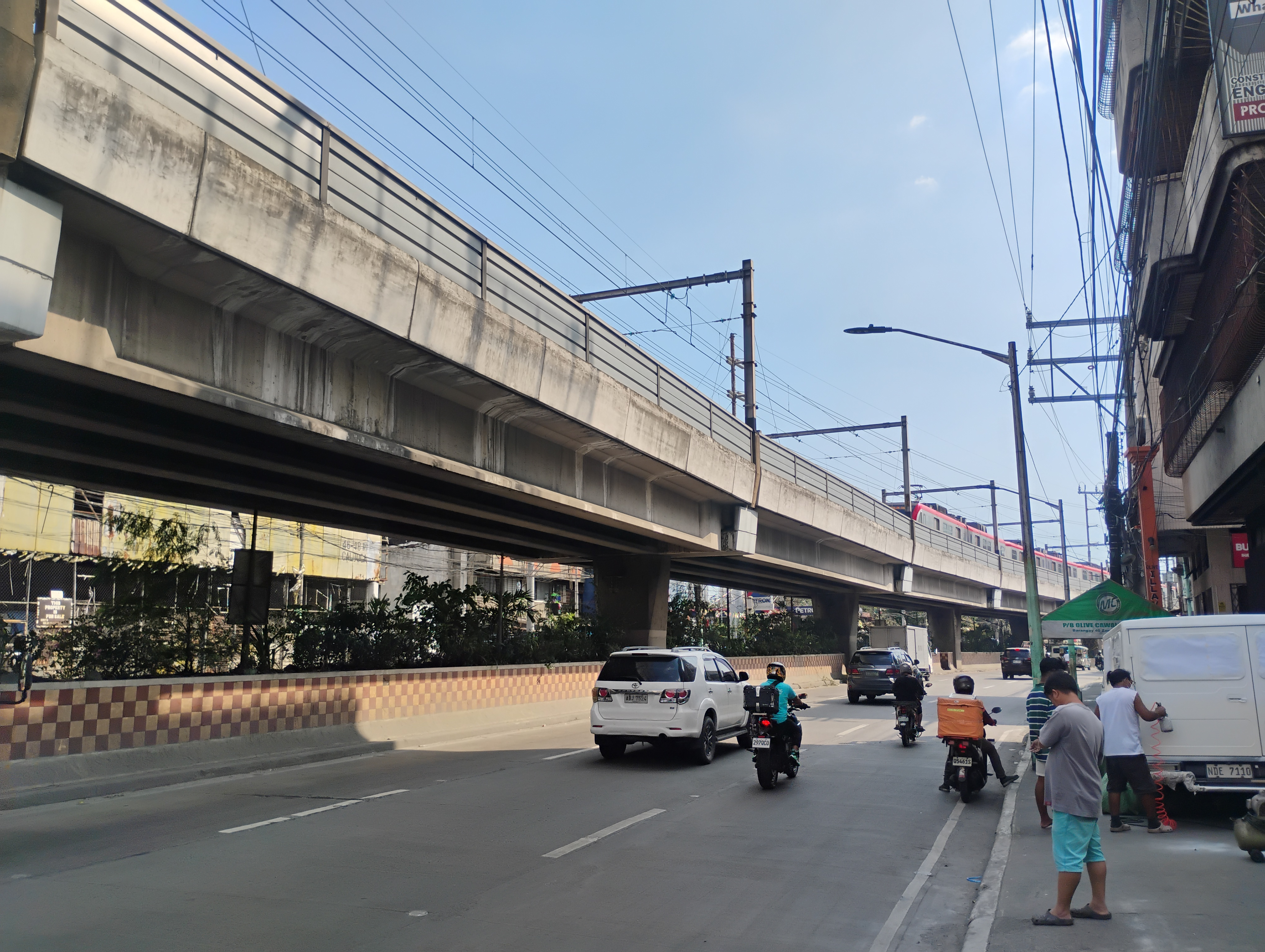
Rizal Avenue Extension in Caloocan, referring to the section of Rizal Avenue north of Abad Santos Avenue, Manila.

== Contemporary landmarks ==
At the northern end of the avenue is the Bonifacio Monument roundabout. Vehicles coming from Rizal Avenue's northbound carriageway can turn right into EDSA (Circumferential Road 4); its northern logical extension would be the MacArthur Highway (Manila North Road; continuation of Radial Road 9), which terminates at Aparri, Cagayan. Vehicles from Samson Road (EDSA's logical western extension) enter the avenue to its southbound carriageway.

The avenue also provides access to the entrance and exit gates of the Manila Chinese Cemetery. The San Lazaro Compound (which hosts the San Lazaro Hospital, the Jose R. Reyes Memorial Medical Center and the Department of Health) and the Archdiocesan Shrine of Espiritu Santo are the other landmarks along the avenue.

Along the avenue are several shopping malls, including SM City Grand Central, DiviMall Monumento, North Mall, Tayuman Center Mall, Odeon Terminal Mall, Emerald Circle Avenida, Good Earth Plaza, and Isetann Carriedo. In front of Isetann is Plaza Lacson. South of Plaza Lacson is MacArthur Bridge, then Taft Avenue (Radial Road 2). Quiapo Church is an eastbound walk from the square, although this part of the street has been pedestrianized.

=== Train stations along Rizal Avenue ===
Nine LRTA Line 1 stations are located at Rizal Avenue as its main landmarks. They are, from north to south:

- Monumento
- 5th Avenue
- R. Papa
- Abad Santos
- Blumentritt
- Tayuman
- Bambang
- Doroteo Jose
- Carriedo

In addition, the LRTA Line 2 system crosses the avenue at Recto Avenue, and the Recto station is a short walk away from the avenue. The Philippine National Railways also crosses Rizal Avenue Extension, with Blumentritt railway station a short walk away.

== History ==
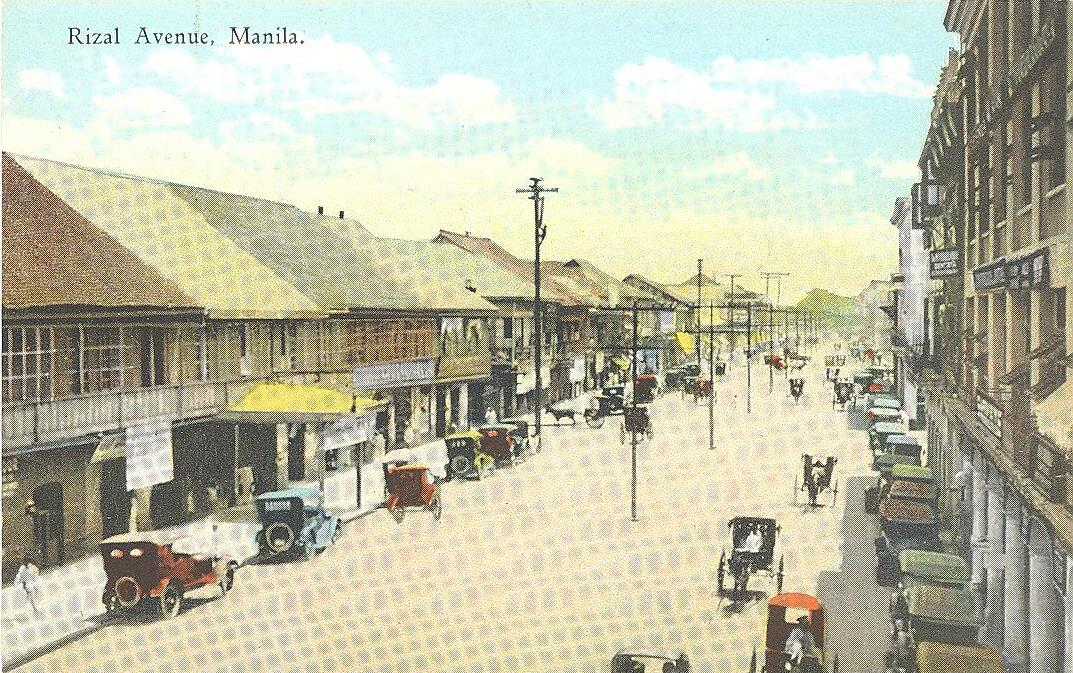
Painting of Rizal Avenue (unknown year)

Avenida Rizal was created by Manila city ordinance in 1911 from two parallel streets in the city – Calle Dulumbayan (from Tagalog dulo ng bayan, meaning "the edge of town", and the area of the same name) and Calle Salcedo. It also occupied the old Calle Cervantes, Calzada de San Lazaro, and Camino á Gagalaḡin in Santa Cruz.

Once planned to terminate at the Manila Chinese Cemetery at the north, the road was lengthened in the next two decades up to the adjacent then-municipality of Caloocan, then part of Rizal province, where the then-new monument honoring Andres Bonifacio, now known as Monumento, is located. The extension was originally referred to as Manuguit Extension, and Rizal Avenue Extension's name had also reached further north up to Polo, Bulacan (now Valenzuela, Metro Manila). The avenue was designated Route 3A and a part of Manila North Road (Highway 3 or Route 3) that connects Manila to northern Luzon. It became Manila's longest street during that time. Before and right after World War II, the avenue was center of the city's social life, with the street lined with shops, restaurants and movie theaters. The theaters were designed by the prominent architects of the day, many of whom would become National Artists. Its section between Calle Carriedo and Calle Blumentritt was also one of the routes of tranvia until 1945.

Two National Artists for Architecture, Pablo Antonio and Juan Nakpil, created several movie theaters along the avenue. Antonio designed the Galaxy, the Ideal, the Scala and the Lyric theaters, while Nakpil designed the Capitol, the Ever and the Avenue theaters. As the years went by, the area was victimized by urban renewal.

By the 1960s, economic activities shifted from the downtown area of Manila to Makati. The departure of business and the rich residents from Manila to the suburbs and the increase in low-skilled rural migrants looking for jobs led to the deterioration of the old business districts, including Rizal Avenue. The construction of the LRTA Line 1 system in the 1980s, which required the closure of Rizal Avenue to vehicular traffic, essentially killed business along the route. The cinemas themselves resorted to showing double-feature B-movies and soft porn as people transferred to the newer and more modern Ortigas Center and the Ayala Center. In the early 1980s, the construction of the LRT Line 1 viaduct traversing along the avenue occurred, and operations commenced in 1985.

On September 15, 2016, Manila Mayor Joseph Estrada declared a parking ban on the avenue's stretch in the city. During the term of his successor, Isko Moreno, the stretch was also lighted up with new street lights from 2021 to 2022 as part of the city's street lighting program.

=== Former pedestrian zone ===
In 2000, during the term of Manila Mayor Lito Atienza, the stretch from Recto Avenue to Carriedo Street was transformed into a pedestrian-only area by paving the road with bricks as part of an urban renewal project. It rerouted vehicular traffic to secondary roads like Tomas Mapúa and Doroteo Jose Streets. The project included painting the buildings and the LRT Line 1 system. The Ideal Theater was previously demolished, and the Galaxy, Scala, and Lyric theaters were already misused. The lower level of the Ever Theater was converted into stalls, while the upper levels were abandoned. Only the refurbished Capitol Theater remained until its demolition in 2020. Initially intended to be temporary, the pedestrianization of Rizal Avenue was completed in 2003 but persisted until 2008. The Avenue Theater, which survived the Battle of Manila in 1945, was demolished in 2006 to give way to a parking area. The costs of maintaining the facility were too high compared to converting it into a parking area. The National Historical Institute (NHI) and several private entities tried to prevent the building from being torn down.

One of Manila Mayor Alfredo Lim's first decisions after winning the elections of 2007 was to reopen the pedestrian-only section of Rizal Avenue, which has elicited complaints from shopkeepers due to decreased traffic of people, and from commuters, which caused traffic jams on secondary streets. Since the cost of the tiles for the pedestrianization was about ₱40 (equivalent to ₱65.11 in 2021) each, the tiles were carefully removed for them to be used in future projects. On July 17, 2007, Lim attended the ceremony reopening the closed portion of Rizal Avenue, and it has remained open to this day.

== Intersections ==
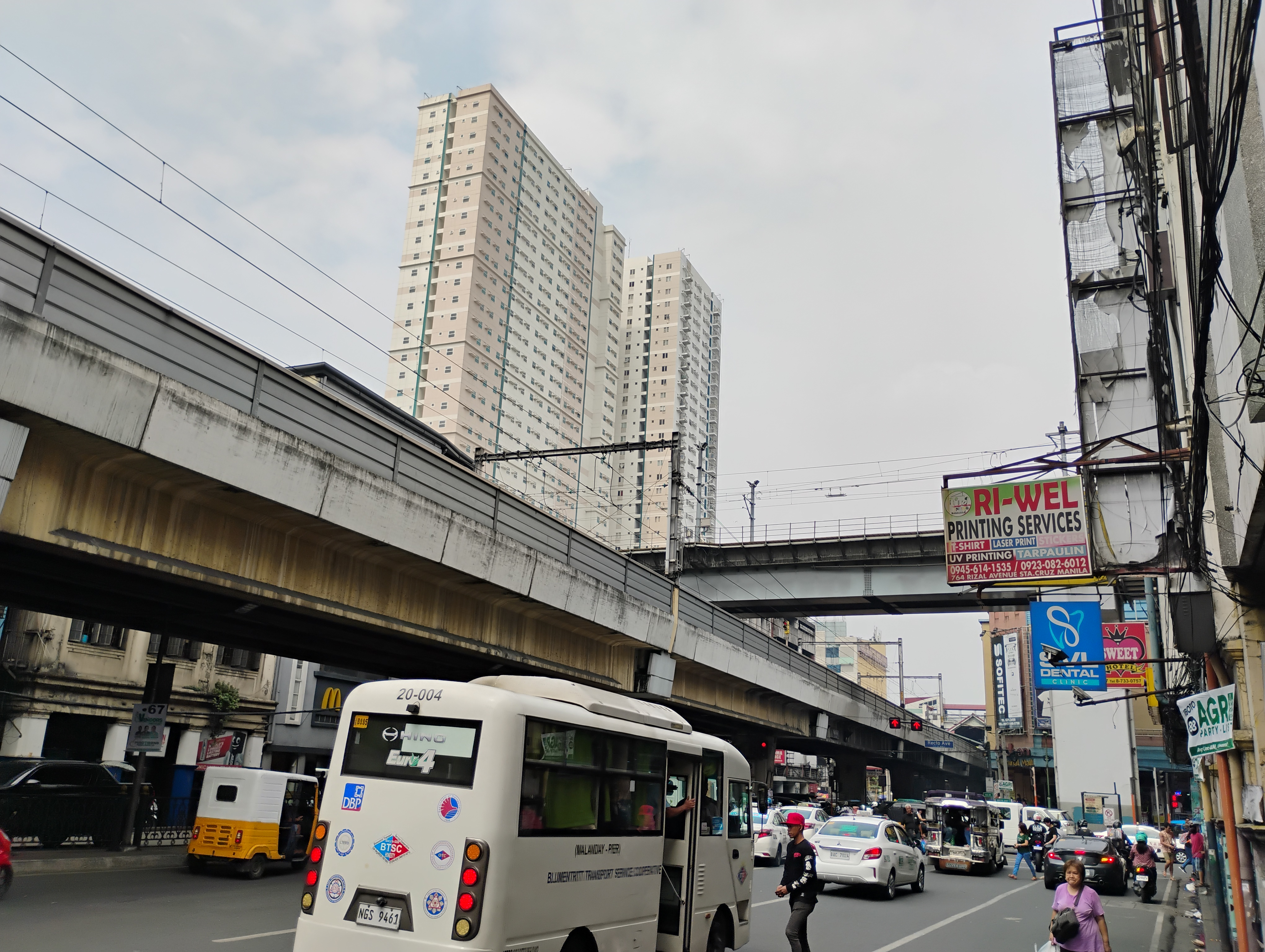
Rizal Avenue-Recto Avenue crossing, showing the viaducts of LRT-1 and LRT-2, in Manila.

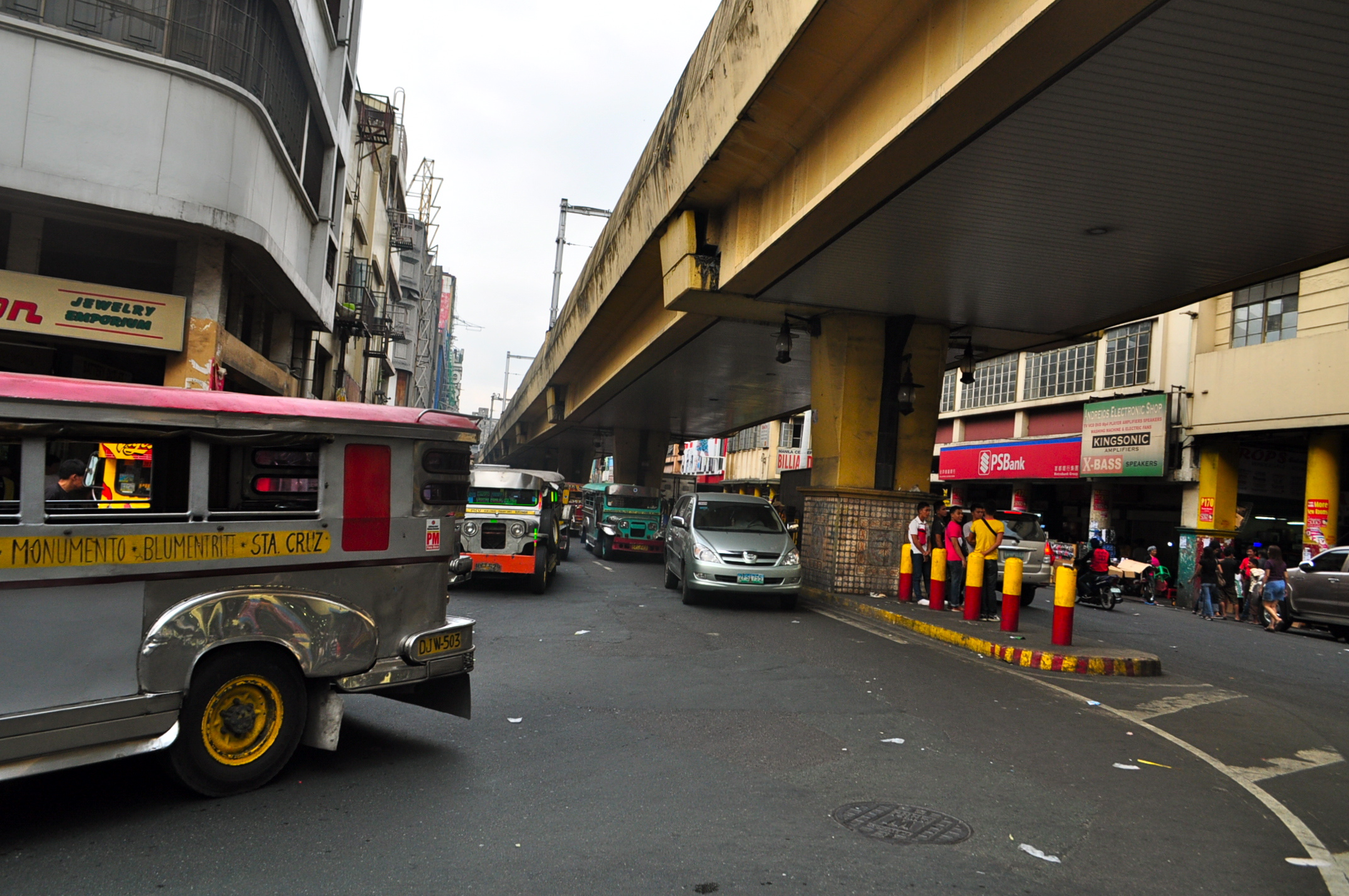
Rizal Avenue corner Ronquillo Street in Manila

Province	City/Municipality	km	mi	Destinations	Notes
Caloocan		9	5.6	AH 26 (N1) (EDSA) / N1 (MacArthur Highway) / AH 26 (N120) (Samson Road)	Bonifacio Monument Circle (Monumento). Northern terminus. Continues northward as MacArthur Highway.
Caloocan				L. Bustamante Street	Northbound only.
Caloocan				12th Avenue	Southbound only.
Caloocan				11th Avenue	Closed Intersection.
Caloocan				10th Avenue	Traffic light intersection.
Caloocan				9th Avenue	Intersection indefinitely closed. Unsignaled intersection.
Caloocan				8th Avenue	Intersection indefinitely closed. Unsignaled intersection.
Caloocan		8	5.0	7th Avenue	Traffic light intersection.
Caloocan				6th Avenue	Unsignaled intersection.
Caloocan				N130 (5th Avenue)	Traffic light intersection. Westbound goes to R-10, eastbound goes to Quezon City.
Caloocan				4th Avenue	Intersection indefinitely closed. Traffic light intersection turned off.
Caloocan				3rd Avenue	Unsignaled intersection.
Caloocan				2nd Avenue	Unsignaled intersection.
Caloocan				1st Avenue	Southbound only.
Manila				Ricardo Papa Street	Traffic light intersection. Southbound only.
Manila				Tabora Street	Southbound only.
Manila				N151 (Abad Santos Avenue), Hermosa Street	Traffic light intersection. Southwest direction goes to Divisoria.
Manila				Mt. Samat Street	Southbound only.
Manila				Samal Street	Southbound only.
Manila		6	3.7	Aurora Boulevard	Traffic light intersection. Access to La Loma and Sampaloc districts.
Manila				Pampanga Street	Traffic light intersection.
Manila				Bulacan Street	Northbound only.
Manila				Sampaguita Street	Northbound only.
Manila				Lico Street, Cavite Street	Traffic Light intersection.
Manila				N160 (Blumentritt Road), Antipolo Street, Old Antipolo Street	Formerly signaled intersection. Northeast direction goes to Aurora Boulevard and Dimasalang Street.
Manila				Laguna Street	Traffic light intersection.
Manila				A. Lorenzo Jr. Street (Batangas Street)	Traffic light intersection.
Manila				Yuseco Street	Traffic light intersection.
Manila		5	3.1	Herrera Street	Unsignaled intersection.
Manila				N140 (Tayuman Street)	Traffic light intersection. Westbound goes to R-10, while eastbound goes to Lacson Avenue.
Manila				Malabon Street	Unsignaled intersection.
Manila				San Lazaro Street	One-way intersection.
Manila		4	2.5	Quiricada Street	Traffic light intersection.
Manila				Alvarez Street	Unsignaled intersection.
Manila				Bambang Street	Traffic light intersection.
Manila		4	2.5	Remigio Street	Traffic light intersection.
Manila		4	2.5	Mayhaligue Street	Unsignaled intersection.
Manila				Fugoso Street	Traffic light intersection.
Manila				Lope de Vega Street	Unsignaled intersection.
Manila		3	1.9	Doroteo Jose Street	Formerly signaled intersection.
Manila		3	1.9	N145 (Claro M. Recto Avenue)	Traffic light intersection. Westbound goes to Divisoria and R-10, while eastbound goes to Sampaloc, San Miguel and Santa Mesa districts.
Manila				Soler Street	Unsignaled intersection.
Manila				Katubusan Street	Southbound only.
Manila				Gonzalo Puyat Street	Unsignaled intersection.
Manila				N150 (Ronquillo Street)	One-way road from Rizal Avenue. All southbound vehicles of Rizal Avenue are diverted to this road.
Manila				Bustos Street	One-way road to Rizal Avenue.
Manila		2	1.2	N150 (Carriedo Street)	Southern terminus.
1.000 mi = 1.609 km; 1.000 km = 0.621 mi: Incomplete access

== Other roads named after Rizal ==
"Rizal Avenue" and its variations, such as "Rizal Street", are among the most common street names in the Philippines. They usually serve as the main street of a town or city. In towns and cities in the Luzon mainland, the street that leads to Manila is usually called "Rizal Street". These include J.P. Rizal Avenue in Makati, Rizal Avenue in Olongapo, and some segments of the Pan-Philippine Highway.

== See also ==
- Standalone movie theaters of the Philippines
- University Belt
