= Abad Santos station =

Train station in Manila, Philippines

Abad Santos
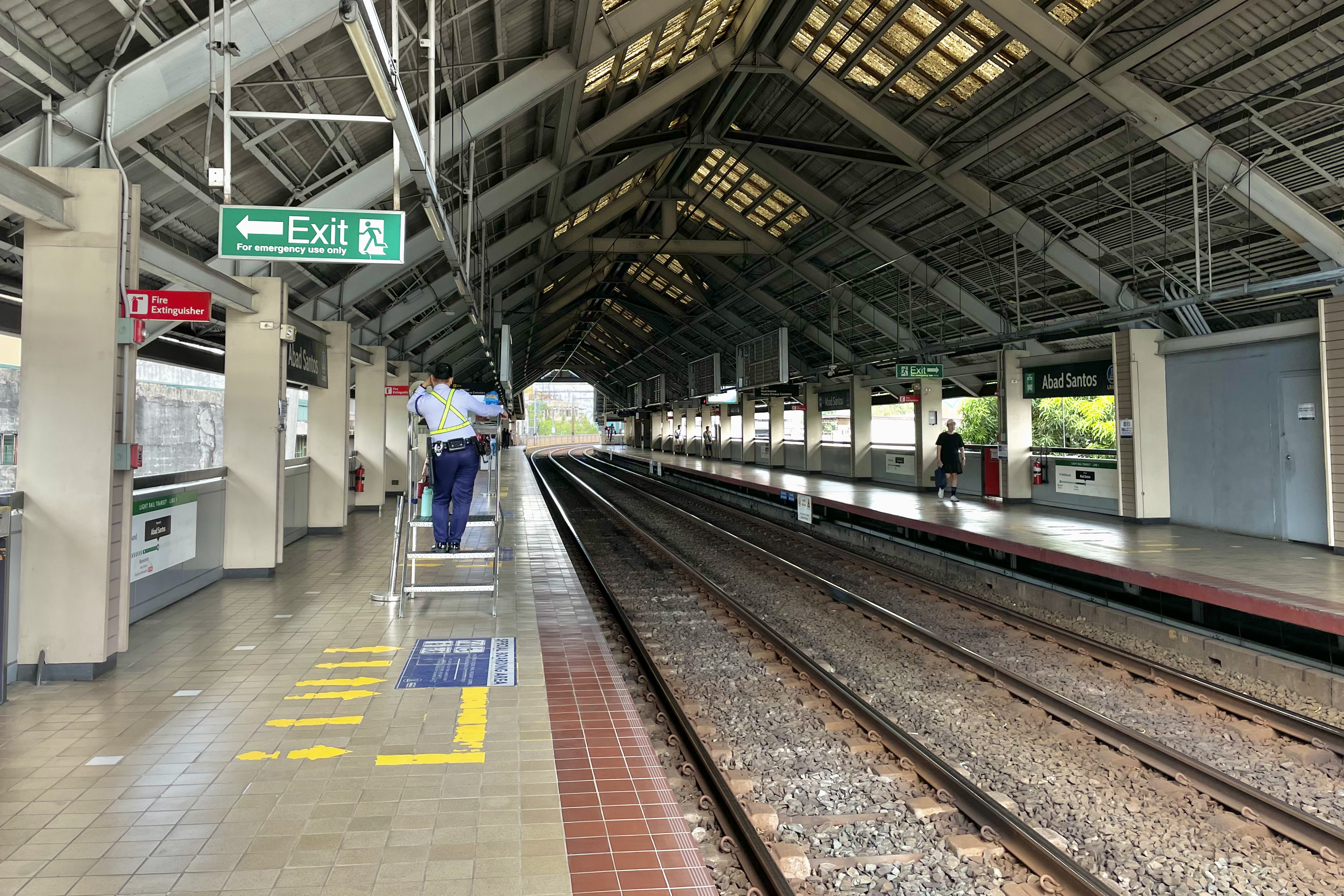
- Station platform in 2026

General information
- Other names: J. Abad Santos
- Location: Rizal Avenue, Tondo; Manila, Metro Manila, Philippines
- Coordinates: 14°37′50.22″N 120°58′53.09″E
- Owner: Department of Transportation; Light Rail Manila Corporation
- Line: LRT Line 1
- Platforms: 2 (2 side)
- Tracks: 2

Construction
- Structure type: Elevated

Other information
- Station code: GL06

History
- Opened: May 12, 1985; 41 years ago

Services
Preceding station	Manila LRT	Following station
R. Papa towards Fernando Poe Jr.	LRT Line 1	Blumentritt towards Dr. Santos
Track layout
Location
- Location within Manila Location within Metro Manila Location within Luzon Location within Philippines

Abad Santos station, also known as J. Abad Santos station, is an elevated Light Rail Transit (LRT) station located on the LRT Line 1 (LRT-1) system in Manila, Philippines. The station serves Tondo and Santa Cruz, and is situated on Rizal Avenue. The station is named after the nearby Abad Santos Avenue, which in turn, is named after José Abad Santos, Chief Justice of the Supreme Court of the Philippines who was executed by the Japanese invading forces during World War II.

Abad Santos station serves as the sixth station for LRT-1 trains headed to Dr. Santos and as the twentieth station for trains headed to Fernando Poe Jr.

== History ==
Abad Santos station was opened to the public on May 12, 1985, as part of the Rizal Line, which extended the LRT northward to Monumento.

== Transportation links ==
Like its neighbor R. Papa, commuters can take the many jeepneys or taxis to Abad Santos station. Buses and UV Express that ply Rizal Avenue also stop near the station. Tricycles are available outside the station.

== See also ==
- List of rail transit stations in Metro Manila
- Manila Light Rail Transit System
- Media related to Abad Santos station at Wikimedia Commons
