= Espiritu Santo Parochial School =

Roman Catholic school in Manila, Philippines

Location
- Santa Cruz, Manila, Metro Manila; Philippines
- Coordinates: 14°37′01″N 120°59′00″E

Information
- Type: Private, Diocesan
- Motto: Veritas et Caritas (Truth and Charity)
- Established: 1947
- Director: Rev. Fr. Nolan A. Que PhD (S.Y. 2014-present) Msgr. Alberto Salonga (S.Y. 2000-2014)
- Grades: K to 12
- Colors: Maroon and Gold
- Affiliations: PAASCU
- Website: www.esps.edu.ph

Espiritu Santo Parochial School is a basic education institution in Santa Cruz, Manila, with a core of faculty members and staff.

== History ==
Espiritu Santo Parochial School (ESPS) was formally established in 1947 by Rev. Fr. William J. Duschak, SVD (School Director, 1947–1951), former Vicar Apostolic of Calapan, Oriental Mindoro. Not long after, the school, then managed by the priests of the Society of the Divine Word (SVD), was officially recognized by the government to offer the complete Elementary course from Grade I to Grade VII courses in 1948 and the Kindergarten course in 1962.

Serving after Fr. Duschak was Fr. Matias Buendgen, SVD (School Director, 1951–1958) who was credited for the construction of the Main Building, which to this day, stands at the corner of Rizal Avenue and Tayuman Street. Blessed by Archbishop Rufino J. Santos in November 1955, the said structure was then described as a “beautiful, imposing edifice” and was considered to be “one of the best parochial school buildings in Manila” during its time.

When Fr. Buendgen left for Germany in 1958, Fr. Antonio Albrecht, SVD, took over as the School Director (served 1958–1973) and it was under his leadership that ESPS grew by “leaps and bounds”. Fr. Albrecht added one more story to the Main Building, which eventually became the School Auditorium. It was also under his administration that the Annex I and II buildings were built in succession with the former in the corner of Tayuman and Oroquieta Streets and the latter at Oroquieta corner Batangas Streets.

In 1973, the SVD Fathers formally turned over ESPS to the diocesan priests, following the transfer of the parish supervision from the said congregation to the Archdiocese of Manila. Msgr. Gorgonio Encarnacion was the first diocesan priest to serve as School Director on 1973–1981. The Religious Missionaries of St. Dominic took over the school's management in 1981 with Sr. Ma. Cristina Castro, O.P. as the first School Directress (served 1981–1982).

Under the vision of the Dominican Sisters, the school initiated the much needed reforms in the curricular offerings and further improved the existing physical facilities to ensure academic excellence, heighten spiritual awareness and create a healthy environment conducive to learning. Thus, the Audio Visual Room was constructed in 1984 and a year after, the Science Laboratory in the Main Building was built. The construction of both facilities were made possible by the Parents Auxiliary Board during the term of Sr. Mary Martires, O.P. as School Directress (served 1982–1985).

Consistent to avowed school aims, ESPS never ceased to upgrade and improve the quality of instruction. The year 1997 under Sr. Ma. Rosalinda Calong, O.P. (School Directress, 1997–2001) saw a myriad of significant changes in the school set-up both in the curricular programs and the physical plant.

To date, the school is equipped with modern facilities: the Instructional Media Center (IMC), computer laboratories, fully air-conditioned offices and classrooms, well-ventilated school cafeterias, electronically catalogued libraries, a functional audio-visual room, a covered catwalk connecting the Main Building and the Annex I, the installation of the MIS (Management Information System) and a Wide Area Network (WAN) Internet.

In 2007, the school prioritized the completion of the five floor Annex II building in Oroquieta Street. By 2008, Annex II, which serves as the Grade School building, was completed. A year after, the covered court/gym located between the Annex I and the Main Building in Tayuman Street was already in use.

Parallel to this face lifting effort is the continuous review and revision of existing school programs and services to ensure the development of the learners.

In 1998, ESPS applied for academic accreditation to the Philippine Accrediting Association of Schools, Colleges and Universities (PAASCU), a “private, voluntary, non-profit and non- stock corporation” that “recognizes academic programs which meet standards of quality education”. PAASCU analyzed and evaluated the school's curriculum, student services, facilities, Faculty and staff development. In August 1999, the school passed the First Preliminary Survey in which the school successfully met its standards and requirements for Level I, thus making the school eligible for Formal Survey. In May 2000, ESPS passed the Formal Survey and was awarded with PAASCU Level I Accreditation.

Consequently, the school was granted the Level II status in May 2002 and was recommended for the Re-Survey three years after. Hence, ESPS prepared for the PAASCU Re-survey accreditation in November and December 2004. By May 2005, both the Grade School and High School Departments were granted Level II re-accreditation for a period of five years. In November 2010, ESPS was granted its latest PAASCU Level II re-accreditation, recognition of the school's continuous work in improving its standards of academic and professional excellence.

It was in March 2000 that the Religious Missionaries of St. Dominic formally entrusted the administration and supervision of ESPS to Manila Archdiocesan and Parochial Schools Association (MAPSA) under the leadership of Msgr. Alberto G. Salonga Jr. (served 2001–2014) as Director and Sr. Ma. Rosalinda F. Calong, O.P as Principal (served 2001–2014).

Through the years, the school community continuously commits itself towards the realization of its vision-mission coupled with a deep sense of dedication and firm resolve by renewing its ties to the Roman Catholic Archdiocese of Manila Educational System (RCAMES) in May 2014 following the formal transfer of supervisory reins from MAPSA to the Roman Catholic Archdiocese of Manila (RCAM).

To date, Rev. Fr. Nolan A. Que, Ph.D. heads ESPS as the School Director / Principal (2014–present). Under his administration, the construction of an eight (8) storey building in Tayuman Street began. This building houses the school parking space, additional classrooms, the canteen extension and a roof deck gymnasium. It was also during the first year of his term that Annex II had its own Audio Visual Room and gymnasium. The school libraries and science laboratories were also renovated during his second year of being the School Director.

In April 2016, Fr. Nolan delegated the responsibility of heading the school to Mr. Benedicto Pascual, M.A. as Principal of Grade School and High School departments, the first lay principal to serve in ESPS.

On the same year, ESPS welcomed the pioneer batch of Senior High School students. The school offered the complete Academic track and the Technical-Vocational Track. Grade 11 students enrolled in the academic strands of Accountancy, Business and Management (ABM), General Academic (GA), Humanities and Social Sciences (HumSS) and Science, Technology, Engineering and Mathematics (STEM). For Technical-Vocational track, ESPS offered the Information, Communications and Technology strand. The pioneer batch of Grade 12 graduated in March 2018 with 281 students.

ESPS hurdled the COVID-19 pandemic of 2020 with a specialized offering of the flexible distance learning curriculum using the blended learning approach. Armed with three years of experience in offering the G Suite for Education in the Senior High School, ESPS complied with the Department of Education's mandate of “no vaccine, no face-to-face classes” for School Year 2020-2021 and called its alternative learning strategy as the Home Education Learning Program or HELP. All pupils and students were required to remain at home while teachers continued teaching them using modules, textbooks, and occasional online teaching sessions. For the first time in more than seven decades, ESPS school buildings were empty of students and teachers for there may be disrupted classes but undisrupted learning must continue.

As of this writing, Fr. Nolan maintains the office of the School Director and continues to lead the school towards its last PAASCU Level II Re-Accreditation survey on 2022.

== Accreditation ==
In 1998, ESPS applied for academic accreditation to the Philippine Accrediting Association of Schools, Colleges and Universities (PAASCU), a “private, voluntary, non-profit and non-stock corporation” that “recognizes academic programs which meet standards of quality education”. PAASCU analyzed and evaluated the school's curriculum, student services, facilities, Faculty and staff development. In August 1999, the school passed the First Preliminary Survey in which it successfully met its standards and requirements for Level I, thus making the school eligible for Formal Survey. In May 2000, ESPS passed the Formal Survey and was awarded with PAASCU Level I Accreditation.

Consequently, the school was granted the Level II status in May 2002 and was recommended for the Re-Survey three years after. Hence, ESPS prepared for the PAASCU Re-survey accreditation in November and December 2004. By May 2005, the Grade School and High School departments were granted Level II re-accreditation for a period of five years. In November 2010, ESPS was granted its latest PAASCU Level II re-accreditation, recognition of the school's continuous work in improving its standards of academic and professional excellence.
