= Abad Santos Avenue =

Street in Manila, Philippines

Coordinates: 14°37′10″N 120°58′40″E

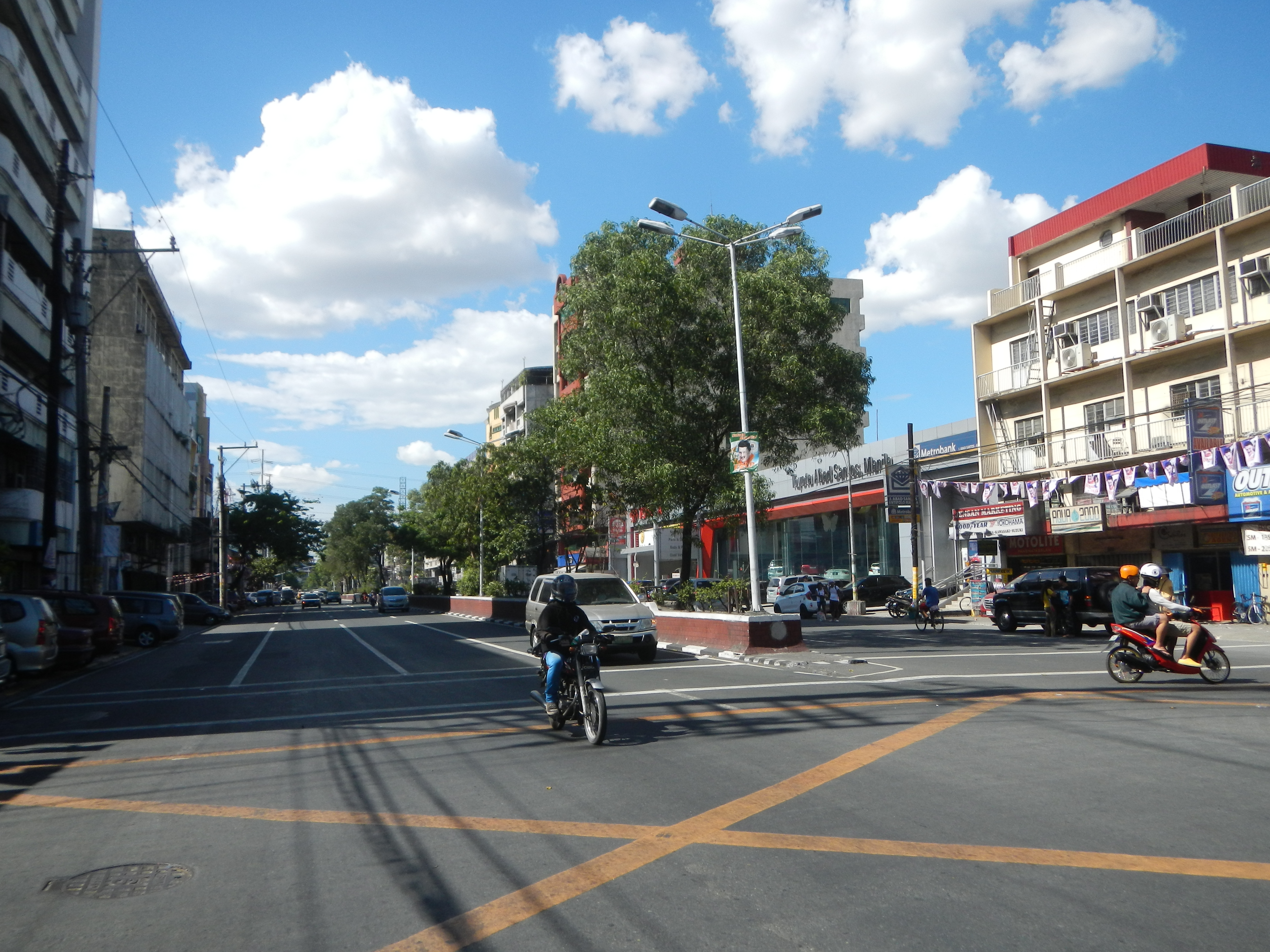
- The intersection of Abad Santos Avenue and Batangas Street in Tondo
- Interactive map of Abad Santos Avenue
- Former names: Calle Palomar; Calle Manuguit
- Namesake: José Abad Santos
- Maintained by: Department of Public Works and Highways - North Manila District Engineering Office
- Length: 3 km (1.9 mi)
- Component highways: N151
- Location: Manila
- North end: N150 (Rizal Avenue)
- Major junctions: N140 (Tayuman Street)
- South end: N145 (Recto Avenue)

Abad Santos Avenue is a major north–south arterial road located in the district of Tondo in northern Manila, Philippines. It is a divided roadway with four lanes in each direction running through the eastern edge of Tondo from the intersection with Rizal Avenue near the Manila Chinese Cemetery at its north end to Recto Avenue near the Tutuban railway station at the district boundary of Tondo and Binondo at the south.

== History ==
Abad Santos Avenue was originally built in the early 19th century under Spanish rule as a narrow residential street in the pueblo of Tondo called Calle Manuguit. The street was believed to have been named after a pre-Hispanic ruling clan of Tondo whose members included Don Agustin Manuguit, a local minister who participated in the Revolt of the Lakans. It was extended south to Barrio Palomar to link with Calle Palomar from just south of Calle Mayhaligue to its terminus at Calle Azcarraga (now Recto Avenue). In 1955, through Republic Act 1256, Manuguit Street was renamed in honor of José Abad Santos, Chief Justice of the Supreme Court of the Philippines, who was executed by the Japanese invading forces during World War II.

== Route ==
Abad Santos Avenue begins at a split from Rizal Avenue just south of Hermosa Street near the San Jose Manggagawa de Manuguit Church and the Manila Chinese Cemetery at Tondo's border with Santa Cruz district. It runs south across the mostly residential area of Manuguit, crossing Solis Street and the Philippine National Railways line at Antipolo Street. The avenue then enters the Tayuman area and intersects with Yuseco Street (formerly Calle Tayabas), Tayuman Street (Calle Morga), and Quiricada Street. South of Bambang Street (Calle Trozo), Abad Santos traverses the Tutuban area that is home to Seng Guan Temple, Chiang Kai Shek College, the Philippine Cultural College, as well as General Hizon Elementary School and Gregorio del Pilar Elementary School. The road ends at the junction with Recto Avenue (Calle Azcarraga), close to the Divisoria shopping district.

Abad Santos Avenue has a short extension into Binondo and Plaza San Lorenzo Ruíz south of Recto Avenue as Reina Regente Street. It is served by Abad Santos station at Rizal Avenue.

== Intersections ==
The entire route is located in Manila.

km	mi	Destinations	Notes
		N150 (Rizal Avenue), Hermosa Street	Northern terminus. Traffic light intersection. Continues north as N150 (Rizal Avenue)
		Morong Street	Unsignaled intersection.
		Dinalupihan Street	Northbound only.
		Corregidor Street	Southbound only.
		Solis Street	Traffic light intersection.
		Tecson Street	Traffic light intersection.
		Antipolo Street, Old Antipolo Street	Traffic light intersection. Railroad crossing.
		Batangas Street	Unsignaled intersection.
		Yuseco Street	Traffic light intersection.
		N140 (Tayuman Street)	Traffic light intersection.
		Villaruel Street	
		Quiricada Street	Traffic light intersection.
		Bambang Street / Bambang Extension	Traffic light intersection.
		G. Araneta Street	Northbound only.
		Mayhaligue Street	Traffic light intersection.
		La Torre Street	
		Padre Algue Street	Traffic light intersection.
		N145 (Claro M. Recto Avenue)	Southern terminus. Traffic light intersection. Continues southward as Reina Regente Street.
1.000 mi = 1.609 km; 1.000 km = 0.621 mi: Incomplete access

== Landmarks ==
This from north (Rizal Avenue) to south (Recto Avenue):

- Philippine Feng Shan Temple
- Ospital ng Tondo
- Estero de Tutuban
- General M. Hizon Elementary School
- Philippine Cultural College
- General Gregorio del Pilar Elementary School

== Photos ==
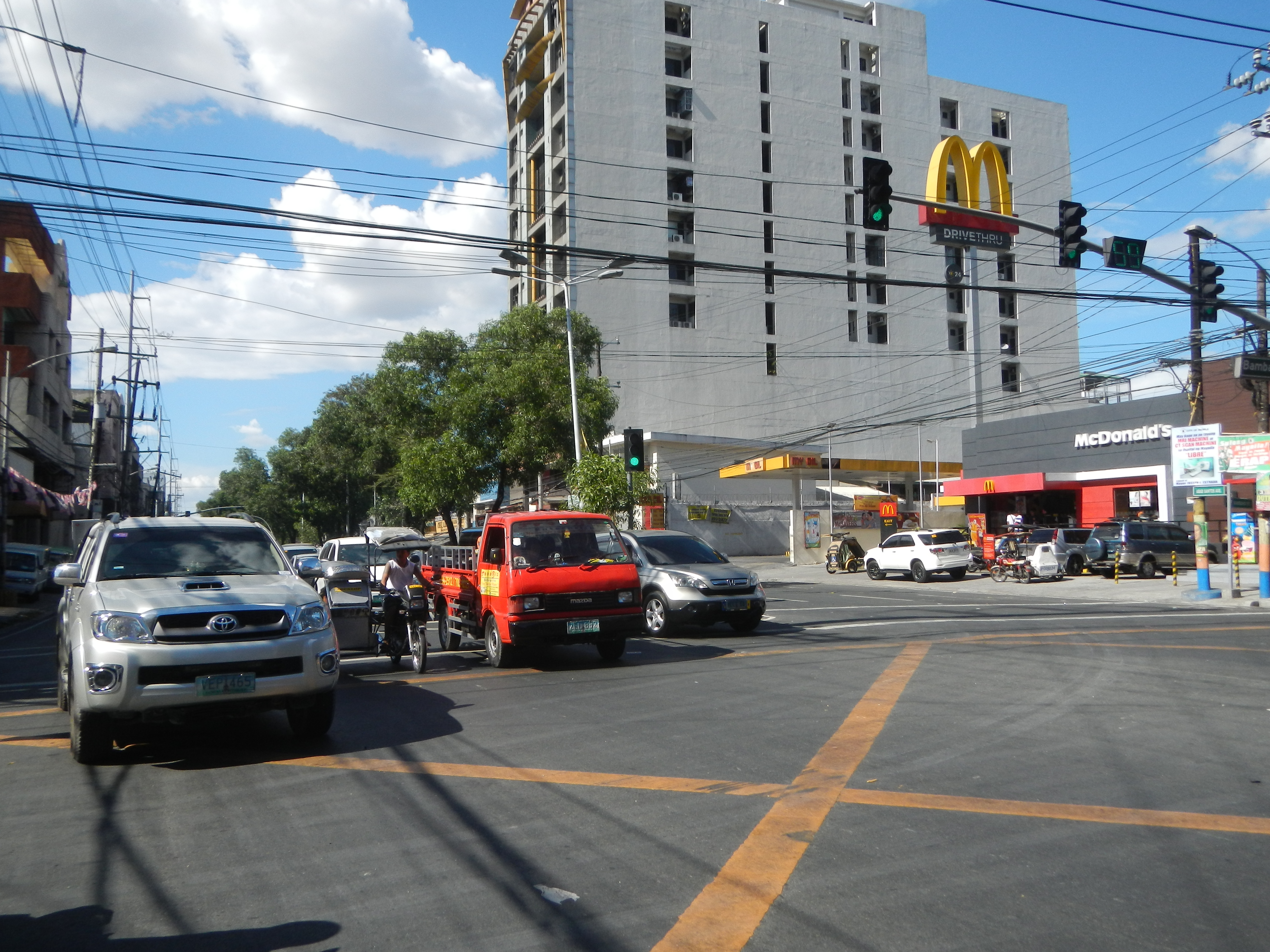
Bambang Street-Abad Santos Avenue intersection

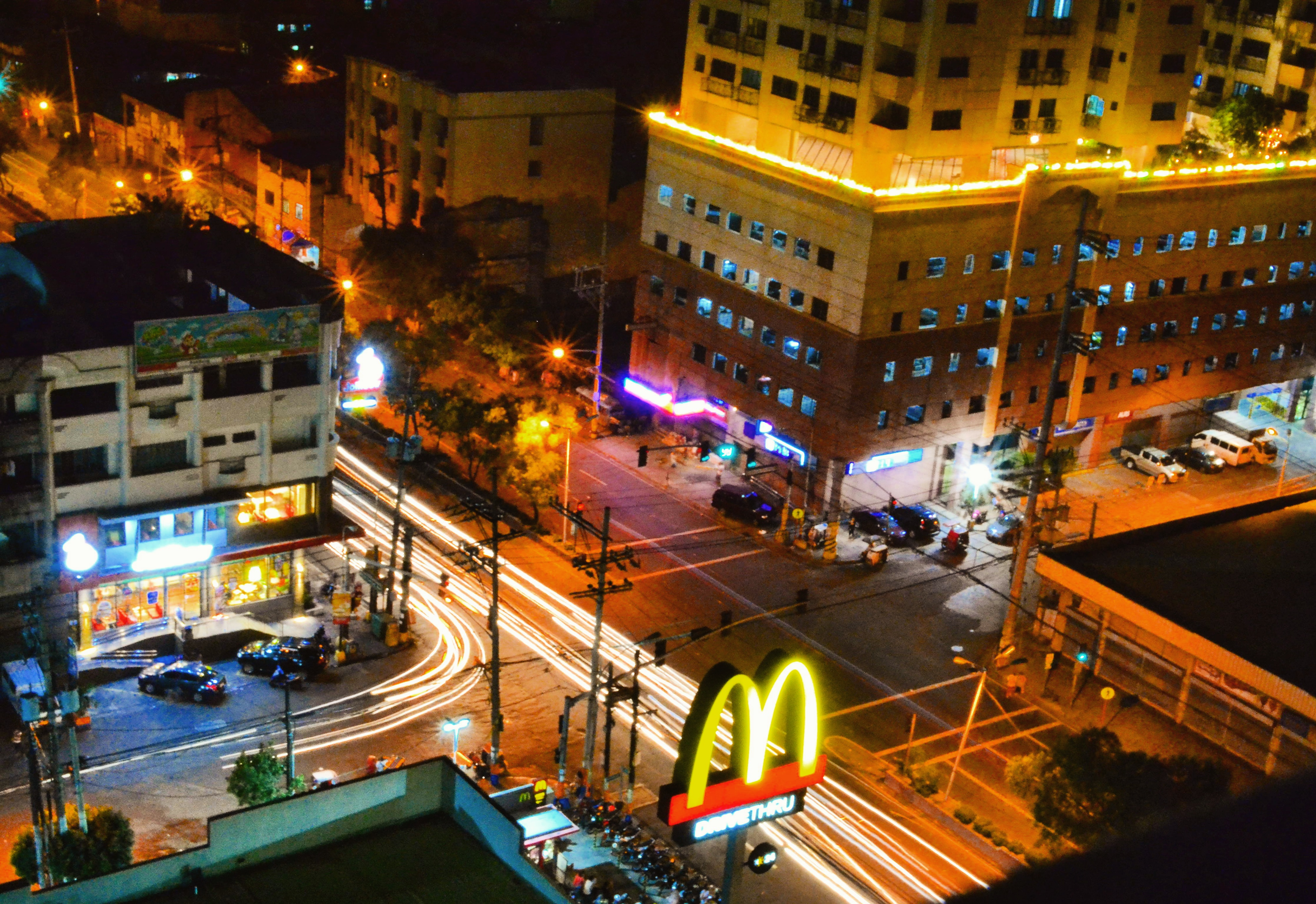
Bambang Street-Abad Santos Avenue intersection at night

Philippine Cultural College in between Recto Avenue and Padre Algue Street

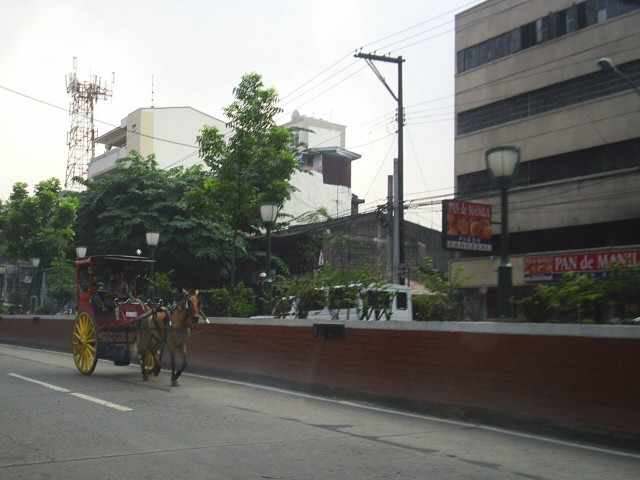
Calesa plying the avenue, near Quiricada Street-Abad Santos Avenue intersection
