= Monumento station =

Train station in Caloocan, Philippines

Yamaha Monumento
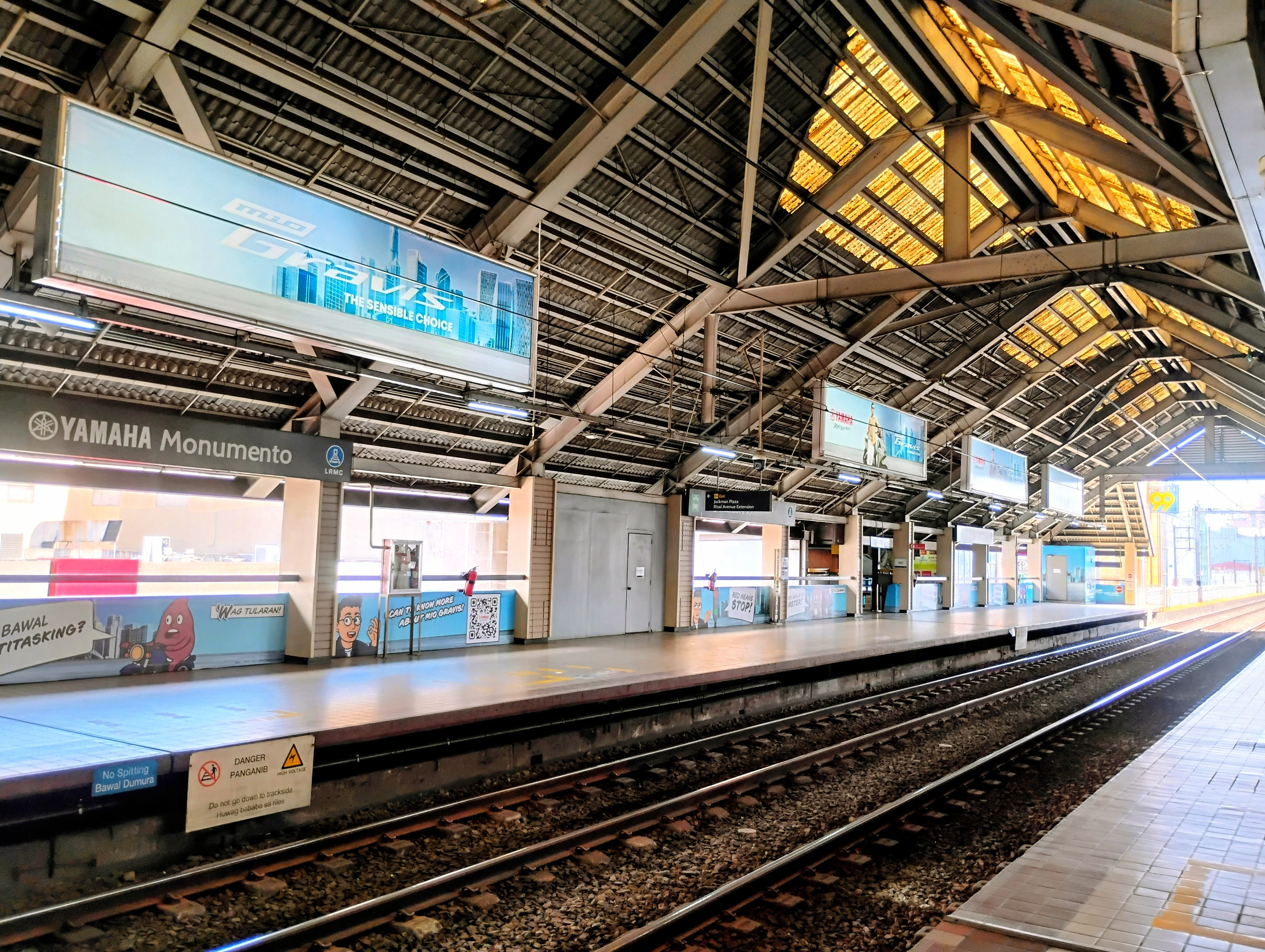

General information
- Other names: Yamaha Monumento
- Location: 706 Rizal Avenue Extension, Grace Park East; Caloocan, Metro Manila, Philippines
- Coordinates: 14°39′14.74″N 120°59′02.06″E
- Owner: Department of Transportation – Light Rail Transit Authority
- Operator: Light Rail Manila Corporation
- Line: LRT Line 1
- Platforms: 2 (2 side)
- Tracks: 2
- Connections: E Monumento; 14 Monumento

Construction
- Structure type: Elevated
- Parking: Yes (SM City Grand Central)
- Accessible: yes

Other information
- Station code: GL03

History
- Opened: May 12, 1985; 41 years ago
- Former names: North Terminal (1985-2010); Monumento Terminal (2010-2017)

Services
Preceding station	Manila LRT	Following station
Balintawak towards Fernando Poe Jr.	LRT Line 1	5th Avenue towards Dr. Santos
Track layout
Location
- Location within Metro Manila Location within Luzon Location within Philippines

Yamaha Monumento station is an elevated Light Rail Transit (LRT) station located on the LRT Line 1 (LRT-1) system in the southern portion of Caloocan. It is named after the most famous landmark of Caloocan, the Monumento Circle, which houses the Bonifacio Monument, a famous monument to Filipino revolutionary Andrés Bonifacio. It opened on May 12, 1985, when LRT-1 became fully operational. Being the northern terminus of LRT-1 until Balintawak was opened in 2010, it is called Monumento Terminal and historically as North Terminal.

Monumento is located on Rizal Avenue in Grace Park West & Grace Park East, Caloocan. It is the third station for trains headed to Dr. Santos, the twenty-third station for trains headed to Fernando Poe Jr., and is one of the two LRT-1 stations in Caloocan, the other being 5th Avenue.

LRTA has modified two tracks at Monumento leading to Balintawak, Fernando Poe Jr., and North Triangle Common stations.

It underwent renovations in September 2017 and was relaunched on February 14, 2018, as Yamaha Monumento station as Light Rail Manila Corporation entered into a naming rights deal with Yamaha Motor Philippines.

== Transportation and building links ==
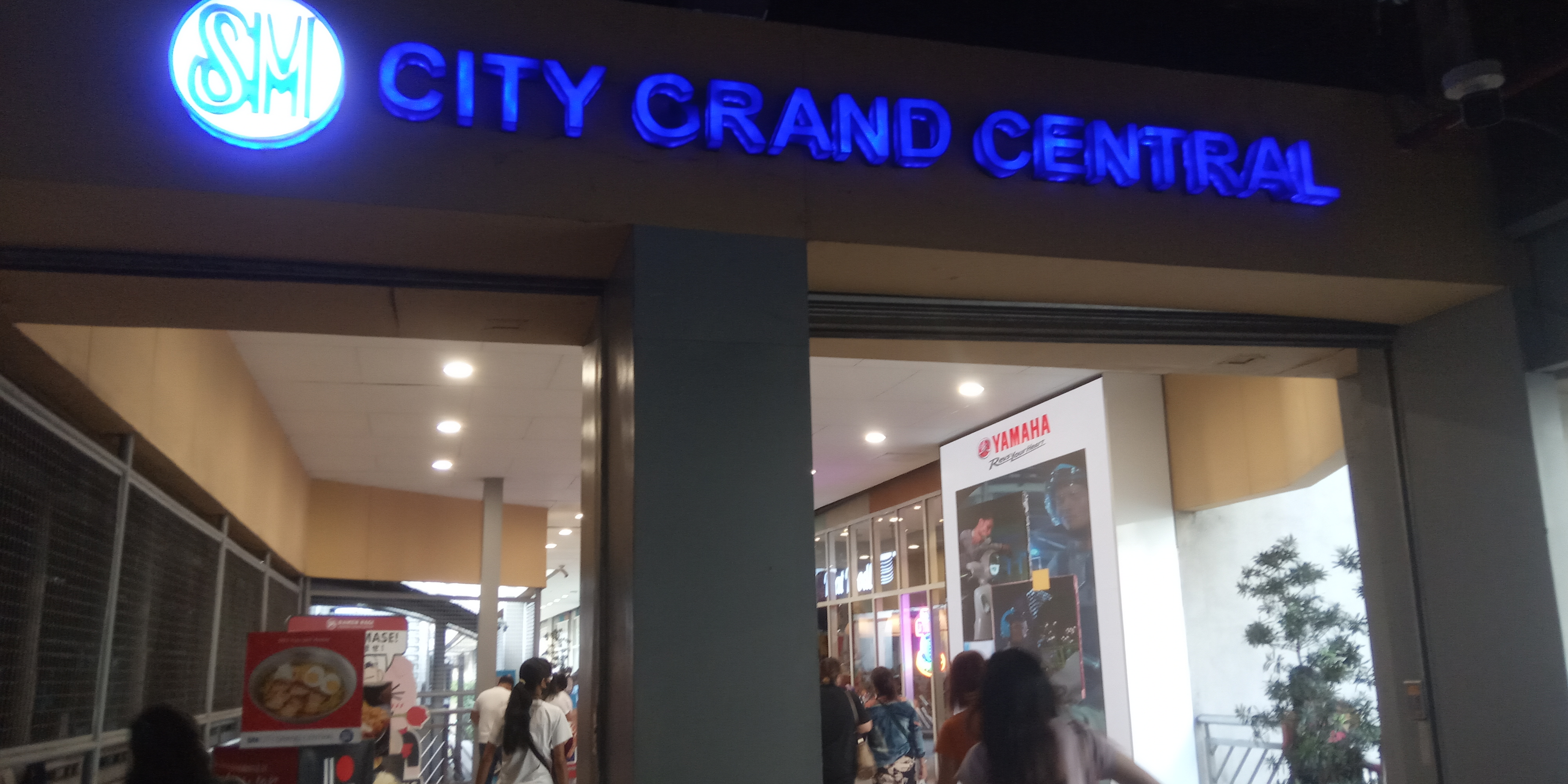
Entrance to SM City Grand Central

The station serves as a terminal and transfer point for several bus and jeepney routes serving the cities of Manila, Caloocan, Malabon, Navotas, and Valenzuela via Rizal Avenue Extension, Samson Road, and MacArthur Highway. Major provincial bus companies also have their own terminals right outside the station like Victory Liner, First North Luzon Transit, and RJ Express.

There was a proposal to extend the Manila Metro Rail Transit System Line 3, or MRT-3, to Monumento, which would result in both stations being linked and Monumento terminal becoming a transfer point between LRT-1 and MRT-3. However, those plans have been shelved in favor of an extension of the LRT-1 Line towards the North Triangle Common Station over the same routing as the previous MRT-3 proposal.

The station is directly linked to SM City Grand Central, which replaced the former Ever Gotesco Grand Central that burned down. The station's east gate and platform are directly connected to the LRT Caloocan Mall.

A bus stop of the EDSA Carousel, also named Monumento, is located nearby along EDSA.

== See also ==
- List of rail transit stations in Metro Manila
- Manila Light Rail Transit System
