= Blumentritt =

Blumentritt is a German surname. Notable people with the surname include:

- Ferdinand Blumentritt (1853–1913), Austrian ethnographer
- Günther Blumentritt (1892–1967), German general
- Volker Blumentritt (born 1946), German politician

== See also ==
- Blumentritt Road
- Blumentritt LRT Station
- Blumentritt railway station
