= St. Lino Science High School =

Private high school in Manila, Philippines

Location
- 478 Manga Ave, Sampaloc; Manila; Philippines

Information
- Type: Private, Nonsectarian
- Established: 2005; 21 years ago
- President: Rev. Choi Chang-Hoan
- Staff: Hon. Carla Buenaventura, Elizabeth Menil
- Gender: Co-educational
- Enrollment: Junior and Senior High School (Grades 7-12)
- Colors: Yellow and Blue
- Team name: Linoans
- Website: www.mtcslshs.edu.ph

St. Lino Science High School (SLSHS), formerly established as the Young Rac Science High School, is a private, non-sectarian secondary educational institution located at 478 Manga Ave., Sampaloc, Manila, Philippines. The school was founded in 2005 by South Korean missionaries to the Philippines under the direction of the Rev. Paulino C. Choi, who previously established the Metro Manila Theological College in 1987.

== Campus ==
In 2013, the United Asian Missionary group completed construction on a 10-story facility to consolidate its affiliated institutions. The building houses St. Lino Science High School alongside the Manila Theological College and the MTC College of Medicine.
