= Laon Laan station =

Railway station in Manila, Philippines

Laon Laan
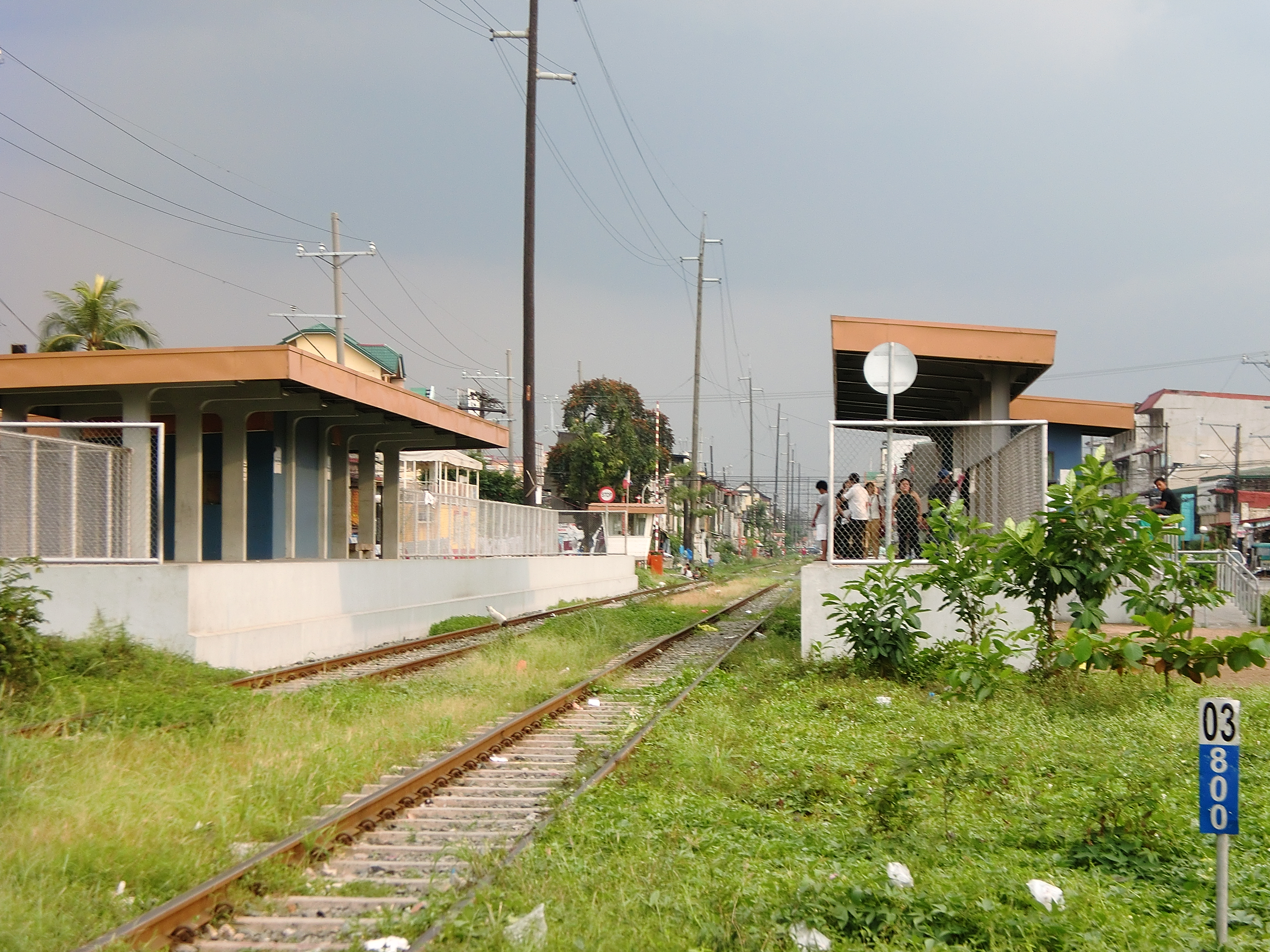
- Exterior of Laon Laan station

General information
- Location: Laon Laan Street, Sampaloc, Manila
- Coordinates: 14°37′0.45″N 120°59′33.53″E
- Owner: Philippine National Railways
- Operator: Philippine National Railways
- Lines: Former: South Main Line; Planned: South Commuter
- Platforms: Side platforms
- Tracks: 2
- Connections: Jeepneys, tricycles

Construction
- Accessible: yes

Other information
- Status: Closed
- Station code: LLN

History
- Opened: January 23, 1978
- Closed: March 27, 2024

Services
Preceding station	PNR	Following station
Blumentritt towards Tutuban	Metro South Commuter	España towards IRRI
Location
- Location within Manila Location within Metro Manila Location within Luzon Location within Philippines

Laon Laan station (also called Dapitan station) was a railway station located on the South Main Line in the city of Manila, Philippines.

The station is the third station from Tutuban.

The station was transferred west of Laon Laan due to the construction of the NLEX Connector Road beside the westbound railtracks, with a steel platform being prepared as its temporary replacement. On 17 October 2023, the station officially reopened.

After the permanent closure of the PNR Metro Commuter service on 28 March 2024, Laon Laan station is not expected to be rebuilt for the Clark–Calamba Railway project.

== Nearby landmarks ==
Major landmarks near the station include the Dangwa flower market, the University of Santo Tomas and SM City San Lazaro, though it requires a commute to reach those.
