= Blumentritt station (LRT) =

Train station in Manila, Philippines

Blumentritt
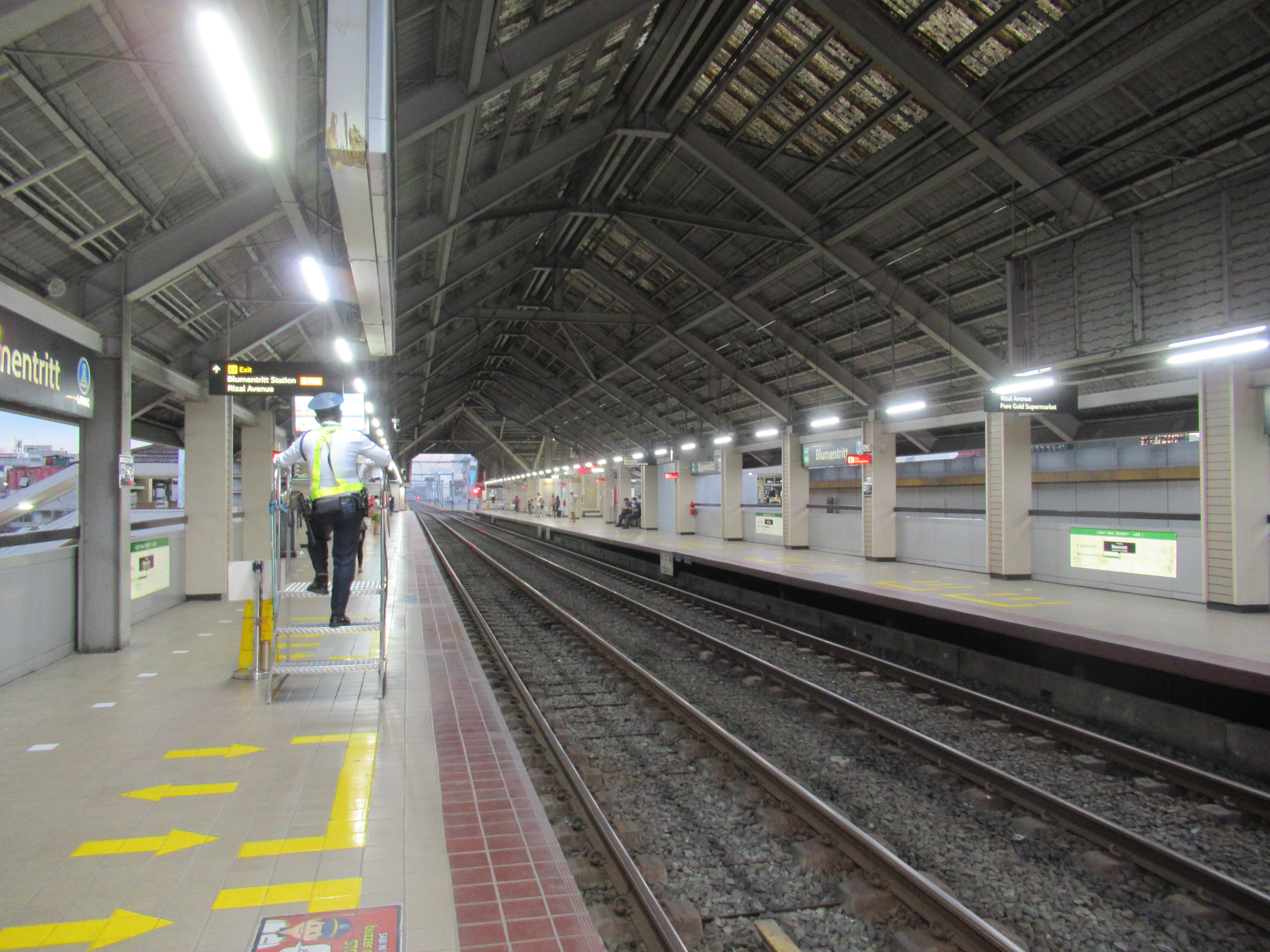

General information
- Location: Rizal Avenue, Santa Cruz and Tondo; Manila, Metro Manila, Philippines
- Coordinates: 14°37′21.82″N 120°58′58.4″E
- Owner: Department of Transportation; Light Rail Manila Corporation
- Line: LRT Line 1
- Platforms: 2 (2 side)
- Tracks: 2
- Connections: Blumentritt

Construction
- Structure type: Elevated

Other information
- Station code: GL07

History
- Opened: May 12, 1985; 41 years ago

Services
Preceding station	Manila LRT	Following station
Abad Santos towards Fernando Poe Jr.	LRT Line 1	Tayuman towards Dr. Santos
Out-of-station interchange
Preceding station	PNR	Following station
Solis towards Clark International Airport	NSCR Commuter CIA–Calamba	España towards Calamba
Tutuban Terminus	NSCR Commuter Tutuban–Calamba	España towards Calamba
Caloocan towards Clark International Airport	Commuter Express CIA–Calamba	España towards Calamba
Tutuban Terminus	Commuter Express Tutuban–Calamba	España towards Calamba
Track layout
Location
- Location within Manila Location within Metro Manila Location within Luzon Location within Philippines

Blumentritt station is an elevated Light Rail Transit (LRT) station located on the LRT Line 1 (LRT-1) system in Manila, Philippines. The station is situated above Rizal Avenue, particularly at its intersections with Old Antipolo Street and Blumentritt Road, from which the station's name is derived. The latter is named to honor Bohemian professor Ferdinand Blumentritt, one of José Rizal's closest associates and a sympathizer of the Propaganda Movement.

Blumentritt station serves as the seventh station for LRT-1 trains headed to Dr. Santos, and the nineteenth station for trains headed to Fernando Poe Jr. It is one of the six Line 1 stations serving Santa Cruz district, along with Abad Santos, Tayuman, Bambang, Doroteo Jose, and Carriedo.

It is the second northernmost station on Rizal Avenue as the line shifts to Rizal Avenue Extension northwest of Abad Santos station.

== History ==
Blumentritt station was opened to the public on May 12, 1985, as part of the Rizal Line, which extended the LRT northward to Monumento. The station is one of the locations where a bomb exploded in a train cab on December 30, 2000, during the Rizal Day bombings that caused 22 fatalities and injuries to around 100.

== Transportation links ==
A Philippine National Railways (PNR) station with the same name exists just a short walk from the station. Buses, jeepneys and taxis that ply Rizal Avenue and nearby routes stop at Blumentritt station, where there is a nearby transportation terminal. Numerous tricycles could also be found near the station, servicing quick transportation from people disembarking from the station and from the jeepneys. The station will be linked to the upcoming North–South Commuter Railway.

== See also ==
- List of rail transit stations in Metro Manila
- Manila Light Rail Transit System
- Media related to Blumentritt station (LRT) at Wikimedia Commons
