= Bambang station =

Train station in Manila, Philippines

Coordinates: 14°36′40″N 120°58′57″E

Bambang
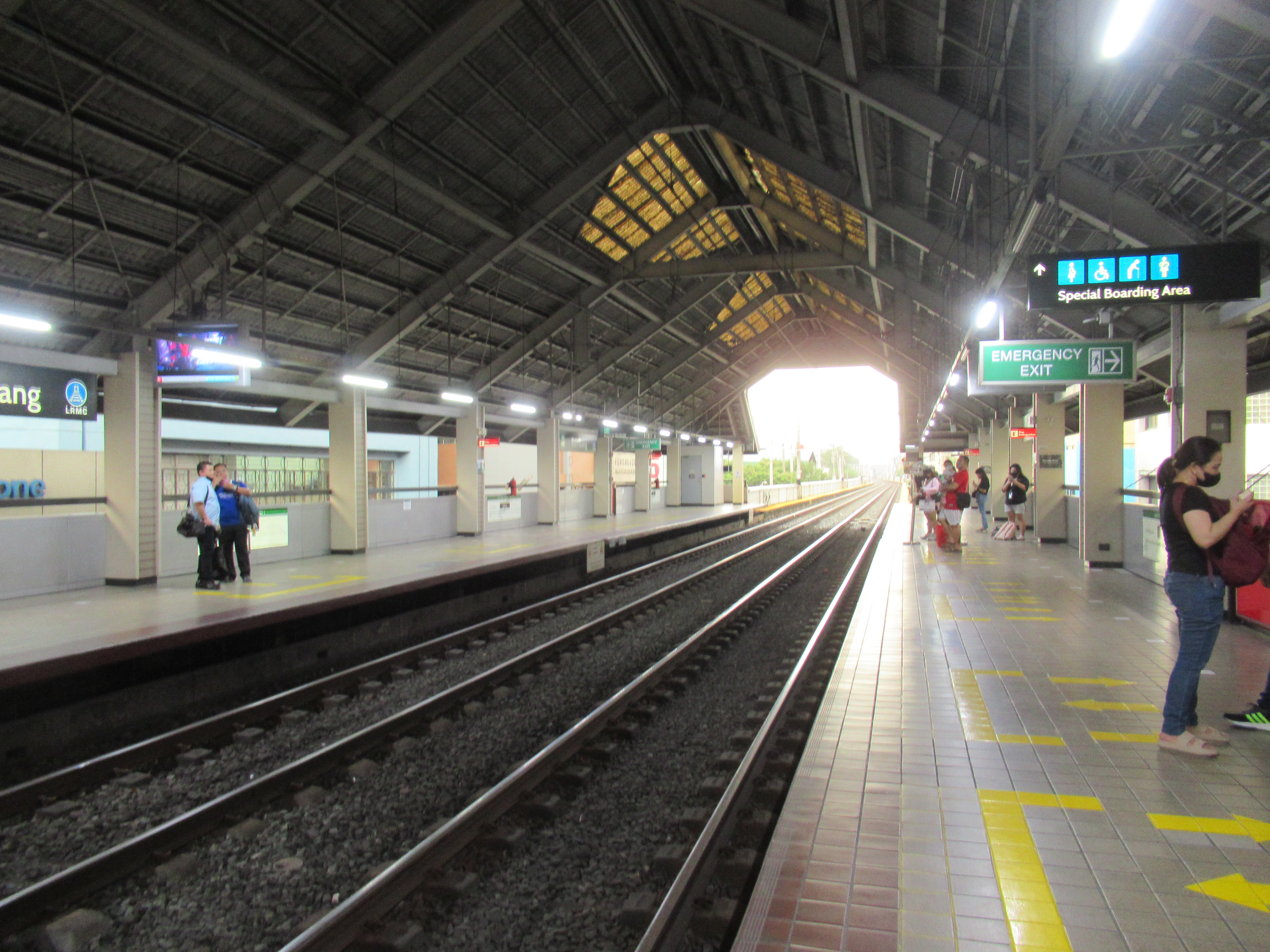

General information
- Location: 1367 Rizal Avenue, Santa Cruz; Manila, Metro Manila, Philippines
- Owner: Department of Transportation; Light Rail Manila Corporation
- Line: LRT Line 1
- Platforms: 2 (2 side)
- Tracks: 2

Construction
- Structure type: Elevated

Other information
- Station code: GL09

History
- Opened: May 12, 1985; 41 years ago

Services
Preceding station	Manila LRT	Following station
Tayuman towards Fernando Poe Jr.	LRT Line 1	Doroteo Jose towards Dr. Santos
Track layout
Location
- Location within Manila Location within Metro Manila Location within Luzon Location within Philippines

Bambang station is an elevated Light Rail Transit (LRT) station located on the LRT Line 1 (LRT-1) system in Santa Cruz, Manila. The station is situated on the intersection of Rizal Avenue and Bambang Street, where the station got its name.

Bambang station serves as the ninth station for trains headed to Dr. Santos and the seventeenth station for trains headed to Fernando Poe Jr. It is notable for having a commercial hub for medical and laboratory supplies within its vicinity.

== History ==
Bambang station was opened to the public on May 12, 1985, as part of the Rizal Line, which extended the LRT northward to Monumento.

== Transportation links ==
Commuters can take the many jeepneys, tricycles and taxis from Bambang station towards their destinations in the Manila, especially the districts of Quiapo, Santa Cruz, Sampaloc and Tondo. The station is also served by buses plying Rizal Avenue.

== See also ==
- List of rail transit stations in Metro Manila
- Manila Light Rail Transit System
