= Dominican School Manila =

Roman Catholic school in Manila, Philippines

Location
- 1044 A.H. Lacson Avenue; Sampaloc Manila; Philippines; 14°36′42″N 120°59′28″E

Information
- Type: Private Catholic basic education institution
- Motto: Latin: Laudare, Benedicere, Praedicare; English: To Praise, To Bless, To Preach
- Religious affiliations: Catholic Church (Mission Sisters)
- Patron saint: St. Dominic De Guzman
- Established: 1958; 68 years ago
- Founder: Congregation of the Religious Missionaries of St. Dominic
- Principal: Sr. Marietta Badua, O.P.
- Grades: N to 12
- Campus type: Urban
- Newspaper: The Dominican Herald
- Affiliations: ACUCA; PAASCU
- Website: www.dominican.edu.ph

Dominican School Manila, founded in 1958, is a private Catholic basic education institution run by the Congregation of the Religious Missionaries of St. Dominic in Sampaloc, Manila, Philippines. The school is located near the University of Santo Tomas. DSM is also one of the schools, colleges and universities that opened its door to the Senior High School enrollees in 2016. These students were assisted by the Voucher Program of the Department of Education and the Fund for Assistance to Private Education (FAPE).

The school was founded in June 1958 by the Mission Sisters in response to the need to provide Catholic education to the children who live in the vicinity of UST. More equipment and materials were procured for the use of the pupils and the staff. Academic programs were evaluated and revised. Assignments and teaching loads were also examined to find out whether the pupils were receiving the best instruction. In School Year 2006-2007, DSM started classes for the secondary education classes in the newly constructed seven-story building. In June 2010, DSM made the decision to adapt the Alternative Learning System Program to assist out-of-school youths who desire to finish Basic Education. Now the campus is closed due to the pandemic, and its students instead learn through SCHOOLOGY for grade school students, ARALINKS for high school students, a website to continue their education.

== History ==
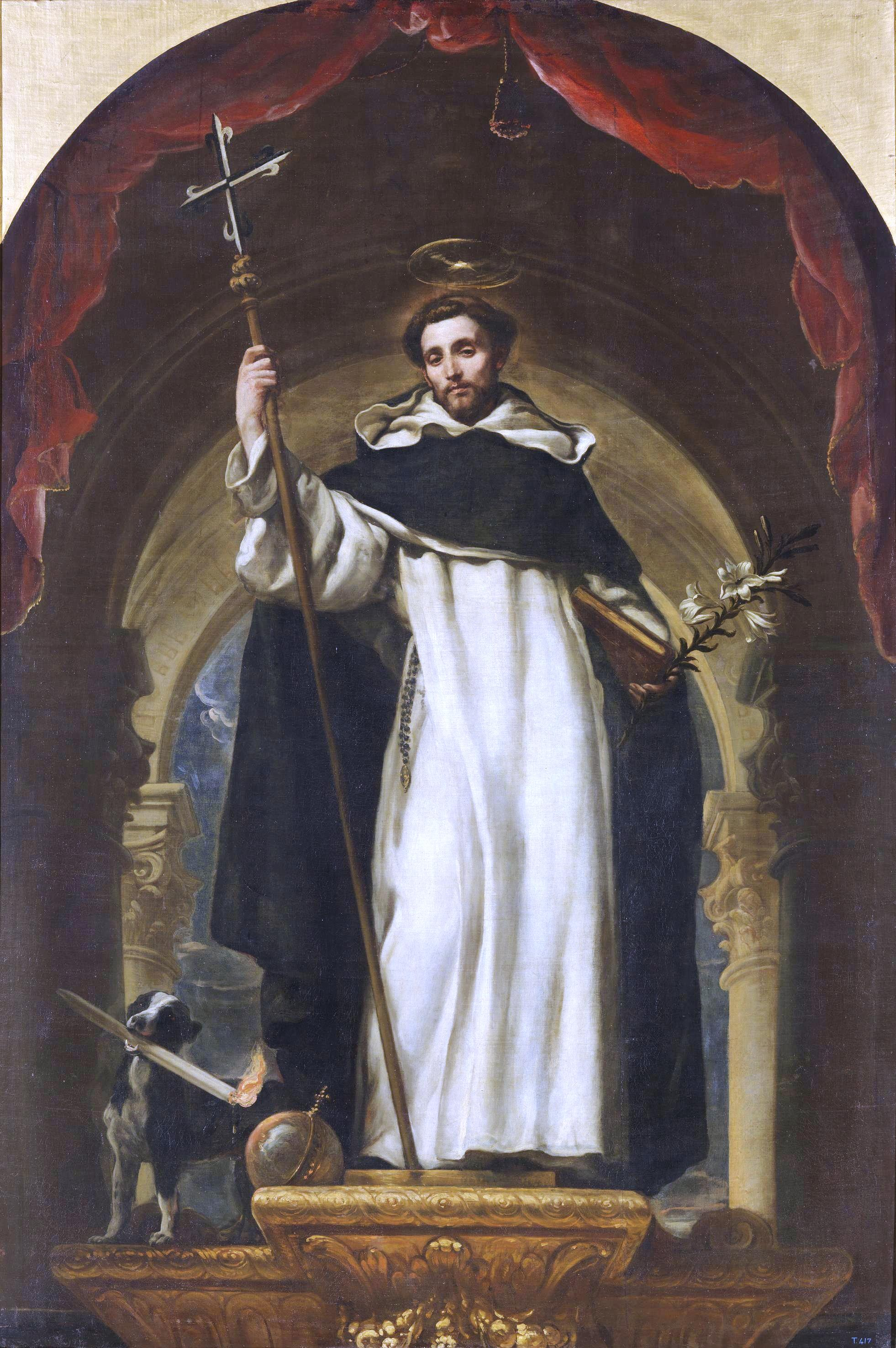
Saint Dominic De Guzman

=== Development ===
The school was founded in June 1958 by the Religious Missionaries of St. Dominic in response to the need to provide Catholic education to the children who live in the vicinity of UST, particularly its employees. Under the leadership of Sr. Jesus Ibargoitia, OP, the superior of Sta. Catalina Girls' Dormitory and Sr. Esperanza Melgar, OP the secretary general, a two-room structure was constituted in May 1958.

A month later, the school opened St. Dominic's Kindergarten School with 79 boys and girls as enrollees.

In 1963, this structure was demolished to give way to the construction of a two-storey concrete building that can accommodate pupils from kindergarten to grade IV. From a thousand pupils in 1964, its population in 1996 increased.

In 1967, the school's name was changed to Dominican School, the name by which all congregation-owned schools are known in compliance with a directive of the DRMSD chapter of 1965. That year was marked by further improvements in the school's academic standard and engagement in an outreach program of providing catechetical institution to public school children in the neighborhood on Sundays. Towards the end of 1973, the school erected 18 more classrooms.

A community of sisters who will manage the school solely was also created between 1976 and 1979. Prior to this, the school and the Sta. Catalina Girl's Dormitory (now Sta. Catalina Ladies' Residence) were managed as one.

In 1987, the administrative building was renovated into a four-storey building with a gymnasium at the top floor. It also provided adequate living quarters for the Dominican community.

On October 14, 1996, the cornerstone for a three-storey building was laid. The Building was another way of upgrading the services offered by the school. This building housed the school canteen and other offices.

More equipment and materials were procured for the use of the pupils and the staff. Academic programs were evaluated and revised. Assignments and teaching loads were also examined to find out whether the pupils were receiving the best instruction.

Additional personnel for the library, guidance office, canteen and teaching staff were also hired. DS continues to improve its facilities, and its academic program inspired by St. Dominic and guided by their shared mission of promoting the integral formation of the youths.

In School Year 2006-2007, DSM started operations for the secondary level in the newly constructed seven-story building. This is in response to the request of our parents and student who wanted to finish their education in their alma mater. In June 2010, DSM made the decision to adapt the Alternative Learning System Program to assist out-of-school youths who desire to finish Basic Education.

By June 2015, the school was also able to support a number of Grade 7 Students through the ESC Voucher Program sponsored by the national government and the Fund for Assistance to Private Education (FAPE).

DSM is also one of the schools, colleges and universities that opened its door to the Senior High School enrollees in 2016. These students were assisted by the Voucher Program of the Department of Education and the Fund for Assistance to Private Education (FAPE).

During the pandemic, the campus was temporarily closed and its students were instead instructed through SCHOOLOGY for grade school students, ARALINKS for high school students, a website to continue their education.

=== Motto ===
The words Laudare, Benedicere and Praedicare simply reiterate the Dominican's modus viventi of soaking oneself with the Spirit of God (laudare) and letting this permeate to all his/her works (benedicere ) and his/her words and witness (praedicare)

=== Seal ===
The school seal consists of a cross on a shield with a star on top surrounded by the words: Laudare, Benedicere and Praedicare. The entire seal is composed in sharply contrasting light and dark colors. The cross occupies the very center of the seal. It means that the school maintains Jesus Christ and his gospel as its center.

== Notable alumni ==
In the Entertainment World

- Sarah Geronimo
- Angeline Quinto
- Eula Valdez
- Esang De Torres
