= España station =

PNR Southrail stop in Manila

España
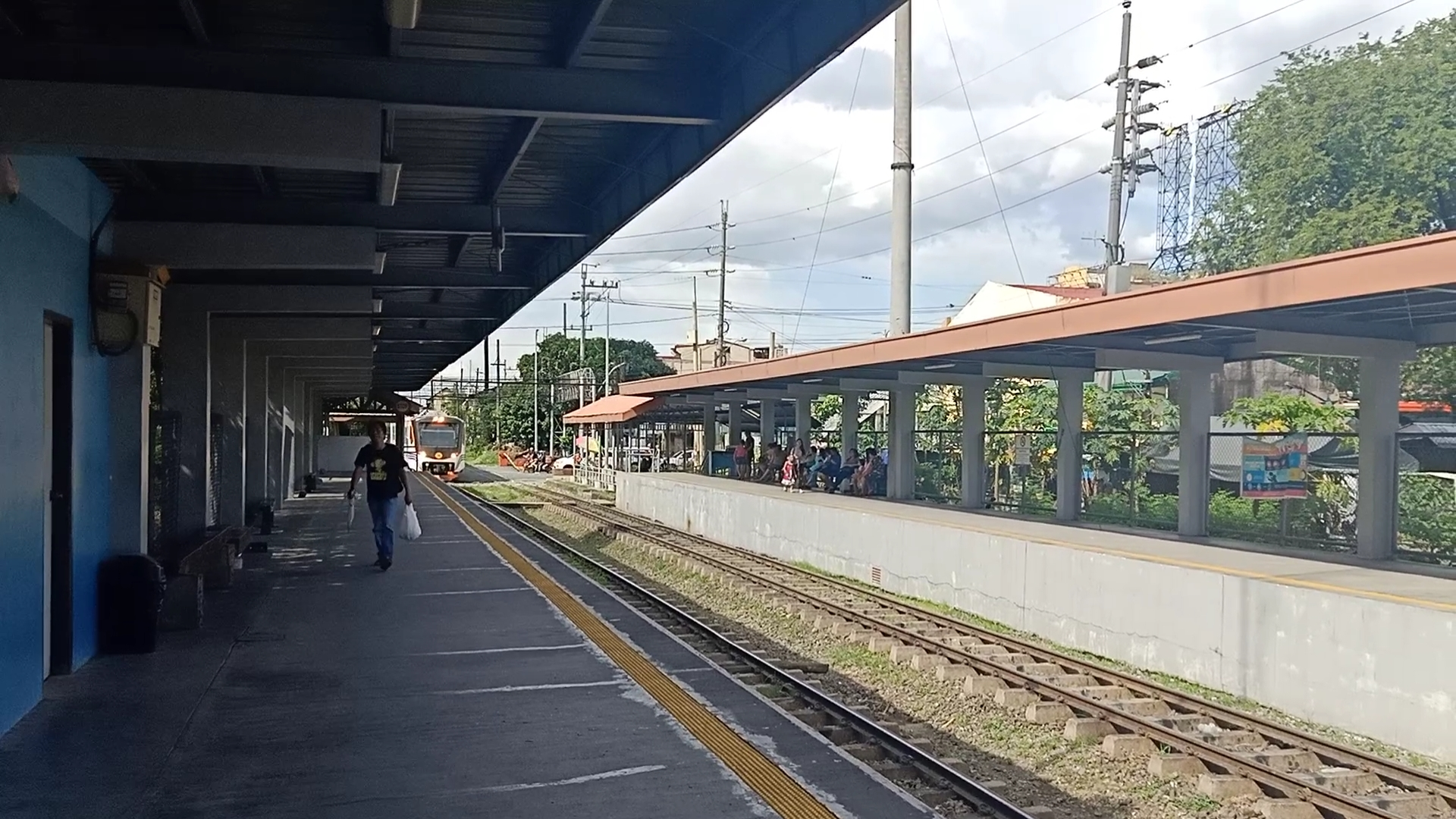
- España station platforms in December 2019.

General information
- Location: España Boulevard, Sampaloc; Manila, Metro Manila; Philippines
- Coordinates: 14°36′43.96″N 120°59′48.82″E
- Owner: Philippine National Railways
- Operator: Philippine National Railways
- Lines: South Main Line; Planned: South Commuter
- Platforms: Side platforms
- Tracks: 2
- Connections: Buses, jeepneys, UV Express, cycle rickshaws Future: 8 Antipolo

Construction
- Structure type: At grade
- Accessible: yes

Other information
- Status: Closed
- Station code: SPÑ

History
- Opened: 1977
- Rebuilt: 1990, 2009

Services
Preceding station	PNR	Following station
Blumentritt towards Governor Pascual	North Shuttle	Santa Mesa towards Bicutan
Laon Laan towards Tutuban	Metro South Commuter	Santa Mesa towards IRRI
Blumentritt towards Tutuban	Bicol Express	Pasay Road towards Legazpi
Future services
Preceding station	PNR	Following station
Blumentritt towards Clark International Airport	NSCR Commuter CIA–Calamba	Santa Mesa towards Calamba
Blumentritt towards Tutuban	NSCR Commuter Tutuban–Calamba	Santa Mesa towards Calamba
Blumentritt towards Clark International Airport	Commuter Express CIA–Calamba	Santa Mesa towards Calamba
Blumentritt towards Tutuban	Commuter Express Tutuban–Calamba	Santa Mesa towards Calamba
Location
- Location within Manila Location within Metro Manila Location within Luzon Location within Philippines

España station is a railway station located on the South Main Line in the city of Manila, Philippines. It derives its name from its location on España Boulevard.

The station is the third station for trains headed south from Tutuban.

== Nearby landmarks ==
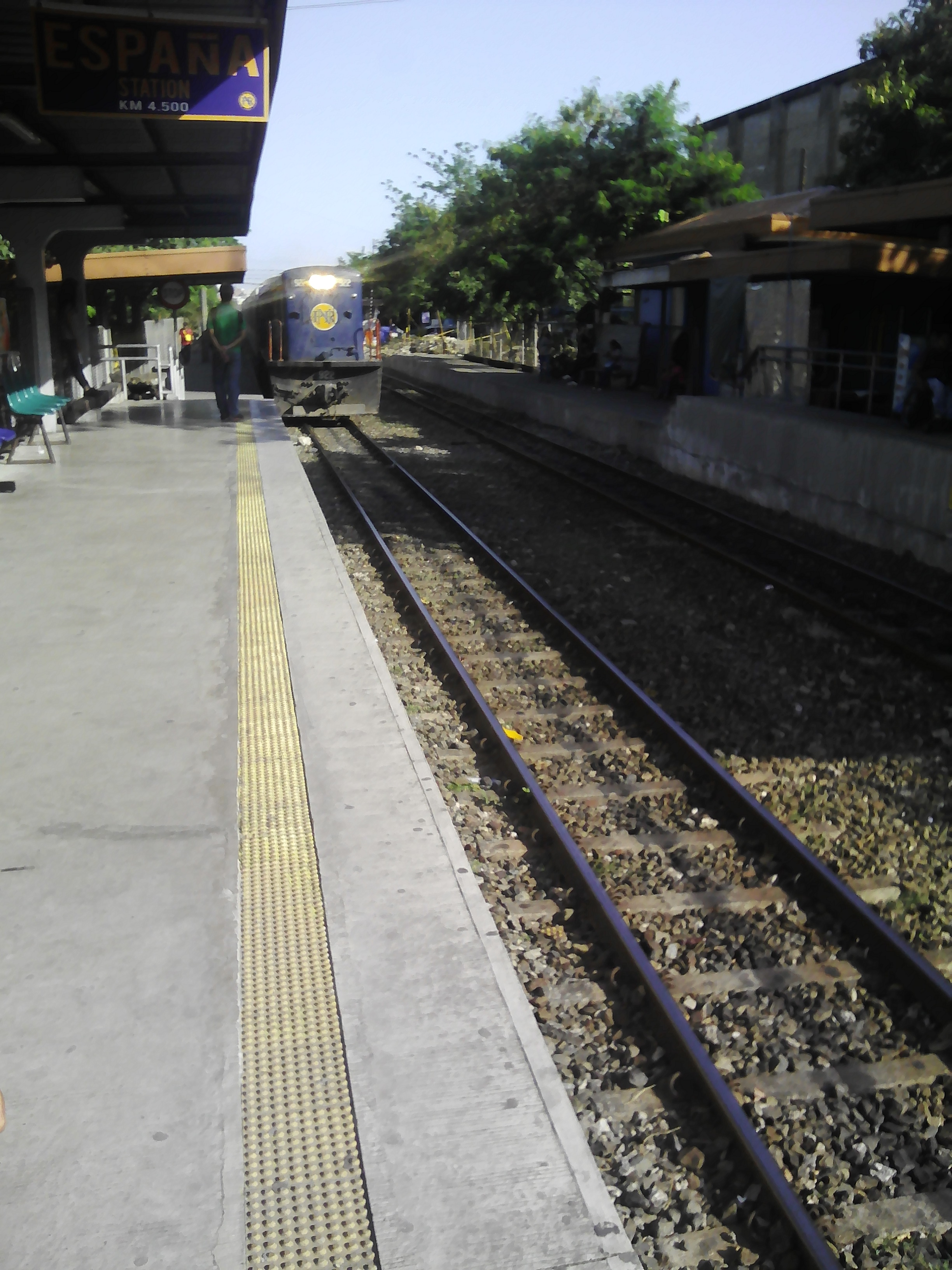
Train approaching the station (April 2016)

Major landmarks near the station include the University of Santo Tomas, Dominican School Manila, the Ramon Magsaysay High School, the Legarda Elementary School, and the España Tower.

== Transportation links ==
España station is served by buses, jeepneys, and UV Express which ply routes along España Boulevard. Cycle rickshaws also serve the vicinity around the station.

== Reconstruction ==
The station will be reconstructed as part of the PNR Calamba section of the North–South Commuter Railway. However, the station will be moved by approximately 390 meters (1,280 ft) northwest from the present station.
