= Blumentritt station (PNR) =

Southrail station in Manila

Blumentritt
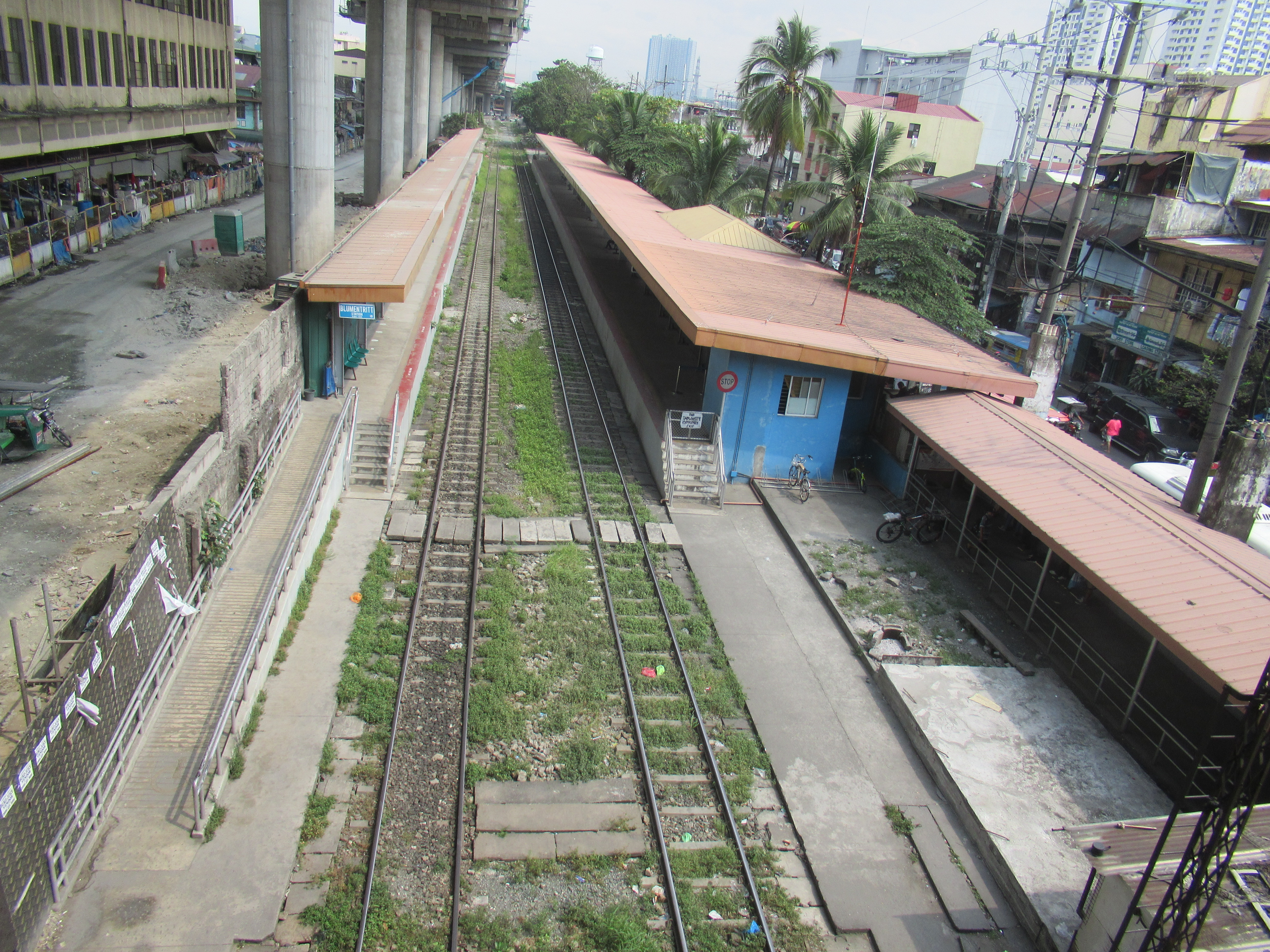
- The station in February 2023

General information
- Location: Old Antipolo Street, Santa Cruz; Manila, Metro Manila; Philippines
- Coordinates: 14°37′21.33″N 120°59′5.22″E
- Owner: Department of Transportation; Philippine National Railways
- Operator: Philippine National Railways
- Lines: South Main Line; Planned: South Commuter
- Platforms: Side platforms
- Tracks: 2
- Connections: Blumentritt, Buses, Jeepneys, Tricycles

Construction
- Accessible: yes

Other information
- Status: Closed
- Station code: BLU

History
- Opened: December 22, 1905; 120 years ago
- Closed: March 28, 2024
- Rebuilt: 1934, 1978, 1990, and 2009
- Former names: San Lazaro

Services
Preceding station	PNR	Following station
Solis towards Governor Pascual	North Shuttle	Laon Laan towards Bicutan
Tutuban Terminus	Metro South Commuter	Laon Laan towards IRRI
Tutuban Terminus	Bicol Express	España towards Legazpi
Out-of-system interchange
Preceding station	Manila LRT	Following station
Abad Santos towards Fernando Poe Jr.	LRT Line 1 transfer at Blumentritt	Tayuman towards Dr. Santos
Future services
Preceding station	PNR	Following station
Solis towards Clark International Airport	NSCR Commuter CIA–Calamba	España towards Calamba
Tutuban Terminus	NSCR Commuter Tutuban–Calamba	España towards Calamba
Caloocan towards Clark International Airport	Commuter Express CIA–Calamba	España towards Calamba
Tutuban Terminus	Commuter Express Tutuban–Calamba	España towards Calamba
Location
- Location within Manila Location within Metro Manila Location within Luzon Location within Philippines

Blumentritt station is a railway station located on the South Main Line in the city of Manila, Philippines. It is currently being repurposed as an elevated station of the under construction North–South Commuter Railway. It derives its name from nearby Blumentritt Road, which is named after the Bohemian professor Ferdinand Blumentritt, a friend of José Rizal and sympathizer of the Filipino cause.

The station is the second station southbound from Tutuban.

Blumentritt station is one of four stations whose original platforms have been retained for service. However, it is unique in the sense that the new platforms designed to accommodate new PNR diesel multiple units are not connected to the station's original platforms, unlike solutions employed at stations such as España, where the new platforms are directly connected to the original ones. The old platforms are still used to accommodate Commuter Express locomotives and especially intercity trains.

== History ==
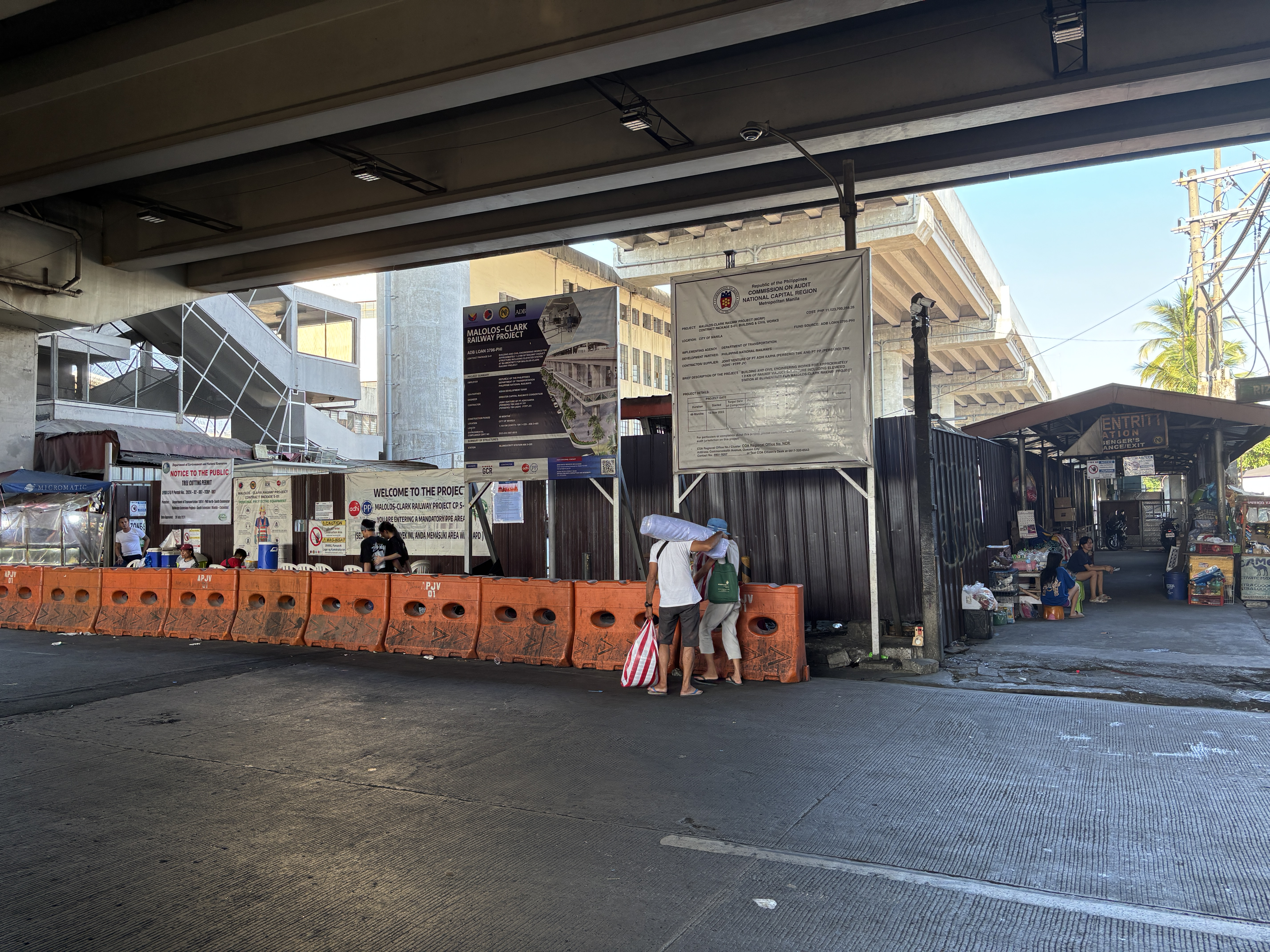
Blumentritt station closed in 2025 during the construction of the North–South Commuter Railway (Malolos–Clark Railway Project).

Blumentritt, then San Lazaro, was opened on December 22, 1905, as a station originally part of the Antipolo and Montalban lines; the Blumentritt-Santa Mesa segment of the current PNR Southrail was part of the defunct line but now it is being used for the PNR Metro South Commuter services.

On March 28, 2024, station operations were temporarily suspended to make way for the construction of the North–South Commuter Railway. The station will be repurposed as an elevated station.

== Station layout ==
L1; Platforms	Side platform, doors will open on the right
L1; Platforms	Platform A	PNR Metro Commuter towards Tutuban and Governor Pascual (←)
L1; Platforms	Platform B	PNR Metro Commuter towards Calamba (→)
L1; Platforms	Side platform, doors will open on the right
L1	Concourse/ Street Level	Ticket Booths, Station Control, Shops, LRT-1 Blumentritt station, San Roque De Manila Parish

== Transportation links ==
Blumentritt station is accessible by jeepneys and buses plying the Rizal Avenue route. Tricycles are also used to navigate around the station's immediate vicinity.

A Manila Light Rail Transit System station, also named Blumentritt, is located immediately above the station.

== Nearby landmarks ==
The station is near major landmarks such as the Blumentritt Market, SM City San Lazaro, San Lazaro Tourism and Business Park (previously the San Lazaro Hippodrome), the Chinese General Hospital and Medical Center, Manila North Cemetery, San Roque de Manila Parish Church, Mariano Ponce Elementary School, and Manuel L. Quezon High School.
