= Tayuman station (LRT) =

Train station in Manila, Philippines

Coordinates: 14°37′00.46″N 120°58′57.93″E

Tayuman
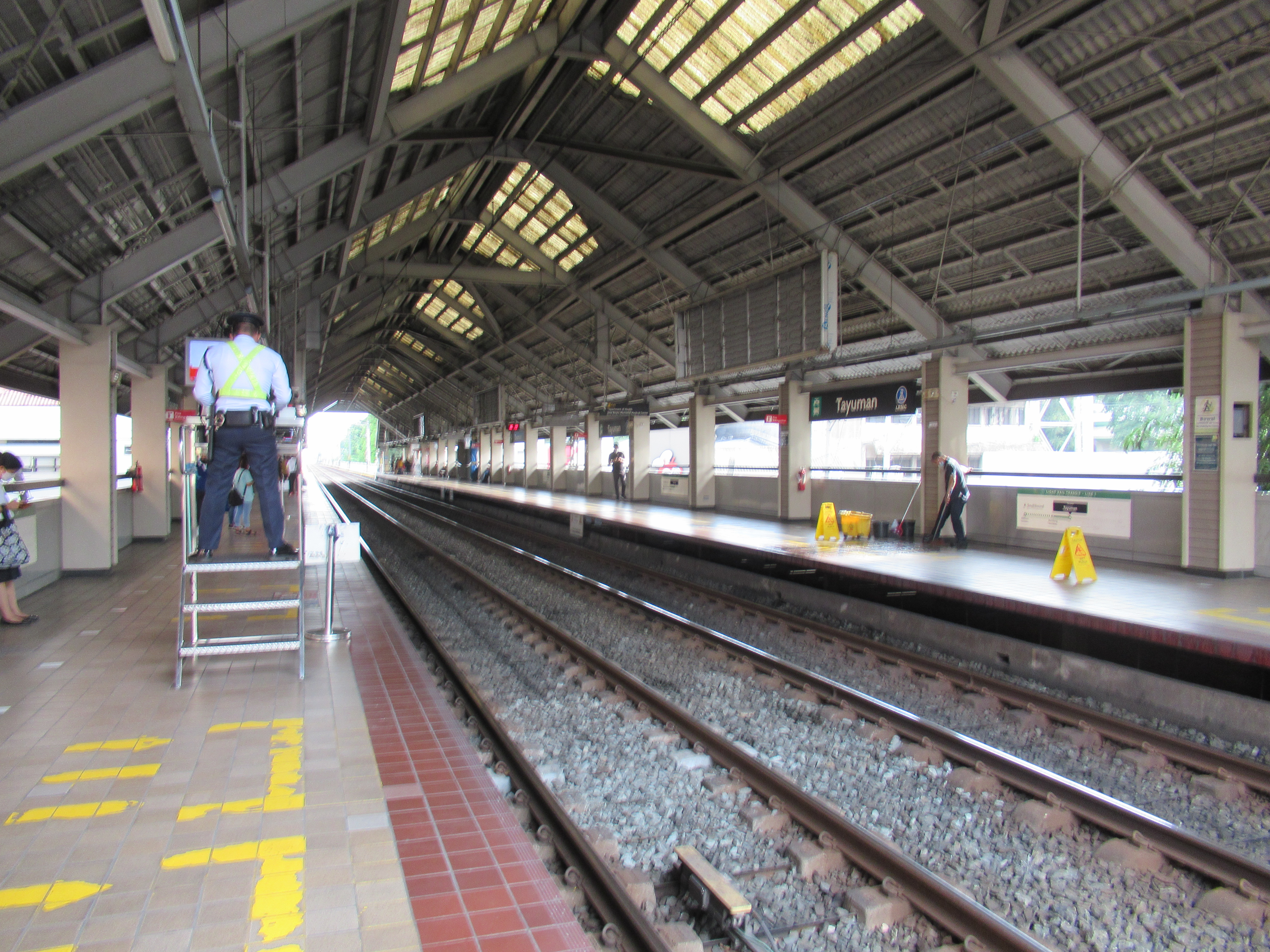

General information
- Location: 1921 Rizal Avenue, Santa Cruz; Manila, Metro Manila, Philippines
- Owner: Department of Transportation; Light Rail Manila Corporation
- Line: LRT Line 1
- Platforms: 2 (2 side)
- Tracks: 2

Construction
- Structure type: Elevated

Other information
- Station code: GL08

History
- Opened: May 12, 1985; 41 years ago

Services
Preceding station	Manila LRT	Following station
Blumentritt towards Fernando Poe Jr.	LRT Line 1	Bambang towards Dr. Santos
Track layout
Location
- Location within Manila Location within Metro Manila Location within Luzon Location within Philippines

Tayuman station is an elevated Light Rail Transit (LRT) station located on the LRT Line 1 (LRT-1) system in Manila, Philippines. The station serves Santa Cruz and is situated at the intersection of Rizal Avenue and Tayuman Street and is named after the latter.

Tayuman station serves as the eighth station for LRT-1 trains headed to Dr. Santos, the eighteenth station for trains headed to Fernando Poe Jr., and is one of the five LRT-1 stations serving Santa Cruz district, the others being Blumentritt, Bambang, Doroteo Jose, and Carriedo.

== History ==
Tayuman station was opened to the public on May 12, 1985, as part of the Rizal Line, which extended the LRT northward to Monumento.

== Transportation links ==
Like its neighbor Blumentritt, commuters can take the many jeepneys, tricycles or taxis to Tayuman station.

Because of its proximity to SM City San Lazaro, jeepneys and taxis can also take commuters to and from the station going to the mall.

== See also ==
- List of rail transit stations in Metro Manila
- Manila Light Rail Transit System
- Media related to Tayuman station at Wikimedia Commons
