= Dangwa flower market =

Fresh flower market in the Philippines

Coordinates: 14°36′55″N 120°59′19″E

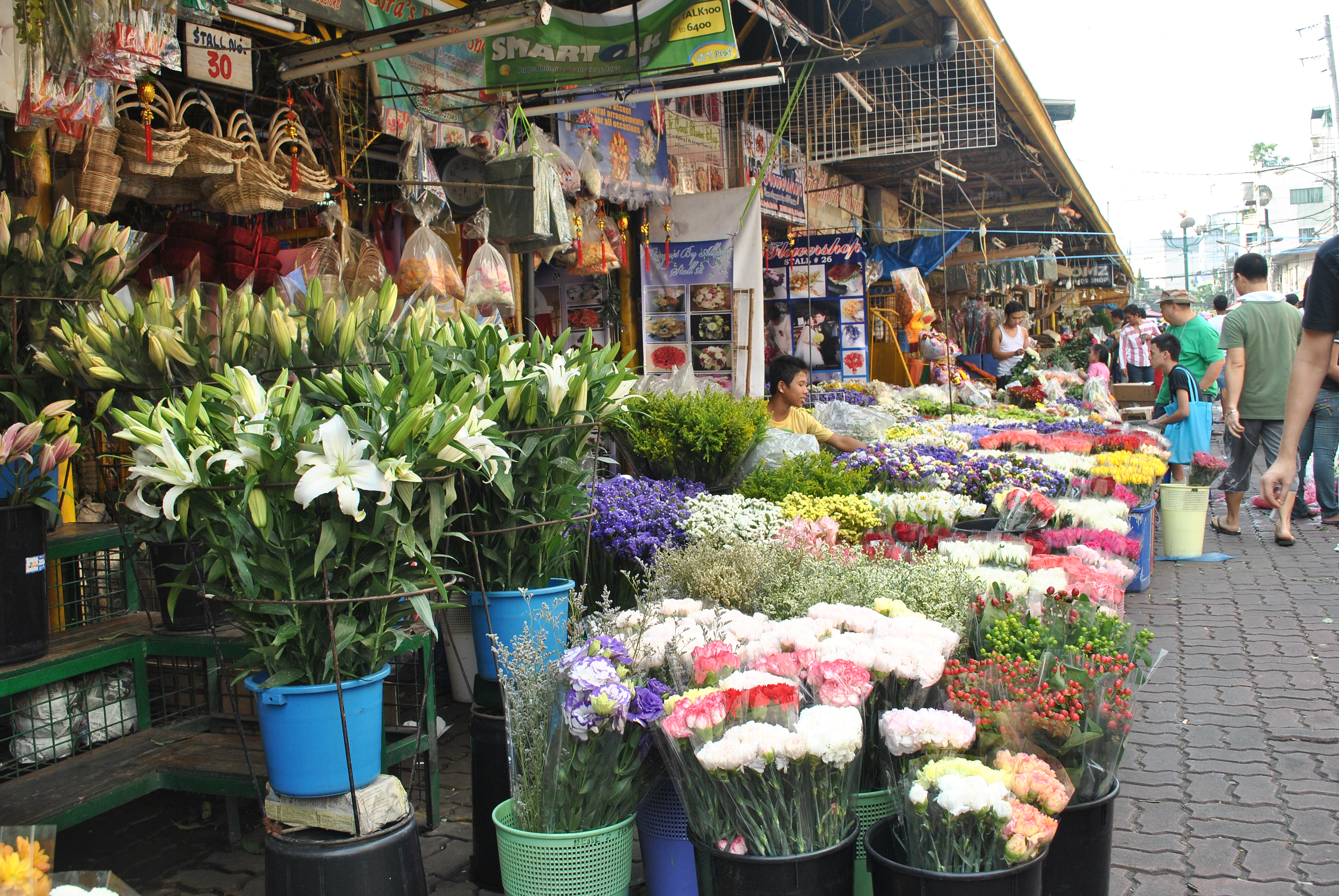
Various flowers and floral arrangements being sold at the Dangwa Flower Market

Dangwa Flower Market, also known as Dangwa or Bulaklakan ng Maynila (Flower Market of Manila), is a fresh flower market in the Sampaloc area of Manila, in the Philippines. The market is composed of small, individually-owned stalls and street vendors selling flowers wholesale and retail, at prices 50 to 90 percent cheaper than Metro Manila's flower shops. In 2004, it was home to 50 flower vendors, and most are members of the Dangwa Flower Market Association. The market is centered on the crossroads of Dos Castillas Street and Dimasalang Street, spreading to adjacent roads like Lacson Avenue and Maria Clara Street.

== Etymology ==
The market derives its name from the adjacent Dangwa Tranco Terminal. Since the late 1950s, Dangwa Tranco passenger coaches have been bringing fresh flowers from Baguio City and other parts of the Cordilleras down to Manila.

== History ==
The flower market was said to have sprouted in around 1976, when the neighbourhood was mostly middle-class residential, with a book publisher called Alip & Sons. The place grew in popularity as a flower market due to the presence of Dangwa Tranco Terminal, with buses coming from Benguet – where most cut flowers are harvested – unloading the fresh blooms in nearby streets.

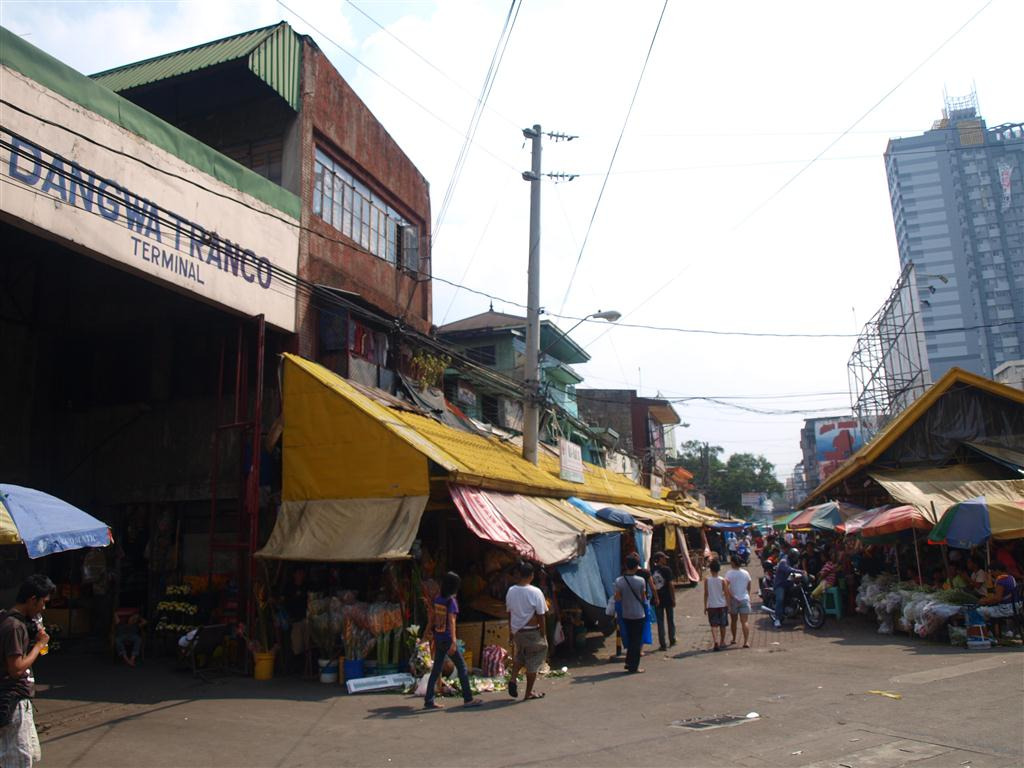
Part of the Dangwa street market and the bus terminal it was named after.

By the 1980s and the 1990s, the market had surpassed competitors in Quiapo, Manila and Baclaran. The market’s growth during the Marcos era was also due to then-First Lady Imelda Marcos and her lavish lifestyle. At that time, the market provided flowers for big flower shops, which in turn decorated Malacañang Palace.

In 1994, a hardworking business owner started operating 24 hours a day due to growing demand, and other vendors followed suit. The advent of modern technology, specifically short message service (SMS) or "texting", has tremendous impact in the industry providing improved communication with the rural farmers and efficiency in transporting flowers at lower costs. SMS has also cut losses as dealers can instantly send feedback to farmers as to which flowers are in demand in a specific season.

Flowers in the market have since originated from beyond Trinidad Valley and the Cordilleras, in other flower farms nationwide like nearby Tagaytay, Batangas, and Laguna, to Davao and Cotabato south in Mindanao. The market has also expanded to sourcing specific varieties from overseas like Thailand, the Netherlands, and Ecuador. Some common varieties available include mums, roses, orchids, ylang-ylang, gerberas, anthuriums, and asters.

== Peak season ==
The flower market's peak seasons are around Valentine's Day, graduation days, Holy Week, Mother's Day, All Saints Day and December. Sometimes customers flock the market till 11 pm on Valentine's Day.
