= Ferdinand Blumentritt =

Austrian writer and ethnographer

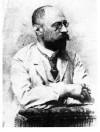
- Portrait by Frank Laubach c. 1909
- Born: Ferdinand Johann Franz Blumentritt; 10 September 1853; Prague, Bohemia, Austrian Empire
- Died: 20 September 1913 (aged 60); Litoměřice, Bohemia, Austria-Hungary
- Occupations: Author, secondary school teacher and director, ethnography
- Children: 3
- Parent(s): Ferdinand Matthaeus Johann Blumentritt; Amalia Ecatherina Schneider
- Writing career
- Language: German, English, Czech

Ferdinand Johann Franz Blumentritt (10 September 1853 – 20 September 1913) was an Austrian teacher, secondary school principal and lecturer. He was author of articles and books about the Philippines and its ethnography. He is well known in the Philippines for his close friendship with the writer and Propagandist José Rizal, and the numerous correspondence between the two provide a vital reference for historians and scholars studying Rizal, including his last letter from prison before the execution.

== Biography ==
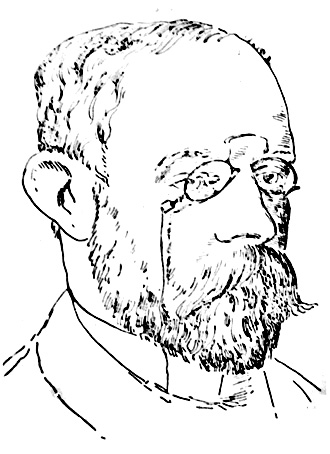
José Rizal's pencil sketch of Blumentritt as it appears in the book Life and Writings of José Rizal

Blumentritt was born in Prague in the Kingdom of Bohemia in the Austrian Empire (now the Czech Republic).

Blumentritt wrote extensively about the Philippines, although he never visited the islands, corresponding with the then Filipino student and writer José Rizal, who later became a national hero. Blumentritt's relationship with Rizal began as early as July 1886. Blumentritt became one of Rizal's closest confidants, although they met only once. He translated a chapter of the latter's first book, Noli Me Tangere, into German and wrote the preface to Rizal's second book, El filibusterismo, although he was against its publication as he believed that it would lead to Rizal's death. These two novels are commentaries disguised as fiction which angered both the Catholic Church and the Spanish colonial government, and which eventually led to Rizal's 1896 trial and execution. Before the execution in Manila, Rizal wrote his final letter for Blumentritt. Blumentritt reportedly cried after having received the letter.

Alongside Rizal, Blumentritt was a significant contributor to the publication La Solidaridad, published by Filipino expatriates from 1889 to 1895 as a voice for advocacy of political reforms in the Philippines. From 1900, Blumentritt was a member of the Berlin Society for Anthropology.

Blumentritt died in Litoměřice, Bohemia. He is memorialized in the Philippines by numerous public parks and streets. Among them are Blumentritt Road, Blumentritt LRT Station, Blumentritt PNR Station, the Blumentritt Market in Metro Manila and the Blumentritt Street in Naga City and Tuguegarao. His relations with Rizal also caused the twin status of the Czech town of Litoměřice with the Philippine towns of Calamba (Rizal's birthplace) and Dapitan (where Rizal was initially exiled).

== Main works ==
- Alphabetisches Register der Reifeprüfungsvorschriften. Litoměřice, 1909
- Alphabetisches Verzeichnis der gebräuchlichsten Aquarellfarben. Litoměřice, 1910
- America and the Philippines (1900)
- Die Chinesen auf den Philippinen. Litoměřice, 1879
- Diccionario mitologico de Filipinas. Madrid, 1895
- Einige Manuskripte aus dem 17. und 18. Jahrhundert. Litoměřice, 1904
- Einiges über Juan Valera. Litoměřice, 1894
- Introduction to the Noli me tangere of Rizal. Barcelona, 1889
- Introduction to the Sucesos de las islas Filipinas of Antonio de Morga, annotated by Rizal. Paris, 1890
- Die Erdbeben des Juli 1880 auf den Philippinen
- Die Goldfundstellen auf den Philippinen und ihre Ausbeutung
- Holländische Angriffe auf die Philippinen im 16., 17., und 18. Jahrhundert. Litoměřice, 1880
- Das Kaiserbild. Litoměřice, 1899
- J. C. Labhart-Lutz. Ein Nachruf. Litoměřice, 1889
- Die Philippinen. Eine übersichtliche Darstellung der ethnographischen und historischpolitischen Verhältnisse des Archipels. Hamburg, 1900
- Die Sprachgebiete Europas am Ausgange des Mittelalters, verglichen mit den Zuständen der Gegenwart. Prague (Czech: Praha), 1883
- Strömungen und Gezeiten an der Küste von Mindanao.
- Der "Tratado Anonimo" über den Aufstand der Cumuneros gegen König Carl V. Litoměřice, 1878
- Versuch einer Ethnographie der Philippinen.[=Towards an ethnography of the Philippines] Gotha, 1882. Translated from the German into English by Marcelino N. Maceda.
- Vocabular einzelner Ausdrücke und Redensarten, welche dem Spanischen der philippinischen Inseln eigenthümlich sind. Litoměřice, 1882, 1883–1884|8, 1885|5.
