= Sampaloc, Manila =

District of Metro Manila, Philippines

Sampaloc
- District of Manila
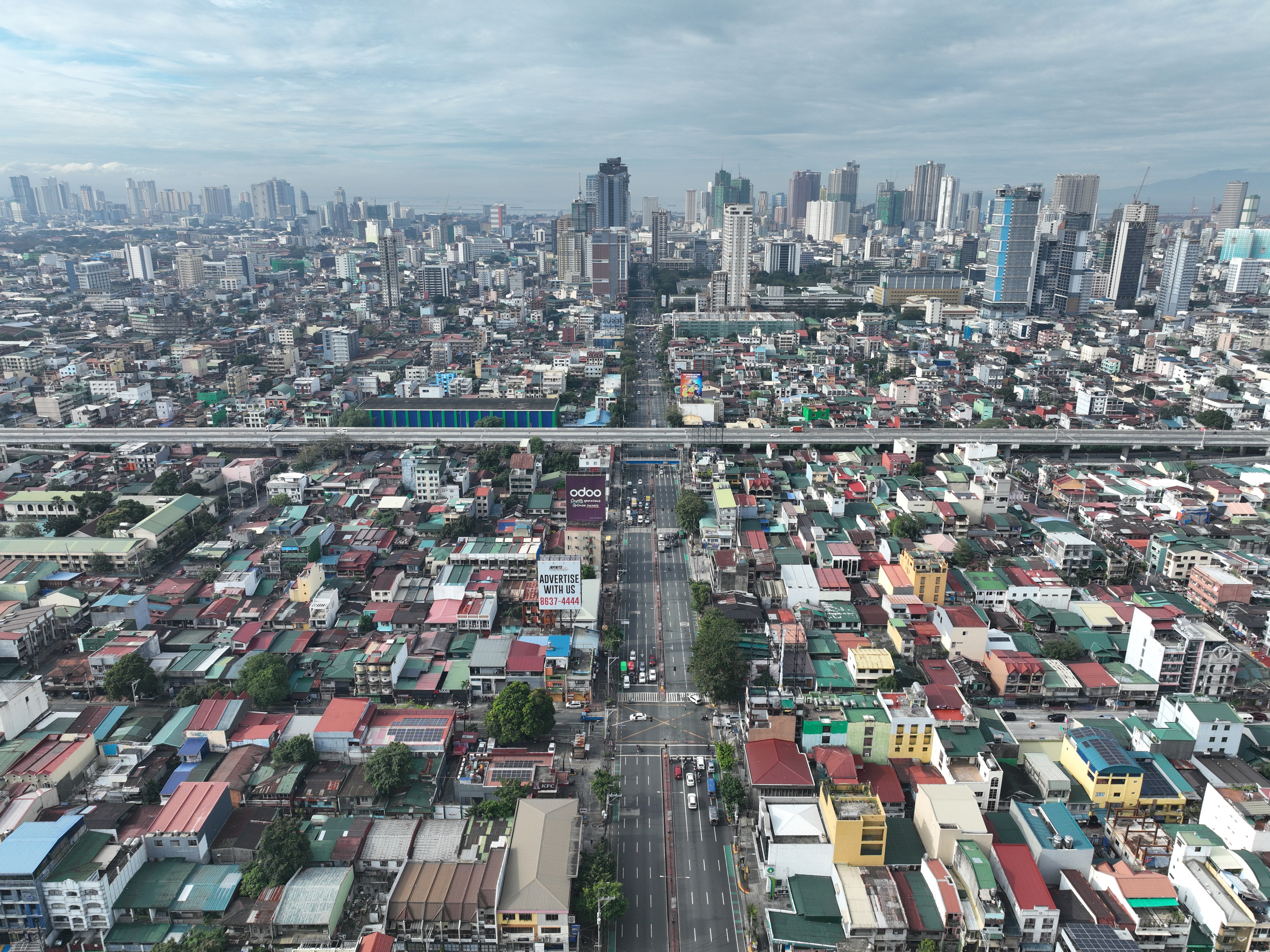
- Drone shot of Sampaloc
- Nickname: University Belt
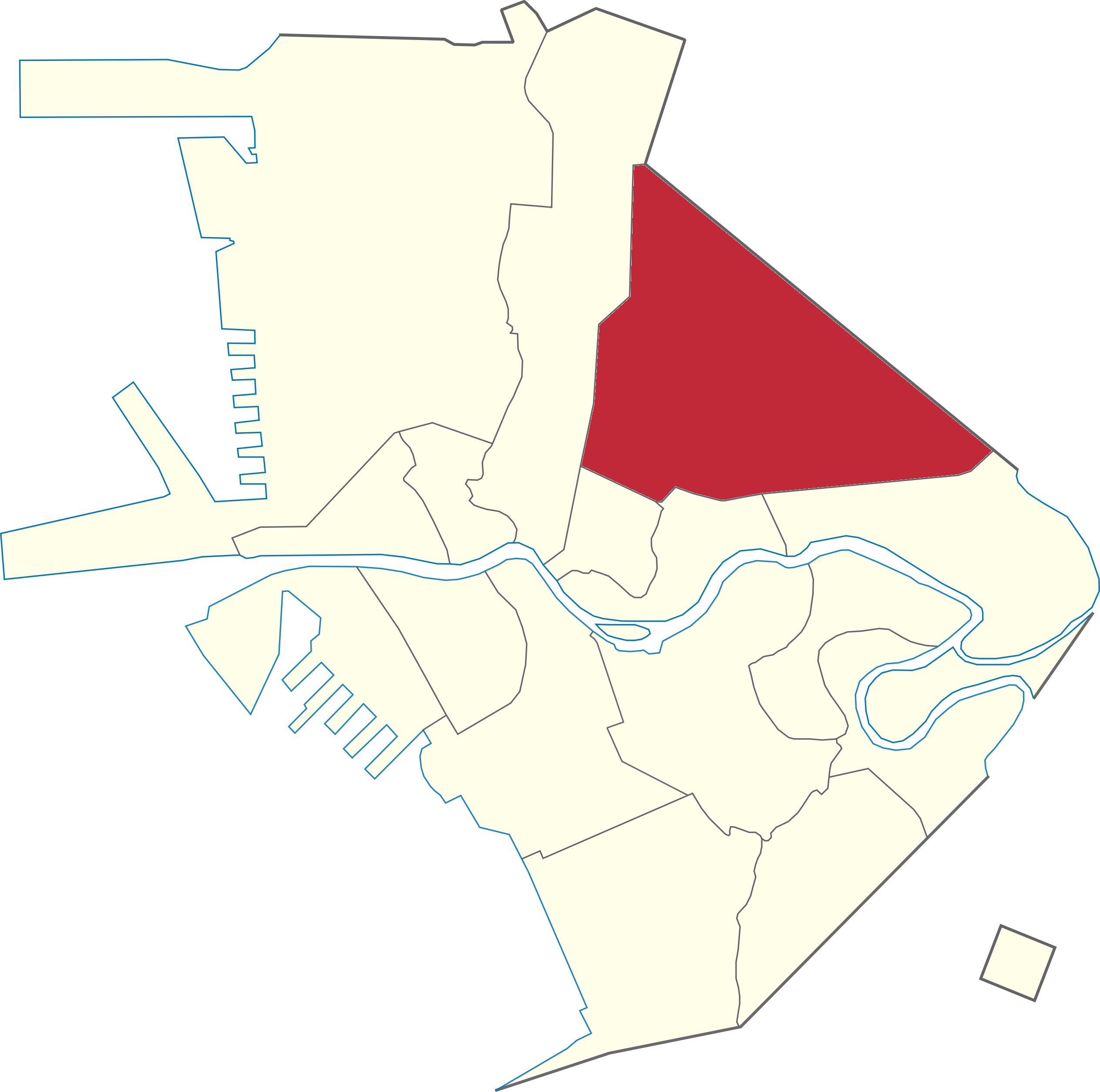
- Coordinates: 14°36′11″N 121°00′08″E
- Country: Philippines
- Region: National Capital Region
- City: Manila
- Congressional District: 4th District of Manila
- Barangays: 192

Area
  - Total: 5.1371 km^{2} (1.9834 sq mi)

Population (2024)
  - Total: 398,396
  - Density: 51,386/km^{2} (133,090/sq mi)
- Time zone: UTC+08:00 (Philippine Standard Time)
- ZIP Code: 1015 (Sampaloc West); 1008 (Sampaloc East)
- Area codes: 02

Sampaloc is a district of Manila, Philippines. It is referred to as the University Belt or simply called "U-Belt" for numerous colleges and universities are found within the district such as the University of Santo Tomas, the oldest extant university in Asia; the National University, the first private nonsectarian and coeducational institution in the Philippines; the Far Eastern University, known for its Art Deco campus and cultural heritage site of the Philippines; and the University of the East, once dubbed as the largest university in Asia in terms of enrollment. The district is bordered by the districts of Quiapo and San Miguel in the south, Santa Mesa district in the south and east, Santa Cruz district in the west and north, and Quezon City in the northeast.

Aside from being the "University Belt", Sampaloc is also known to Metro Manila and the surrounding provinces for its Dangwa flower market, located in Dimasalang Road, well known as the selling center for cut flowers from all over the Philippines, mainly Baguio. Sampaloc is also the location of a former colonial mansion, now called Windsor Inn, which is popular among backpackers and budget travelers.

Barangays 395 to 636 of the City of Manila would all have belonged to Sampaloc and comprise 241 barangays for the district. However, what are now known as barangays 587-636 became part of Santa Mesa when these areas were separated from Sampaloc after Santa Mesa became a separate parish in 1911. Santa Mesa is now a part of the 6th congressional district of Manila, while Sampaloc is the sole district comprising the 4th congressional district of Manila.

Many streets in Sampaloc, particularly in the northeast portion divided by España and Lacson Avenues and also street names in neighboring Quezon City, have names that are directly associated with the Philippine national hero José Rizal, either named after the places (e.g. Calamba, Dapitan), real-life people (e.g. Blumentritt), characters from his novels (e.g. Ibarra, Maria Clara) or his pen names (e.g. Laong Laan, Dimasalang).

It is also known as the birthplace of Benigno Aquino III, the 15th President of the Philippines.

== Etymology ==
"Sampaloc" or "Sampalok" is the native Tagalog word for the tamarind fruit; the place was likely named after tamarind trees that may have been prevalent in the area.

== History ==
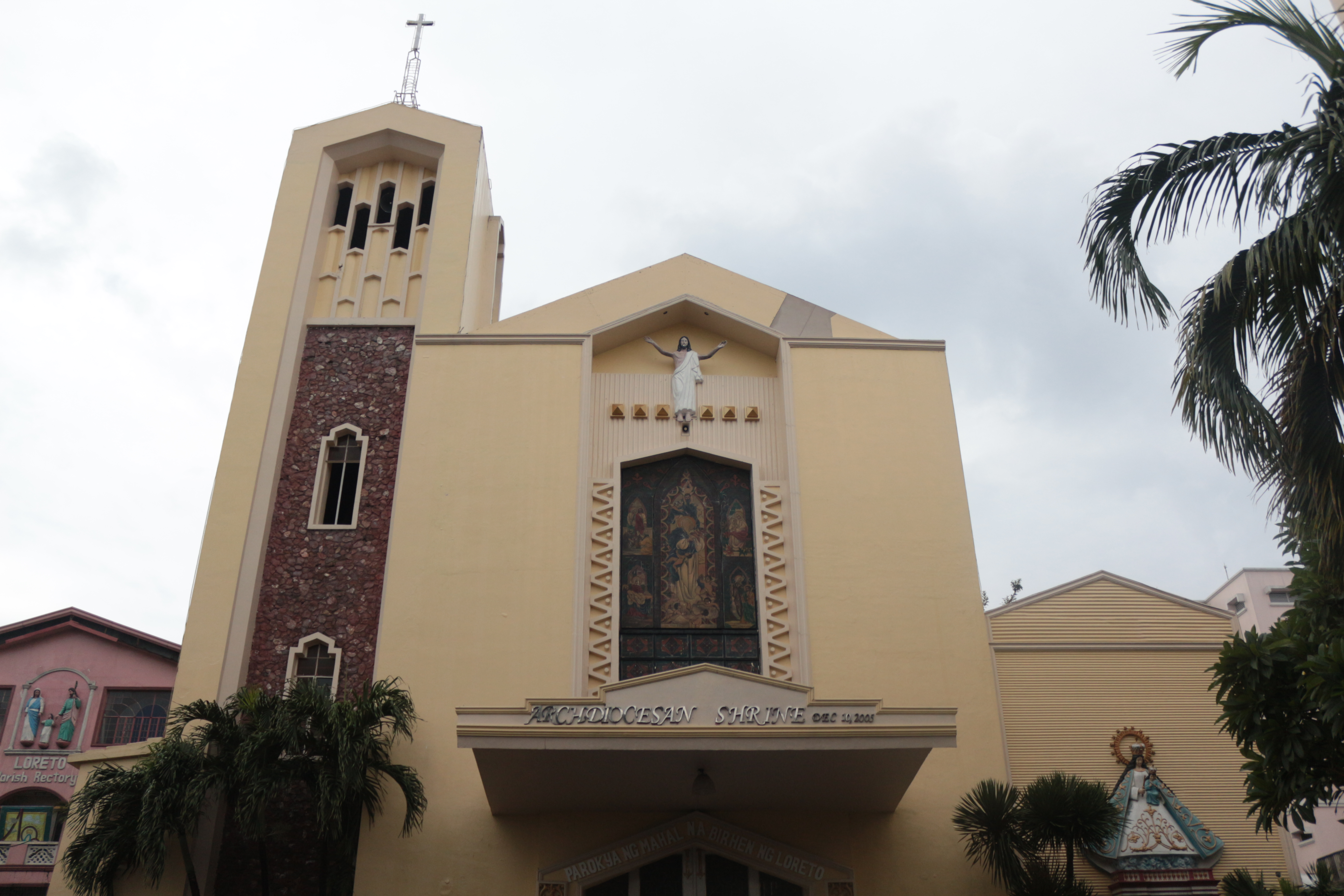
National Shrine of Our Lady of Loreto

The founding of Sampaloc as a town coincided with its establishment as a parish independent of Santa Ana de Sapa in 1613. At the time, it included what is now Pandacan which was separated from it in 1712. Sampaloc would comprise ten barangays ― Bacood, Balic-Balic, Bilarang Hipon, Calubcub, Manggahan, Nagtahan, San Isidro, San Roque, Santa Mesa, and Santol.

=== Outbreak of the Philippine-American War ===
Following the Philippine Revolution against Spain and the Treaty of Paris of 1898 which seceded the Philippines to the United States, the subsequent arrival of American colonial troops shortly drew animosity between both American troops and Filipino troops.

On the evening of February 4, 1899, Private William W. Grayson fired the first shot of the Philippine-American War at the corner of Sociego Street and Tomas Arguelles Street. A study done by Ronnie Miravite Casalmir places the event at this corner, not at Sociego-Silencio where they erroneously have the marker. The Ronnie Miravite Casalmir Study debunks the previous findings of Dr. Benito Legarda which was the basis for the erroneous placement of the marker at Sociego-Silencio. According to Ronnie Miravite Casalmir, the smoking gun for the Sociego-Arguelles corner is the presence of Blockhouse 7 in the background of Grayson's reenactment photo. The orientation of this Blockhouse 7 image lines up with the corner of Sociego and Arguelles when compared with the known photo of Blockhouse 7 taken from the same direction. In addition, the distance estimate of Lieut. Whedon placed the 100-yard distance from Santol at Sociego-Arguelles, not Sociego-Silencio. This meant that when Lieut. Whedon ordered the detachment at Santol to patrol 100 yards, he meant them to patrol all the way to Sociego-Arguelles. Col. Stotsenburg corroborated Lieut. Whedon's distance estimate. Prof. Ambeth R. Ocampo calls the evidence presented by Ronnie Miravite Casalmir as new and compelling. Prof. Ocampo agrees that this evidence shows that the marker should be moved one block away, from Sociego-Silencio to Sociego-Arguelles. Maj. Lillian A. Pfluke (Ret.), West Point Class of 1980, and founder of the American War Memorials Overseas Inc. also agrees and has a note on their U.S. War Memorials website that the proper placement of the marker should be at the adjoining intersection of Sociego Street and Arguelles Street where the incident actually occurred.

=== American colonial era ===
In 1901, with the chartering of the city of Manila under the American-led Taft Commission, where most of Sampaloc, with the exception of barangay Bilarang Hipon, would be absorbed by the city of Manila when its borders were extended outside the walled city now known as Intramuros. The latter barangay would be incorporated into San Francisco del Monte town and later on Quezon City, being divided later into several villages itself under what is now its 4th district.

In 1911, Santa Mesa became a separate religious district (parish) out of Sampaloc when the first and oldest parish in the Philippines in honor of its Titular Patron, the Sacred Heart of Jesus, was established. However, it remained politically part of Sampaloc.

=== Contemporary period ===
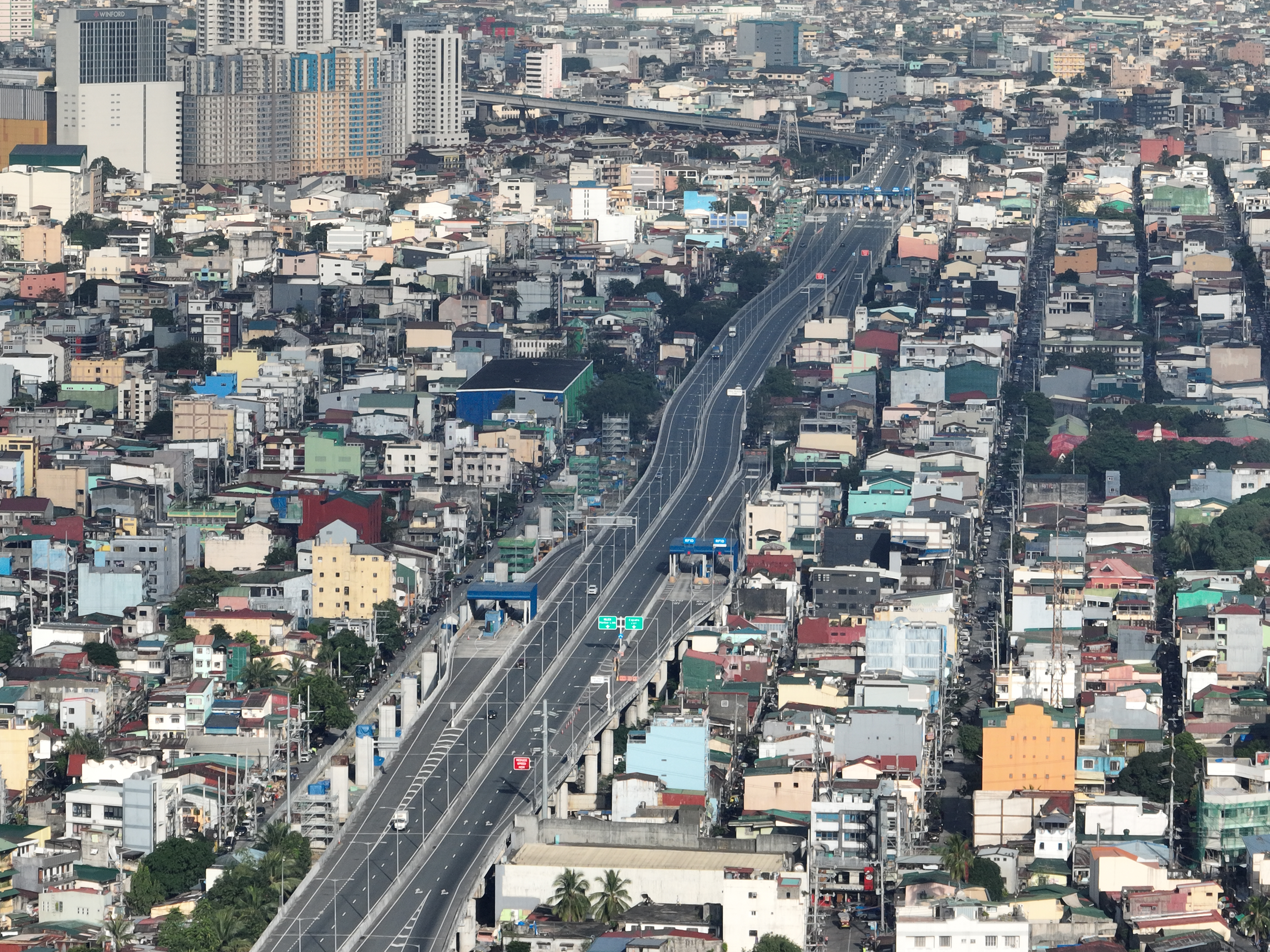
Drone shot of Sampaloc with NLEX Connector

In 1996, Ramon Bagatsing Jr., the then-representative of Manila's 4th district, launched a program called the "Sampaloc Experiment", which sought to implement the then-new subject of computer education within the district's public schools as a trial program for the rest of the country.

In the afternoon of April 28, 2025, chairman Leninsky Bacud of the Ang Bumbero ng Pilipinas partylist (ABP, lit. 'The Firemen of the Philippines') was assassinated by two motorcycle-riding gunmen while he was standing just outside the covered gym of Barangay 435, of which Bacud was a former barangay captain. Even after Bacud was shot, witnesses recounted that the backrider stepped off the motorcycle and continued firing multiple shots at Bacud on the ground even as he was pleading for his life. Bacud had been running as the partylist's second nominee in the 2025 elections at the time of the shooting.

== Barangays ==
Zone	Barangay
Zone 41	Barangays 395, 396, 397, 398, 399, 400, 401, 402, 403, and 404
Zone 42	Barangays 405, 406, 407, 408, 409, 410, 411, 412, 413, 414, 415, and 416
Zone 43	Barangays 417, 418, 419, 420, 421, 422, 423, 424, 425, 426, 427, and 428
Zone 44	Barangays 429, 430, 431, 432, 433, 434, 435, 436, 437, 438, 439, 440, 441, 442, 443, 444, 445, 446, 447, 448, and 449
Zone 45	Barangays 450, 451, 452, 453, 454, 455, 456, 457, 458, 459, 460, and 461
Zone 46	Barangays 462, 463, 464, 465, 466, 467, 468, 469, 470, and 471
Zone 47	Barangays 472, 473, 474, 475, 476, 477, 478, 479, 480, and 481
Zone 48	Barangays 482, 483, 484, 485, 486, 487, 488, 489, 490, and 491
Zone 49	Barangays 492, 493, 494, 495, 496, 497, 498, 499, 500, and 501
Zone 50	Barangays 502, 503, 504, 505, 506, 507, 508, 509, 510, and 511
Zone 51	Barangays 512, 513, 514, 515, 516, 517, 518, 519, and 520
Zone 52	Barangays 521, 522, 523, 524, 525, 526, 527, 528, 529, 530, and 531
Zone 53	Barangays 532, 533, 534, 535, 536, 537, 538, 539, 540, and 541
Zone 54	Barangays 542, 543, 544, 545, 546, 547, 548, 549, 550, 551, 552, 553, and 554
Zone 55	Barangays 555, 556, 557, 558, 559, 560, 561, 562, 563, 564, 565, 566, 567, and 568
Zone 56	Barangays 569, 570, 571, 572, 573, 574, 575, 576, 577, 578, 579, and 580
Zone 57	Barangays 581, 582, 583, 584, 585, and 586

Barangay	Land area (km²)	Population (2020)
Zone 41
Barangay 395	0.09723 km²	1,222
Barangay 396	0.04508 km²	1,666
Barangay 397	0.04119 km²	4,175
Barangay 398	0.02018 km²	3,068
Barangay 399	0.01569 km²	1,068
Barangay 400	0.02140 km²	1,504
Barangay 401	0.03689 km²	2,333
Barangay 402	0.02951 km²	2,758
Barangay 403	0.02284 km²	630
Barangay 404	0.07061 km²	723
Zone 42
Barangay 405	0.01624 km²	999
Barangay 406	0.009580 km²	449
Barangay 407	0.02898 km²	1,571
Barangay 408	0.02461 km²	1,768
Barangay 409	0.02941 km²	1,921
Barangay 410	0.04383 km²	2,424
Barangay 411	0.03153 km²	1,903
Barangay 412	0.03461 km²	1,890
Barangay 413	0.01720 km²	1,702
Barangay 414	0.01629 km²	1,716
Barangay 415	0.02361 km²	884
Barangay 416	0.02850 km²	821
Zone 43
Barangay 417	0.02397 km²	2,011
Barangay 418	0.03716 km²	2,835
Barangay 419	0.02194 km²	1,696
Barangay 420	0.03817 km²	3,134
Barangay 421	0.02966 km²	1,474
Barangay 422	0.02801 km²	2,304
Barangay 423	0.02861 km²	1,307
Barangay 424	0.03314 km²	1,900
Barangay 425	0.04870 km²	2,087
Barangay 426	0.03129 km²	1,786
Barangay 427	0.01922 km²	495
Barangay 428	0.02854 km²	1,304
Zone 44
Barangay 429	0.02294 km²	2,814
Barangay 430	0.01251 km²	508
Barangay 431	0.01430 km²	700
Barangay 432	0.05614 km²	3,436
Barangay 433	0.01235 km²	464
Barangay 434	0.02024 km²	1,173
Barangay 435	0.02564 km²	592
Barangay 436	0.02085 km²	964
Barangay 437	0.01779 km²	899
Barangay 438	0.01268 km²	712
Barangay 439	0.01790 km²	1,052
Barangay 440	0.01247 km²	1,004
Barangay 441	0.01277 km²	856
Barangay 442	0.01626 km²	670
Barangay 443	0.01608 km²	1,382
Barangay 444	0.01617 km²	941
Barangay 445	0.01278 km²	931
Barangay 446	0.01410 km²	1,002
Barangay 447	0.01303 km²	1,454
Barangay 448	0.01834 km²	1,375
Barangay 449	0.01657 km²	1,402
Zone 45
Barangay 450	0.03379 km²	1,835
Barangay 451	0.01954 km²	1,027
Barangay 452	0.02150 km²	1,039
Barangay 453	0.02001 km²	1,492
Barangay 454	0.01979 km²	1,153
Barangay 455	0.01870 km²	1,274
Barangay 456	0.02463 km²	1,530
Barangay 457	0.02456 km²	2,445
Barangay 458	0.03408 km²	1,462
Barangay 459	0.02050 km²	752
Barangay 460	0.03406 km²	789
Barangay 461	0.02214 km²	863
Zone 46
Barangay 462	0.02454 km²	1,528
Barangay 463	0.01329 km²	830
Barangay 464	0.02409 km²	2,954
Barangay 465	0.01296 km²	762
Barangay 466	0.01875 km²	1,237
Barangay 467	0.01241 km²	1,160
Barangay 468	0.01338 km²	1,300
Barangay 469	0.01414 km²	1,956
Barangay 470	0.2734 km²	2,260
Barangay 471	0.03693 km²	1,415
Zone 47
Barangay 472	0.01641 km²	1,122
Barangay 473	0.01745 km²	1,383
Barangay 474	0.02527 km²	1,655
Barangay 475	0.02593 km²	1,664
Barangay 476	0.03335 km²	1,268
Barangay 477	0.02281 km²	1,045
Barangay 478	0.02578 km²	1,129
Barangay 479	0.05030 km²	2,307
Barangay 480	0.01571 km²	810
Barangay 481	0.01875 km²	1,004
Zone 48
Barangay 482	0.01636 km²	701
Barangay 483	0.02301 km²	1,369
Barangay 484	0.01718 km²	1,777
Barangay 485	0.02250 km²	1,337
Barangay 486	0.01926 km²	969
Barangay 487	0.02273 km²	1,457
Barangay 488	0.02223 km²	783
Barangay 489	0.02261 km²	1,142
Barangay 490	0.02184 km²	471
Barangay 491	0.02193 km²	813
Zone 49
Barangay 492	0.03018 km²	1,107
Barangay 493	0.01972 km²	1,170
Barangay 494	0.04377 km²	2,318
Barangay 495	0.03750 km²	1,906
Barangay 496	0.02539 km²	1,177
Barangay 497	0.03781 km²	1,489
Barangay 498	0.02180 km²	1,033
Barangay 499	0.02142 km²	1,498
Barangay 500	0.04006 km²	2,562
Barangay 501	0.01886 km²	845
Zone 50
Barangay 502	0.01747 km²	815
Barangay 503	0.02621 km²	1,183
Barangay 504	0.02197 km²	1,312
Barangay 505	0.01845 km²	1,200
Barangay 506	0.01616 km²	668
Barangay 507	0.02460 km²	1,532
Barangay 508	0.01885 km²	1,006
Barangay 509	0.02192 km²	1,260
Barangay 510	0.01861 km²	1,134
Barangay 511	0.02167 km²	1,338
Zone 51
Barangay 512	0.05525 km²	2,473
Barangay 513	0.03467 km²	2,033
Barangay 514	0.03409 km²	2,283
Barangay 515	0.04291 km²	2,166
Barangay 516	0.01712 km²	1,087
Barangay 517	0.02402 km²	1,029
Barangay 518	0.03464 km²	1,908
Barangay 519	0.02183 km²	1,311
Barangay 520	0.03736 km²	631
Zone 52
Barangay 521	0.04435 km²	2,244
Barangay 522	0.01998 km²	1,091
Barangay 523	0.02492 km²	1,115
Barangay 524	0.02492 km²	865
Barangay 525	0.02641 km²	1,784
Barangay 526	0.01271 km²	790
Barangay 527	0.02057 km²	2,134
Barangay 528	0.02266 km²	1,433
Barangay 529	0.01523 km²	935
Barangay 530	0.02514 km²	483
Barangay 531	0.02490 km²	956
Zone 53
Barangay 532	0.01374 km²	987
Barangay 533	0.01261 km²	913
Barangay 534	0.01747 km²	1,096
Barangay 535	0.01312 km²	1,035
Barangay 536	0.01564 km²	944
Barangay 537	0.01673 km²	1,085
Barangay 538	0.01225 km²	821
Barangay 539	0.05418 km²	1,846
Barangay 540	0.02218 km²	1,951
Barangay 541	0.01377 km²	485
Zone 54
Barangay 542	0.01216 km²	802
Barangay 543	0.01214 km²	822
Barangay 544	0.01355 km²	164
Barangay 545	0.01082 km²	883
Barangay 546	0.01594 km²	892
Barangay 547	0.02791 km²	1,059
Barangay 548	0.01452 km²	749
Barangay 549	0.01393 km²	867
Barangay 550	0.01212 km²	992
Barangay 551	0.01229 km²	959
Barangay 552	0.01688 km²	937
Barangay 553	0.01052 km²	1,430
Barangay 554	0.02777 km²	1,551
Zone 55
Barangay 555	0.01732 km²	1,138
Barangay 556	0.01369 km²	822
Barangay 557	0.01225 km²	1,262
Barangay 558	0.01413 km²	1,260
Barangay 559	0.01413 km²	1,285
Barangay 560	0.01518 km²	1,103
Barangay 561	0.02157 km²	2,332
Barangay 562	0.02165 km²	2,583
Barangay 563	0.01348 km²	1,526
Barangay 564	0.01610 km²	1,430
Barangay 565	0.03230 km²	2,464
Barangay 566	0.02844 km²	2,160
Barangay 567	0.03523 km²	2,318
Barangay 568	0.02096 km²	1,847
Zone 56
Barangay 569	0.02068 km²	2,086
Barangay 570	0.03865 km²	2,002
Barangay 571	0.02203 km²	2,097
Barangay 572	0.01535 km²	1,856
Barangay 573	0.01571 km²	947
Barangay 574	0.01740 km²	1,479
Barangay 575	0.01489 km²	1,007
Barangay 576	0.03671 km²	3,603
Barangay 577	0.01196 km²	985
Barangay 578	0.02529 km²	1,100
Barangay 579	0.03000 km²	1,703
Barangay 580	0.02271 km²	2,008
Zone 57
Barangay 581	0.1806 km²	2,461
Barangay 582	0.01337 km²	1,563
Barangay 583	0.01091 km²	1,278
Barangay 584	0.1003 km²	3,411
Barangay 585	0.06817 km²	1,090
Barangay 586	0.1102 km²	5,105

== Education ==
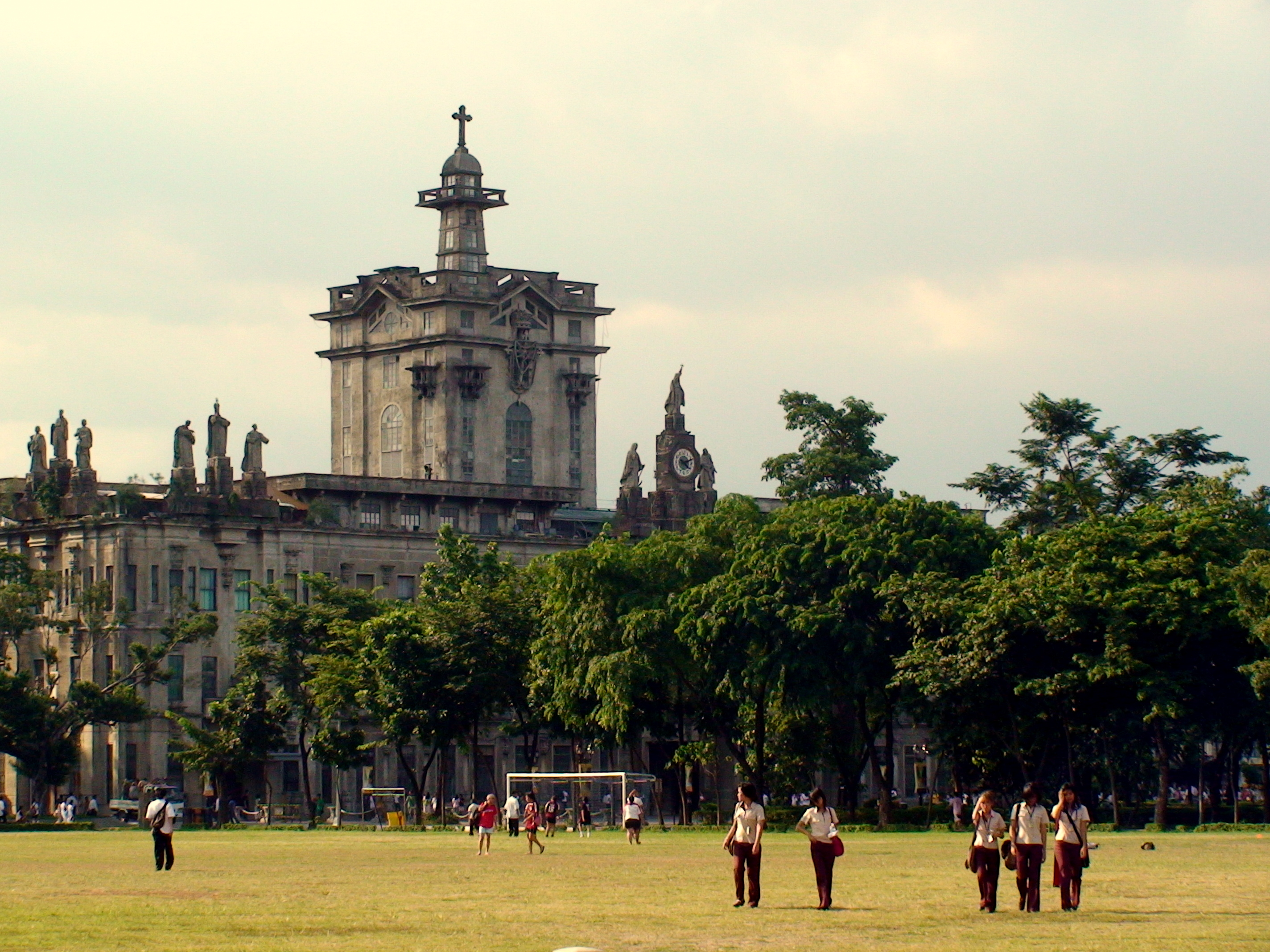
University of Santo Tomas Main Building

Education in Sampaloc is handled by the Division of City Schools – Manila. Sampaloc is also home to some universities and colleges part of the University Belt such as Far Eastern University, Informatics, Mary Chiles College, National University, Perpetual Help College of Manila, Philippine College of Health Sciences, Philippine School of Business Administration, University of the East, University of Manila, and University of Santo Tomas.

Sampaloc elementary-public education's Dr. Alejandro Mayoralgo Albert Elementary School along Dapitan Street, Barangay 521, Sampaloc, named after the first Filipino Undersecretary of Public Instruction (b. September 1, 1896) opened on April 8, 2024. The 10-story DDAES has 234 air-conditioned classrooms, a 334 seating capacity gymnasium, 72 comfort rooms, 28 offices, 10 elevators, library, roofdeck, outdoor basketball courts, football field and 364-seat capacity auditorium on the eighth floor.

== Transportation ==
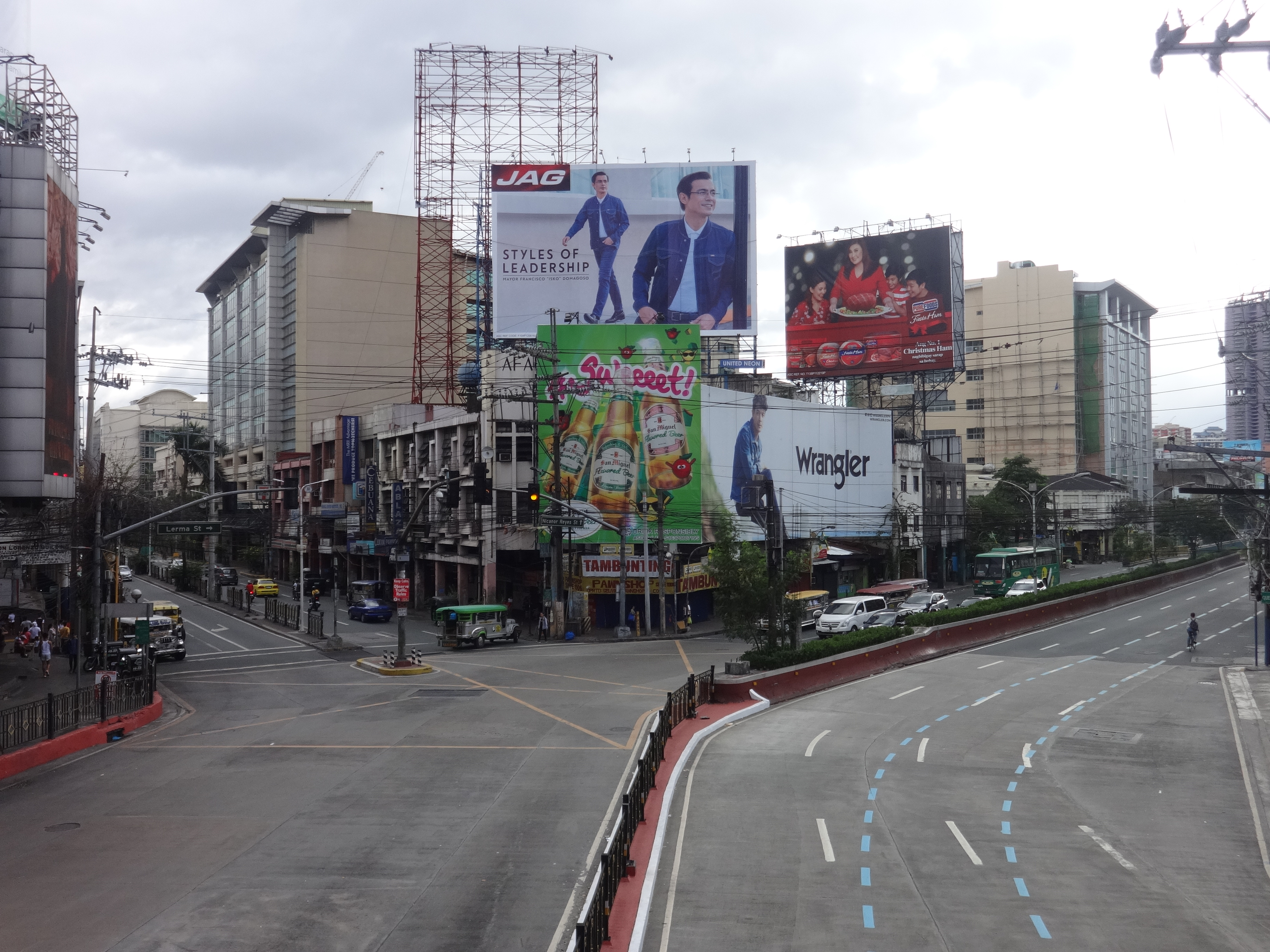
Intersection of España Boulevard, Morayta Street, and Lerma Street

Sampaloc is the hub of major national bus transportation carriers. Among the bus companies in Sampaloc with their terminal are: Fariñas Transit Company, GV Florida Transport, Victory Liner, Partas, Maria De Leon, RCJ Trans, RCJ Lines, Five Star Bus Company, Northern Luzon Bus Line and Dalin liner and other southern Luzon buses.

Sampaloc is served by two Philippine National Railways stations: Laon Laan and España station. It is also served by the Legarda station of the LRT Line 2 to the south.

Main thoroughfares in Sampaloc are S.H. Loyola (formerly Lepanto), Vicente Cruz, M. De La Fuente, P. Florentino, Blumentritt, Aurora Boulevard, Dapitan, Laon Laan, Dimasalang, Maria Clara, Maceda, Padre Campa, Padre Noval, Tomas Earnshaw (Bustillos), Legarda, Gastambide, Recto Avenue, Lerma, Nicanor Reyes (Morayta), Lacson Avenue and España Boulevard. The elevated NLEX Connector also cuts through Sampaloc with two exits in the district at España and Magsaysay.

== Notable people ==
- Arnel Pineda
- Juan Abad
- Mon Confiado
- Pilita Corrales
- Tirso Cruz III
- Lexi Gonzales
- Mon Gualvez
- Angeline Quinto
- Mikee Quintos
- Tuesday Vargas
- Sam Verzosa
- Mitoy Yonting
- Jamie Rivera
- Joet Garcia
- Babalu
- Ronaldo Valdez

== See also ==
- Hugh Wilson Hall
- University Belt
