= Calamba, Laguna =

Component city in Laguna, Philippines

Calamba Kalamba
- Component city
- City of Calamba
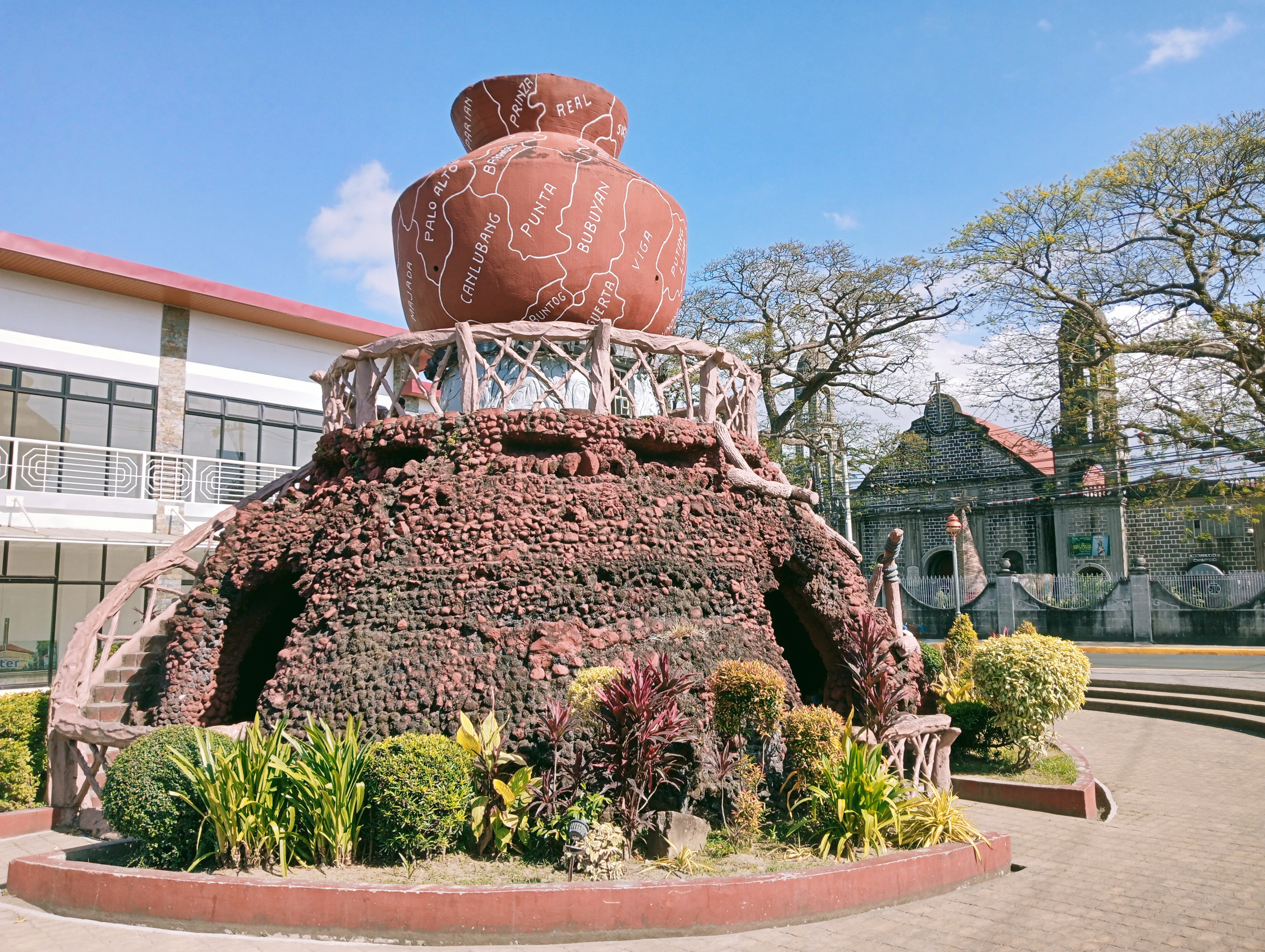
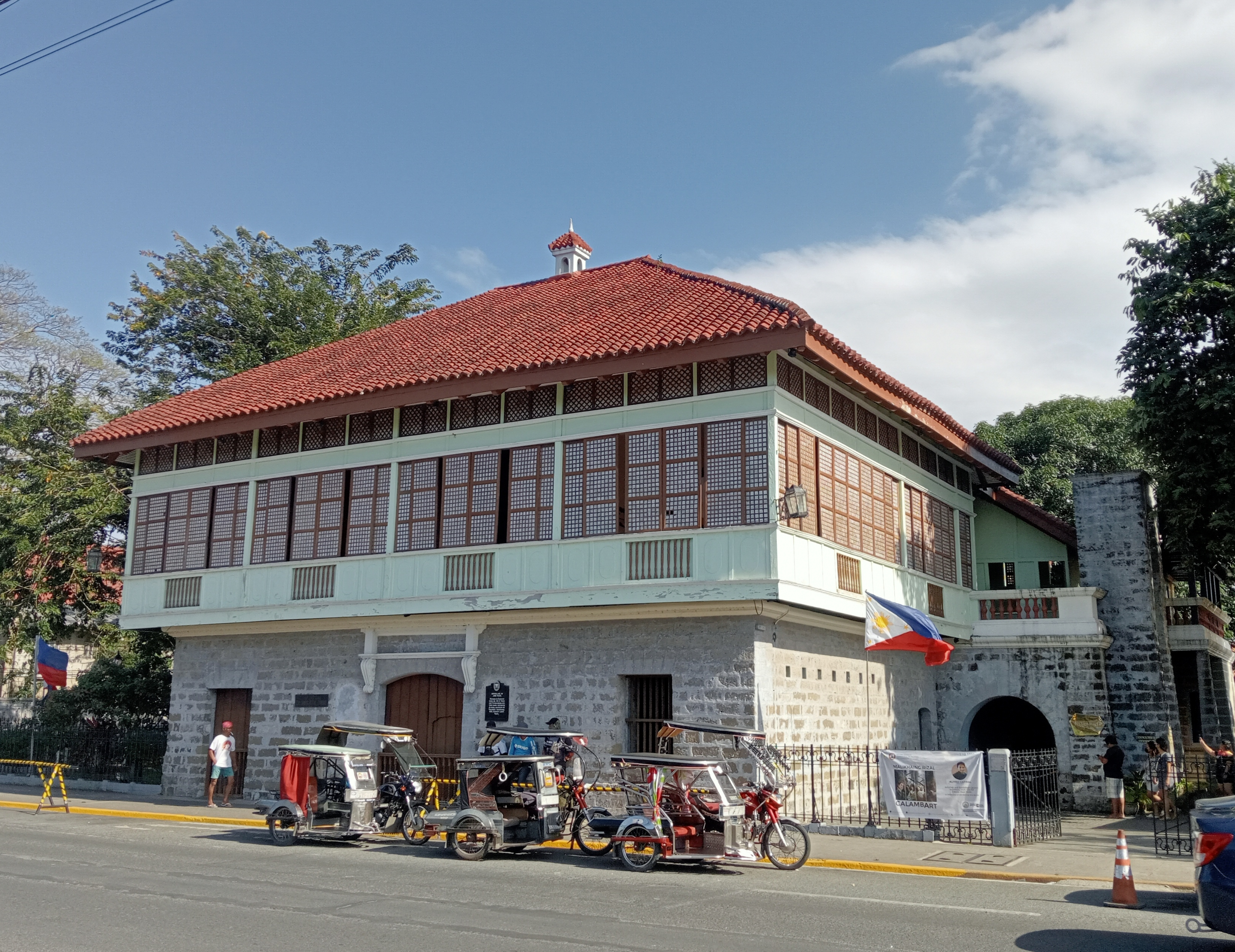
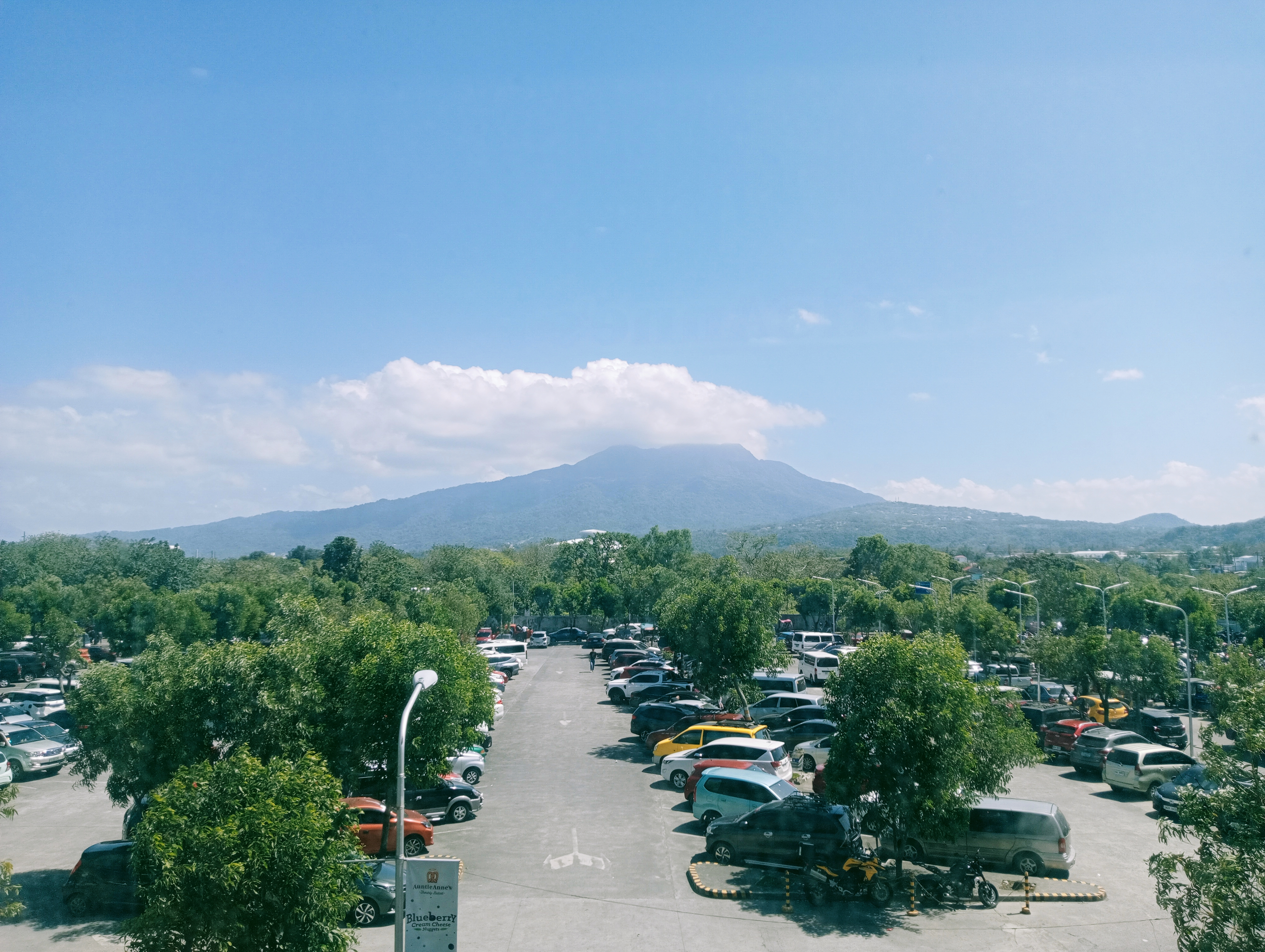
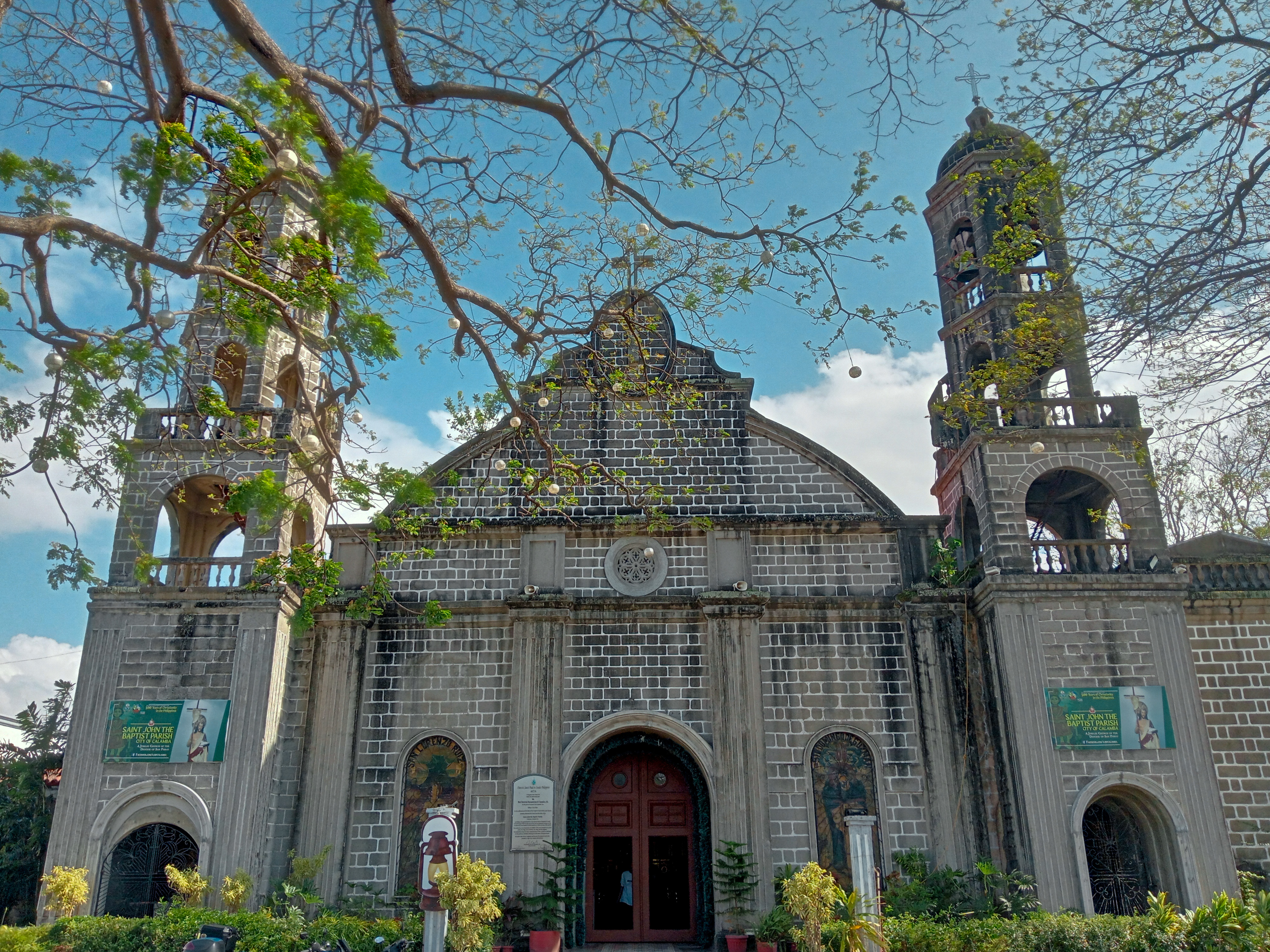
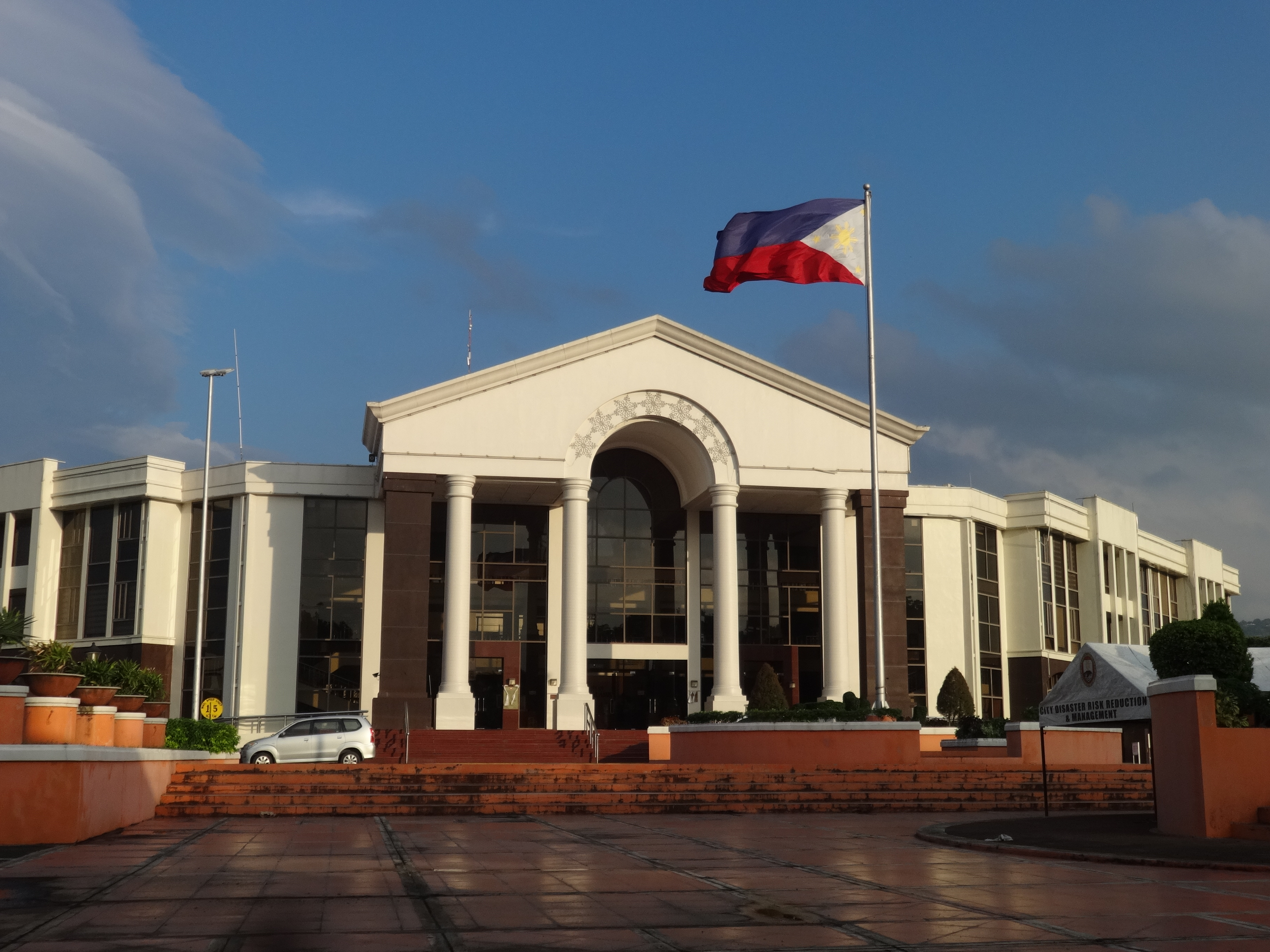
- From top, left to right: Calamba Giant Clay Pot, Jose Rizal Shrine, Mount Makiling, St. John the Baptist Parish Church, and Calamba City Hall.

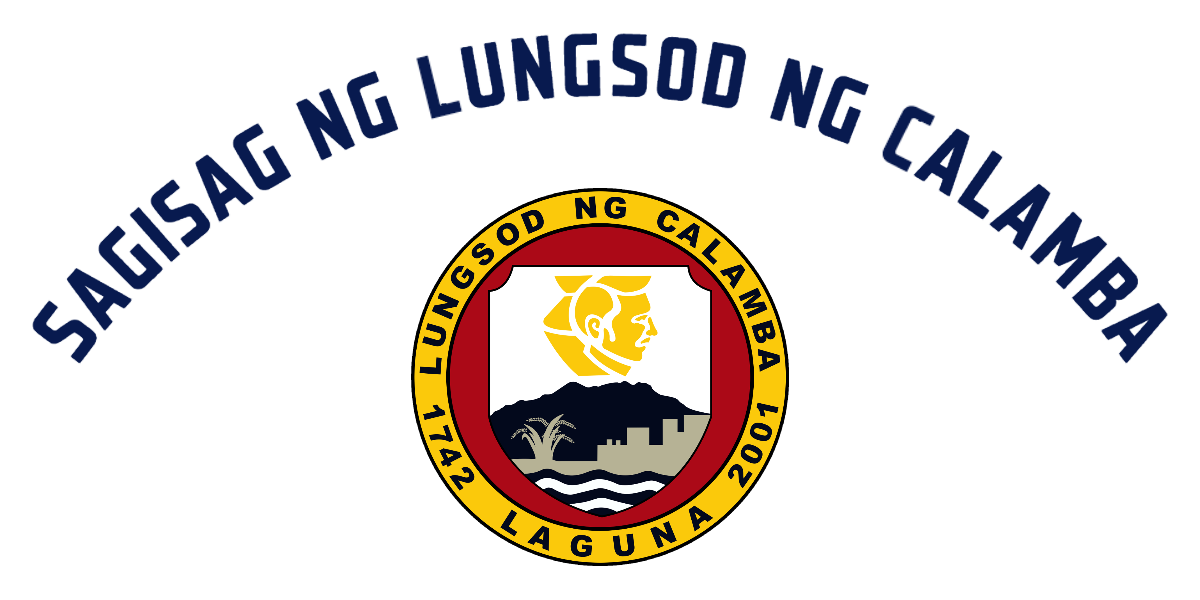
- Flag Seal
- Nicknames: The Premier City of Growth, Leisure and National Pride; Hometown of Jose Rizal; Spring Resort Capital of the Philippines
- Motto: Mabuhay ang Calamba! ("Long live Calamba!")
- Anthem: "Calamba Hymn"
- Map of Laguna with Calamba highlighted
- Interactive map of Calamba
- Location within the Philippines
- Coordinates: 14°13′N 121°10′E
- Country: Philippines
- Region: Calabarzon
- Province: Laguna
- District: Lone district
- Founded: August 28, 1742
- Cityhood: April 21, 2001
- Barangays: 54 (see Barangays)

Government
  - Type: Sangguniang Panlungsod
  - Mayor: Roseller H. Rizal
  - Vice Mayor: Angelito S. Lazaro Jr.
  - Representative: Charisse Anne C. Hernandez
  - City Council: List: Soliman B. Lajara; Joselito G. Catindig; Leeanne P. Aldabe-Cortez; Doreen May F. Cabrera-Silva; Gerard R. Teruel; Maria Katherina V. Silva-Evangelista; Christian Niño S. Lajara; Pursino C. Oruga; Arvin L. Manguiat; Pio C. Dimapilis; Edison M. Natividad; Juan Carlo C. Lazaro; ABC President; Eduardo R. Silva; SK President; Rally E. Bustria
  - Electorate: 332,844 (2022)

Area
  - Total: 149.50 km^{2} (57.72 sq mi)
- Highest elevation: 1,095 m (3,593 ft)
- Lowest elevation: 2 m (6.6 ft)

Population (2024 census)
  - Total: 575,046
  - Rank: 20th
  - Density: 3,846.5/km^{2} (9,962.3/sq mi)
  - Households: 151,604
- Demonym(s): Calambeño (Male), Calambeña (Female), Calambenean

Economy
  - Income class: 1st city income class
  - Poverty incidence: 7.16% (2023)
  - Revenue: ₱ 650.9 million (2024)
  - Assets: ₱ 19,919 million (2024)
  - Expenditure: ₱ 4,577 million (2024)
  - Liabilities: ₱ 7,464 million (2024)

Service provider
  - Electricity: Manila Electric Company (Meralco)
  - Water: Calamba Water District
- Time zone: UTC+8 (PST)
- ZIP code: 4027, 4028, 4029
- PSGC: 043405000
- IDD : area code: +63 (0)49
- Native languages: Tagalog
- Patron saint: Saint John the Baptist
- Website: www.calambacity.gov.ph

Calamba, officially the City of Calamba (Filipino: Lungsod ng Calamba), is a component city in the province of Laguna, Philippines. According to the 2024 census, it has a population of 575,046 people.

Calamba is the regional center of the Calabarzon region. It is situated 50 kilometers (31 mi) south of Manila and 37 kilometers (23 mi) west of Santa Cruz. The city is known as the "Spring Resort Capital of the Philippines" because of its numerous hot spring resorts, which are mostly located in Barangays Pansol, Bucal, Bagong Kalsada, and Lingga.

According to the 2024 census, Calamba has a population of 575,046 people, making it the second most populous local government unit in Laguna. It is the fifth-densest city in the province with more than 2,600 people per square kilometer after San Pedro, Biñan, Cabuyao, and Santa Rosa. Based on the overall rankings of the 2014 Cities and Municipalities Index, the city ranked 18th in the overall competitiveness (cities ranking) and first among cities in the Calabarzon region. Calamba is known to be Calabarzon's richest city because of its numerous industries.

Calamba is the hometown of the de facto Philippine national hero, José Rizal.

== Etymology ==
The name of the city is derived from Tagalog kalamba, meaning a wide-mouthed earthen water jar (also called balanga or banga, cf. Balanga, Bataan). The origin of the name is reflected in the Calamba Jar landmark in city plaza, as well as the city's seal which depicts a water jar superimposed with a profile of José Rizal.

== History ==
=== Early history ===
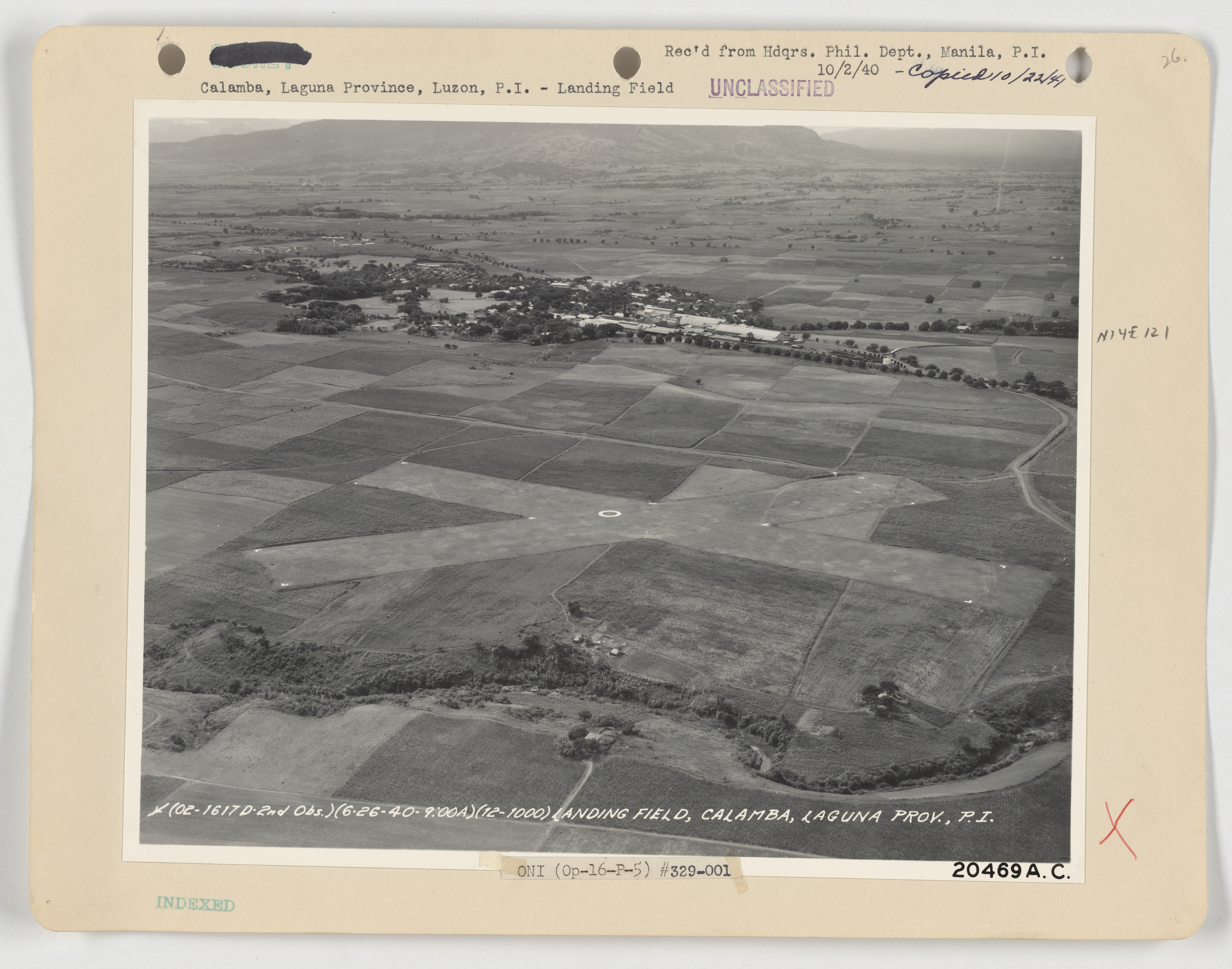
Aerial view of Calamba landing field, circa 1940s

The oldest part of Calamba is believed to be Barangay Sucol where its first settlers remained. With the arrival of Spaniards, the whole area was converted into a hacienda, then a part of Tabuco (present-day Cabuyao). In 1639 Calamba was the site of a rebellion of Chinese farmers, who had been forcibly resettled there by Governor Sebastián Hurtado de Corcuera. This rebellion spread north of the Pasig River and eventually culminated in the deaths of over 20,000 Chinese in the whole region surrounding Manila. Calamba became an independent pueblo on August 28, 1742, and formed into the town of Calamba in 1770. In 1813, Calamba was placed in the hands of "encargados" by the Dominican Brothers, who divided it into portions and sold the haciendas to the natives during the American regime. The 1818 Spanish census recorded the area having 959 native families and 4 Spanish-Filipino families.

=== World War II ===
During the Japanese occupation in World War II, Calamba was the location of a massacre committed by the Imperial Japanese Army, in which at least 2,000 civilians were killed. The St. John the Baptist Church, established in 1859, was burned by the Japanese during World War II. It was reconstructed by Fr. Eliseo Dimaculangan. It was the christening site of José Rizal. The original baptismal font has been preserved and refurbished.

=== Cityhood ===
After a process of more than seven years, Calamba became the second component city of the Laguna by virtue of Republic Act No. 9024, "An Act Converting the Municipality of Calamba, Province of Laguna into a Component City to be known as the City of Calamba." R.A. 9024 was signed into law by President Gloria Macapagal Arroyo on March 5, 2001, at the Malacañan Palace. The Commission on Elections (COMELEC) then set the plebiscite for Calamba's cityhood on April 21, 2001, where 15,056 residents participated. 3,413 or 22.67% voted "No" while the remaining 77.33% voted "Yes" to Calamba's conversion into a component city.

==== Events leading to Cityhood ====
As early as 1994, the town's Sangguniang Bayan approved Resolution No. 60, Series of 1994 requesting the Senate of the Philippines through its president and the House of Representatives through its speaker to co-sponsor a bill for Calamba's conversion into a city. It was only after two years that another resolution, Resolution No. 115 was passed requesting then-Representative Joaquin M. Chipeco Jr., to co-sponsor a bill for Calamba's cityhood and requesting the Sangguniang Panlalawigan for their comments and recommendations regarding the matter. Another two years passed before House Bill No. 986 and Senate bill Nos. 1630 and 1791 were filed in the House of Representatives by Congressman Chipeco and Senate of the Philippines by Senators Franklin M. Drilon and Sergio Osmeña III, respectively.

It was only in the year 2000 that the motion for Calamba's cityhood was fast-tracked. Then Mayor Severino J. Lajara requested favorable endorsement of House Bill No. 986 from the Sangguniang Panlalawigan on January 3, 2000. The Sangguniang Bayan also endorsed House Bill No. 986 and Senate Bill Nos. 1630 and 1791 and also requested favorable endorsement from the Sangguniang Panlalawigan in the same month. A month passed and Mayor Lajara sent a follow-up letter to then Vice Governor Teresita "Ningning" Lazaro on updates regarding the matter.

On March 8, the House Committee on Local Government approved House Bill No. 986 on 2nd reading at a hearing held at Hotel Rembrandt, Quezon City. The same House Committee conducted a public hearing on House Bill No. 986 at the Calamba Elementary School (Central II) gymnasium on March 23, approving the House Bill in principle. House Bill 986 was deliberated in April by the House of Representatives in plenary session and approved as House Bill No. 10661, which was then filed with the Senate of the Philippines in June.

The year 2001 came and brought about approval on 2nd reading of Senate Bill Nos. 1630 and 1791 and House Bill No. 10661 in a hearing held on February 5 at the Ambrocio Padilla Hall, Senate of the Philippines. Three days later, February 8, Senate Bill Nos. 1630 and 1791 and House Bill No. 10661 was deliberated in Plenary Session and was approved as Republic Act No. 9024.

=== Designation as regional center ===
Calamba was declared the regional center of the Calabarzon region by then President Gloria Macapagal Arroyo by virtue of Executive Order No. 246, dated October 28, 2003.

== Geography ==
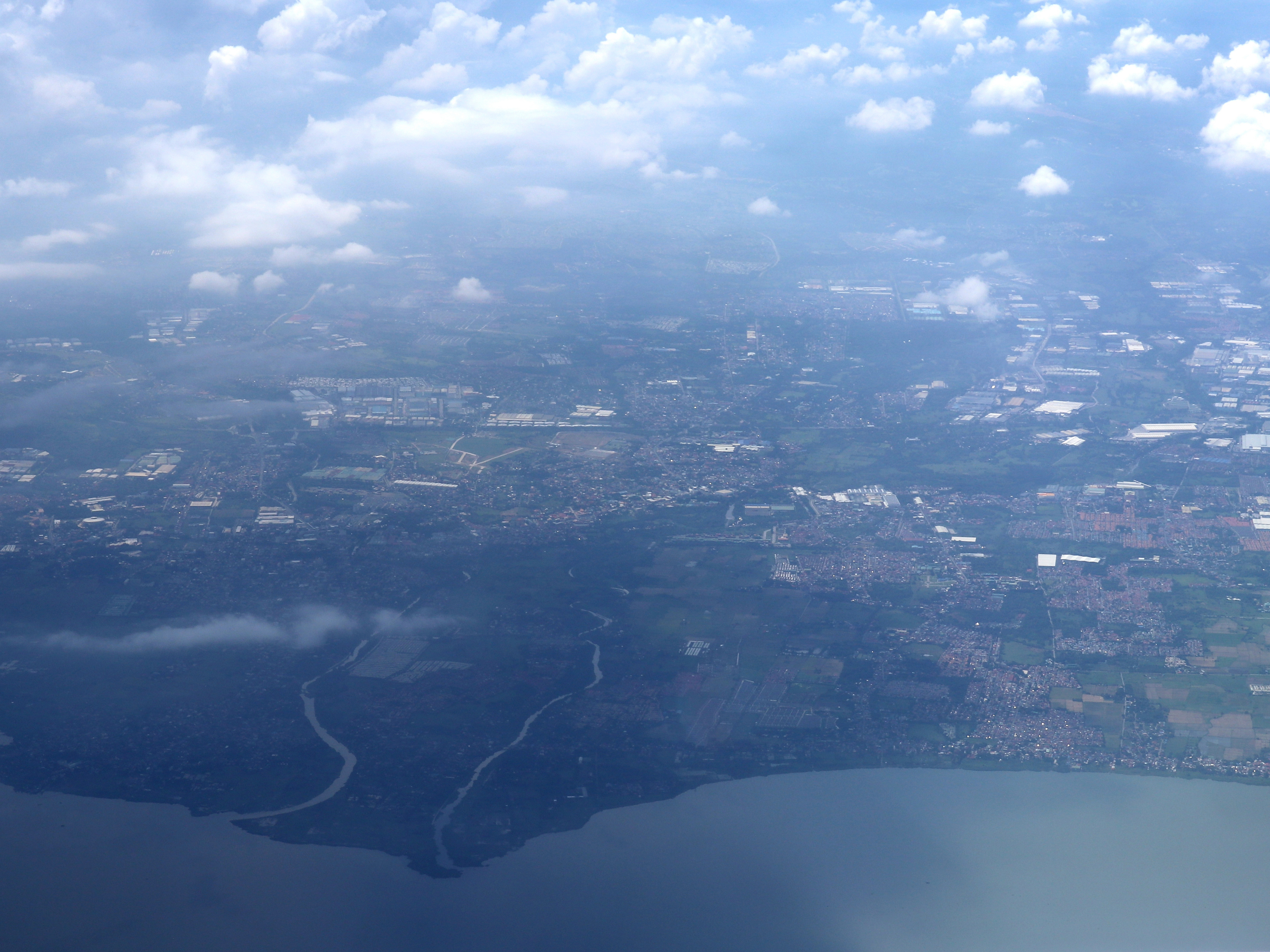
Aerial view of Calamba

Calamba lies on the northern slopes of Mount Makiling, a dormant volcano. The southern terminus of the South Luzon Expressway is in Calamba and this geographic position makes the city a gateway to the southern provinces of Luzon. The highway at the end of the South Luzon Expressway leads east to the other towns of Laguna and south towards the provinces of Batangas and Quezon.

The city is bordered by Cabuyao to the north, by the province of Cavite to the west, specifically Silang and Tagaytay, Los Baños to the east, and by the province of Batangas to the south and southwest, specifically the cities and municipalities of Talisay, Tanauan, and Santo Tomas. Laguna de Bay, the country's largest lake, forms the city's northeast border. The provincial capital, Santa Cruz, is located 37 kilometers (23 mi) by road to the east.

Calamba covers a total land area of 14,950 hectares (36,900 acres), making it is the second-largest city in Laguna province in terms of land area after San Pablo.

=== Land uses ===
Classification	Land Area (hectares)
Urban Redevelopment Zone	2,080
Growth Management Zone 1	4,199
Growth Management Zone 2	2,460
Upland Conservation Zone	3,401.22
Forest Buffer Zone	333
Makiling Forest Reservation Zone	579.78
Agricultural Development Zone	1,427
Shoreland Area	–
Total Land Area	14,480
Urban Expansion Area	8,562.7 ha

=== Barangays ===
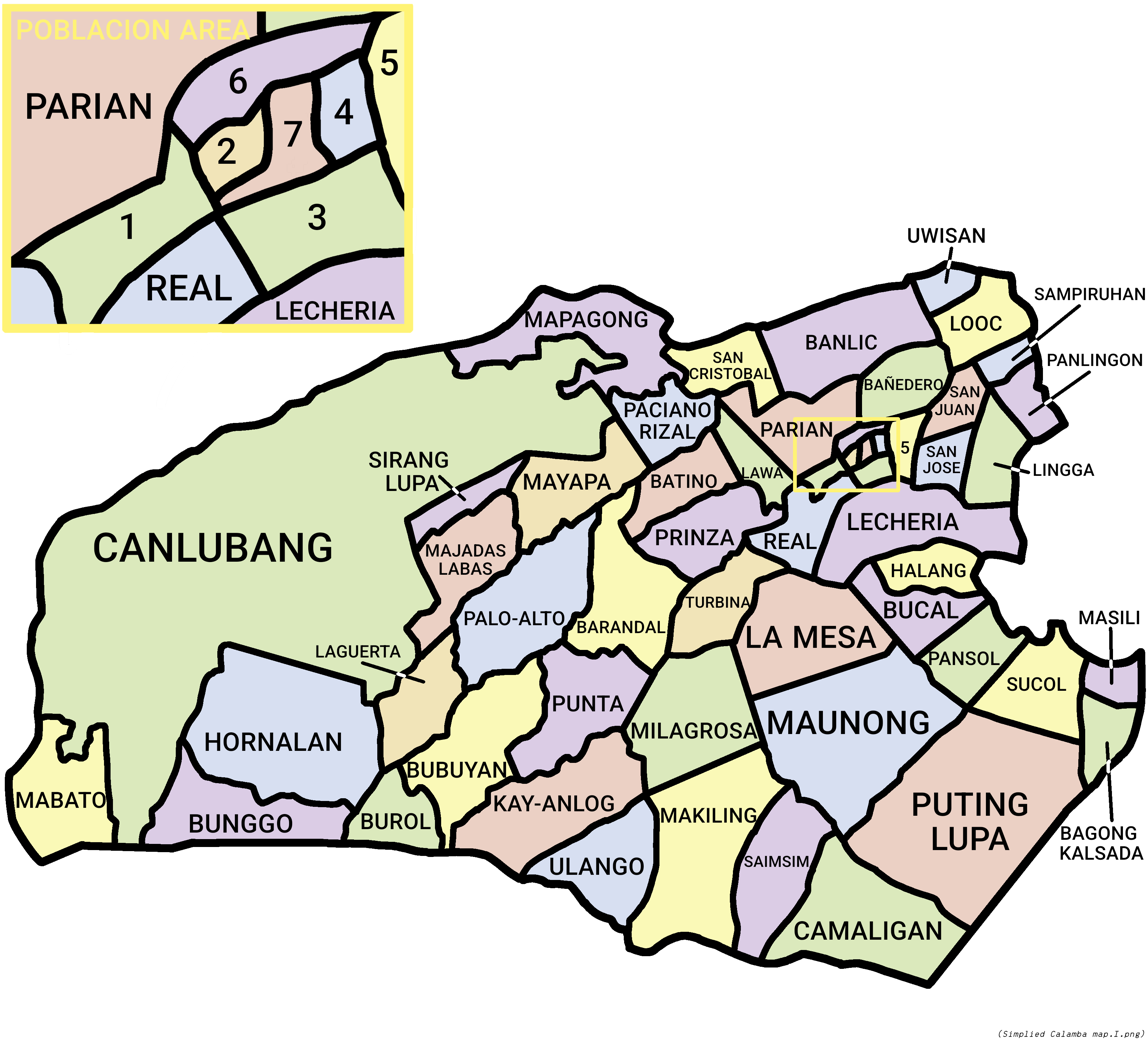
Subdivision/Barangay map of Calamba

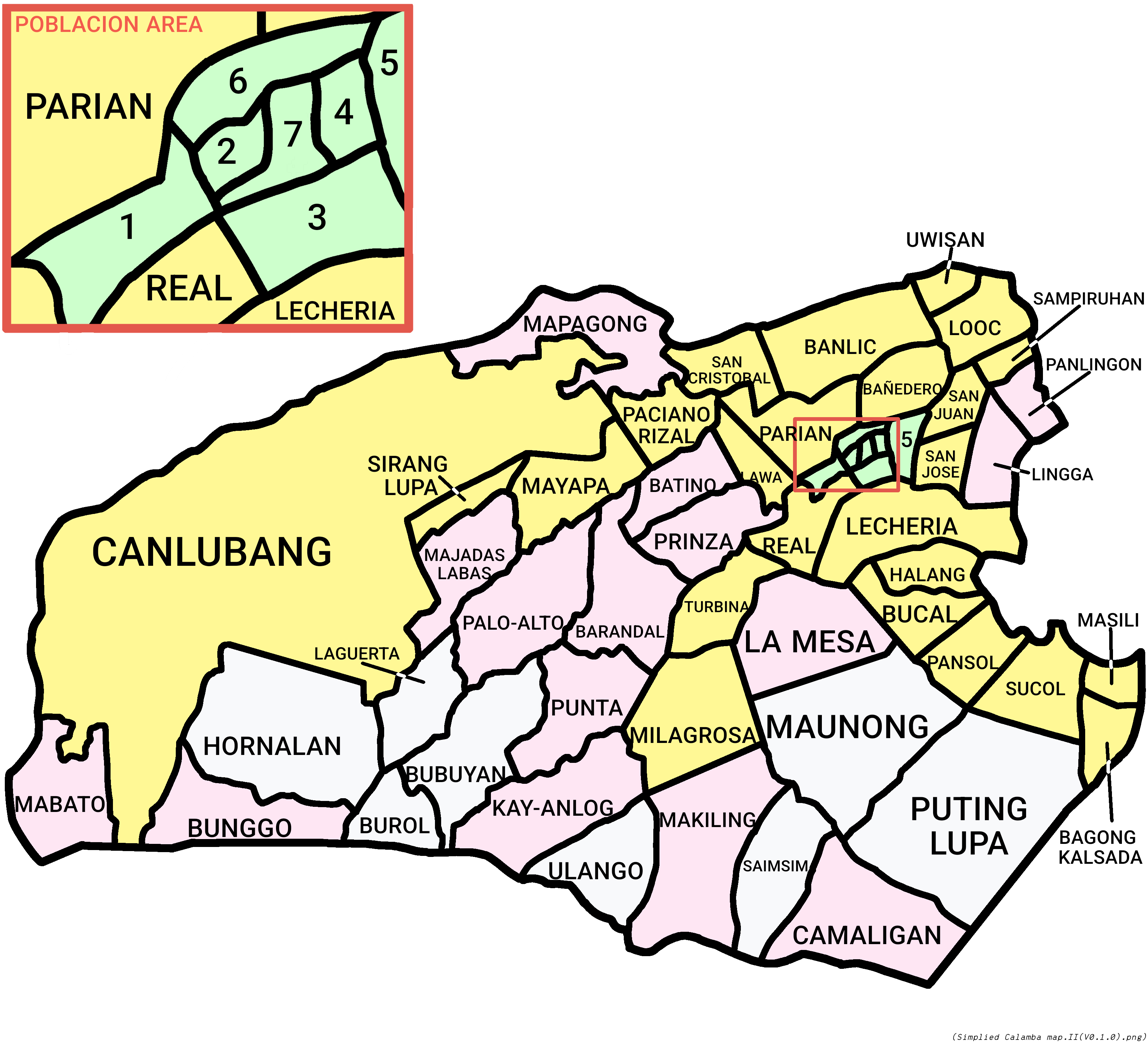
Subdivision/Barangay map of Calamba based on Area Classification; green areas are the Poblacion District

Calamba is politically subdivided into 54 barangays, as indicated in the matrix below. Each barangay consists of puroks and some have sitios.

Barangays of Calamba
No.	Barangay	Barangay chairman	Land Area (hectares)	Population (2024)	Population (2020)	Classification	Zoning Classification
1	Bagong Kalsada	Clemente M. Manato	157.8	3,600	3,892	Urban	Urban Redevelopment Zone
2	Bañadero	Aries B. Hizon	190.0	14,957	12,647	Urban	Agricultural Development Zone
3	Banlic	January Y. Paraso	274.9	20,379	18,335	Urban	Agricultural Development Zone
4	Barandal	Cristina H. Rosales	189.3	19,326	18,076	Rural	Growth Management Zone 1
5	Barangay 1 (Poblacion)	Marcelino T. Tuballas	29.2	4,767	5,823	Urban	Urban Redevelopment Zone
6	Barangay 2 (Poblacion)	Joanne M. De Mesa	17.1	11,053	10,627	Urban	Urban Redevelopment Zone
7	Barangay 3 (Poblacion)	Donnie P. Alvarez	29.8	4,060	4,537	Urban	Urban Redevelopment Zone
8	Barangay 4 (Poblacion)	Joseph L. Emergo	4.5	3,230	3,301	Urban	Urban Redevelopment Zone
9	Barangay 5 (Poblacion)	Matthew B. Rizal	25.6	5,384	5,858	Urban	Urban Redevelopment Zone
10	Barangay 6 (Poblacion)	Andrew A. Balita	42.3	2,757	1,693	Urban	Urban Redevelopment Zone
11	Barangay 7 (Poblacion)	Victor A. Opaco	81.8	2,160	2,357	Urban	Urban Redevelopment Zone
12	Batino	Pio C. Dimapilis	110.5	1,773	1,616	Rural	Growth Management Zone 1 Urban Redevelopment Zone
13	Bubuyan	Madell Donna C. Manaig	196.0	6,255	3,193	Rural	Upland Conservation Zone
14	Bucal	Gil B. Rimas	265.0	14,526	14,289	Urban	Upland Conservation Zone; Urban Redevelopment Zone; Agricultural Development Zone
15	Bunggo	George F. Cabrera	556.6	4,694	4,437	Rural	Upland Conservation Zone
16	Burol	John Kenneth Vence L. Evangelista	258.2	5,524	3,551	Rural	Upland Conservation Zone
17	Camaligan	Victor E. de Castro	106.5	1,360	1,345	Rural	Growth Management Zone 2
18	Canlubang	Larry O. Dimayuga	3,912.0	68,780	60,292	Urban	Growth Management Zone 1 & 2
19	Halang	Aries O. Silva	166.7	8,776	8,582	Urban	Urban Redevelopment Zone; Agricultural Development Zone
20	Hornalan	June M. Oña	22.0	1,945	2,053	Rural	Upland Conservation Zone
21	Kay-Anlog	Nemar G. Mendoza	272.0	21,095	20,487	Rural	Growth Management Zone 2
22	La Mesa	Eduardo R. Silva	294.1	18,808	17,569	Urban	Upland Conservation Zone; Urban Redevelopment Zone; Growth Management Zone
23	Laguerta	Eduardo M. Sanque	314.9	8,455	5,461	Rural	Upland Conservation Zone
24	Lawa	Emmanuel F. Nido	146.6	13,508	12,245	Urban	Urban Redevelopment Zone
25	Lecheria	Rommel P. Casintahan	157.5	12,194	10,907	Urban	Urban Redevelopment Zone; Agricultural Development Zone
26	Lingga	Darwin C. Retusto	45.0	6,662	6,193	Urban	Agricultural Development Zone
27	Looc	Rustan T. Miranda	179.1	29,364	26,819	Urban	Agricultural Development Zone
28	Mabato	Luisito G. Manguiat	273.1	844	724	Rural	Upland Conservation Zone
29	Majada Labas	Rowel G. Fajardo	180.2	11,231	10,571	Urban	Growth Management Zone 1
30	Makiling	Aigrette P. Lajara	465.7	13,691	12,508	Rural	Growth Management Zone 1 & 2
31	Mapagong	Jonathan O. Gaylon	320.8	7,057	7,254	Rural	Urban Redevelopment Zone; Agricultural Development Zone; Growth Management Zone 1
32	Masili	Rhonell C. Malabanan	32.1	3,863	3,827	Urban	Urban Redevelopment Zone
33	Maunong	Joselito S. Estrada	399.2	4,549	4,395	Rural	Upland Conservation Zone; Growth Management Zone 1 & 2
34	Mayapa	Victoria T. Sumbillo	116.3	15,309	28,302	Urban	Growth Management Zone 1
35	Milagrosa	Randy M. Sulit	209.4	12,557	9,687	Urban	Growth Management Zone 1 & 2
36	Paciano Rizal	Napoleon V. Baradas	126.8	17,398	15,679	Urban	Growth Management Zone 2
37	Palingon	Jeffrey Q.	15.3	6,046	5,249	Urban	Agricultural Development Zone
38	Palo-Alto	Nelson C. Unico	273.7	19,279	18,874	Rural	Growth Management Zone 1
39	Pansol	Joel DR. Martinez	528.2	12,099	11,623	Urban	Upland Conservation Zone; Urban Redevelopment Zone; Forest Buffer Zone; Agricultural Development Zone
40	Parian	Rodnie P. Perez	112.0	27,378	25,558	Urban	Agricultural Development Zone; Urban Redevelopment Zone
41	Prinza	Marvin D. Atienza	95.3	5,034	5,284	Rural	Urban Redevelopment Zone; Growth Management Zone 1
42	Punta	Justino P. Carandang	331.0	8,639	7,321	Rural	Growth Management Zone 1 & 2
43	Puting Lupa	Allan S. Pedraja	542.0	2,390	2,389	Rural	Upland Conservation Zone; Growth Management Zone 2 Forest Buffer Zone
44	Real	Florencio A. Morales, Jr.	132.9	18,607	16,371	Urban	Urban Redevelopment Zone
45	Saimsim	Apolonio P. Manalo Jr.	194.5	6,776	6,166	Rural	Growth Management Zone 1
46	Sampiruhan	James Philip C. Dumalaon	81.0	9,740	9,466	Urban	Agricultural Development Zone
47	San Cristobal	Irineo T. Logo	119.0	15,096	14,881	Urban	Urban Redevelopment Zone
48	San Jose	Reginald C. Oliva	89.6	4,393	4,061	Urban	Urban Redevelopment Zone
49	San Juan	Danilo Q. Amparo	15.3	6,455	4,826	Urban	Urban Redevelopment Zone
50	Sirang Lupa	Ronaldo M. Contreras	198.4	12,636	12,938	Urban	Growth Management Zone 1
51	Sucol	Edgar A. Balagtas	31.6	5,255	5,233	Urban	Urban Redevelopment Zone
52	Turbina	Rodel V. Manalo	51.5	5,541	6,268	Urban	Urban Redevelopment Zone
53	Ulango	Andro M. Evangelista	227.6	1,067	1,060	Rural	Upland Conservation Zone
54	Uwisan	Catalina P. Aldabe	78.0	6,724	2,971	Urban	Agricultural Development Zone

=== Climate ===
Calamba has a tropical monsoon climate (type Am), with a short dry season and a longer rainy season. The dry season lasts only from January to April, and the rest of the year is characterized by high levels of rainfall.

Climate data for Calamba (averages 1982–2012)
Month	Jan	Feb	Mar	Apr	May	Jun	Jul	Aug	Sep	Oct	Nov	Dec	Year
Mean daily maximum °C (°F)	29.3 (84.7)	30.3 (86.5)	31.9 (89.4)	33.3 (91.9)	33.5 (92.3)	32.4 (90.3)	31.4 (88.5)	31 (88)	31.1 (88.0)	30.9 (87.6)	30.3 (86.5)	29.3 (84.7)	31.2 (88.2)
Daily mean °C (°F)	25.4 (77.7)	25.9 (78.6)	27 (81)	28.5 (83.3)	28.9 (84.0)	28.2 (82.8)	27.5 (81.5)	27.3 (81.1)	27.3 (81.1)	27.1 (80.8)	26.6 (79.9)	25.7 (78.3)	27.1 (80.8)
Mean daily minimum °C (°F)	21.5 (70.7)	21.5 (70.7)	22.2 (72.0)	23.5 (74.3)	24.2 (75.6)	24 (75)	23.6 (74.5)	23.6 (74.5)	23.5 (74.3)	23.3 (73.9)	22.9 (73.2)	22.2 (72.0)	23.0 (73.4)
Average precipitation mm (inches)	54 (2.1)	26 (1.0)	29 (1.1)	36 (1.4)	160 (6.3)	199 (7.8)	290 (11.4)	265 (10.4)	245 (9.6)	248 (9.8)	141 (5.6)	79 (3.1)	1,772 (69.6)
Source: Climate-data.org

== Demographics ==
The population of Calamba is fast-growing with an intercensal growth rate of 5% from 1995 to 2000, repeated and more in subsequent decades (except for 2007 to 2010 census).

Population census of Calamba
Year	Pop.	±% p.a.
1903	8,058	—
1918	18,062	+5.53%
1939	32,363	+2.82%
1948	36,586	+1.37%
1960	57,715	+3.87%
1970	82,714	+3.66%
1975	97,432	+3.34%
1980	121,175	+4.46%
1990	173,453	+3.65%
1995	218,951	+4.46%
2000	281,146	+5.51%
2007	360,281	+3.48%
2010	389,377	+2.87%
2015	454,486	+2.99%
2020	539,671	+3.68%
2024	575,046	+1.54%
Source: Philippine Statistics Authority

View source data.

Population density
Year	Density
1990	1,160/km^{2}
1995	1,460/km^{2}
2000	1,900/km^{2}
2007	2,400/km^{2}
2010	2,600/km^{2}
2015	3,000/km^{2}
2020	3,600/km^{2}

According to the 2024 census, Calamba has a population of 575,046 inhabitants, making it the most populated city in Laguna province, followed by Santa Rosa, Biñan, San Pedro City, Cabuyao, and San Pablo. Calamba is the 24th most populated city in the Philippines.

Calamba is predominantly Roman Catholic (84.22%), followed by Members Church of God International (MCGI or ADD)(4.5%), Protestants (3.43%), Iglesia ni Cristo (3.14%), and Islam (0.26%).

== Economy ==
Poverty incidence of Calamba (%)

Source: Philippine Statistics Authority

Calamba is known today as the "Richest City in Calabarzon", (according to the 2014 Commission on Audit Annual Audit Report), as it registered a total income of ₱2,501,048,126.00. Calamba is also considered one of the "Next Wave Cities" for outsourcing firms.

The major income sources comes from manufacturing and economic plants, tourism, agriculture and services. There are many manufacturing and economic plants located in upland barangays like Canlubang, Real, La Mesa, Milagrosa, Makiling, Punta, Barandal, Batino and Prinza.

=== Income ===
Year	Total income (COA)	Growth %	Total Income (BLGF)	Growth %
2002	₱810,569,652.58		₱809,806,000.00	
2003	₱847,402,297.32	▲4.54%	₱1,046,621,000.00	▲29.24%
2004	₱872,473,683.19	▲2.96%	₱921,272,904.23	▼ −11.98%
2005	₱1,035,488,459.60	▲18.68%	₱1,094,639,552.79	▲18.82%
2006	₱1,110,330,981.73	▲7.23%	₱1,110,330,981.73	▲1.43%
2007	₱1,161,438,445.76	▲4.60%	₱1,162,050,643.28	▲4.66%
2008	₱1,338,299,724.69	▲15.23%	₱1,338,769,422.02	▲15.21%
2009	₱1,580,699,818.00	▲18.11%	₱1,586,541,340.26	▲18.51%
2010	₱1,634,025,898.00	▲3.37%	₱1,699,391,678.99	▲7.11%
2011	₱1,952,122,303.00	▲19.47%	₱1,887,800,323.68	▲11.09%
2012	₱2,023,350,771.00	▲3.65%	₱2,023,350,600.11	▲7.18%
2013	₱2,191,286,734.00	▲8.30%		
2014	₱2,501,048,126.00	▲14.14%		

=== Banking ===
As of December 31, 2013, there are 83 banking offices operating in the city that offers banking services to businesses and residents according to Philippine Deposit Insurance Corporation. Calamba is the top city in Calabarzon with total deposits amounting to 29,632,884 in thousand pesos from 374,122 accounts.

=== Industries and manufacturing ===
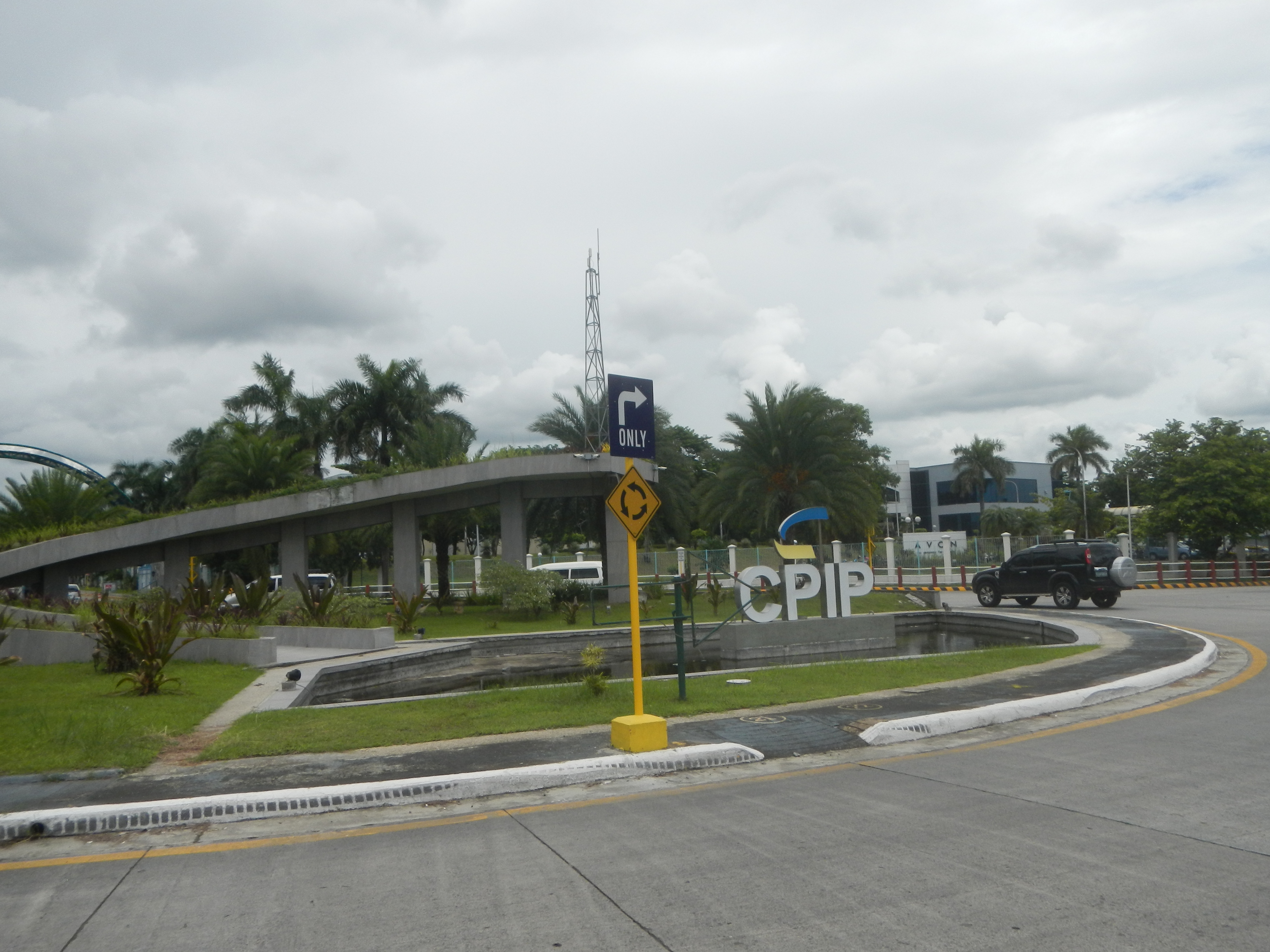
Calamba Premiere International Park

The city is a haven for industries. Considered the heart of Calabarzon due to the number of companies housed in its area, Calamba is one of the premiere industrial hubs outside of Metro Manila. Some of the industrial parks located in the city are:

In 2019, a 2.16 MWp rooftop solar installation at New Zealand Creamery, located in Carmelray Industrial Park 1, was recognized with the Asian Power Award for Solar Power Project of the Year (Philippines).

- Allegis IT Park (Barangay Milagrosa)
- Calamba Premiere International Park (Barangays Batino, Barandal and Prinza)
- Canlubang Industrial Estate (Barangay Canlubang)
- Carmelray Industrial Park 1 (Barangays Canlubang)
- Carmelray Industrial Park 2 (Barangays Milagrosa & Punta)
- Carmelray International Business Park (Barangay Canlubang)
- Filinvest Technology Park (Barangays Punta, Burol, and Bubuyan)
- Light Industry and Science Park of the Philippines II (Barangays Real and La Mesa)
- NYK-TDG IT Park (Barangay Canlubang)
- SMPIC Special Economic Zone (Barangay Paciano Rizal)
- YTMI Realty Special Economic Zone (Barangay Makiling)

=== Information technology ===
Calamba is also considered one of the "Next Wave Cities" for outsourcing firms and call centers, among which is SPi Technologies.

=== Commerce and trade ===
Shopping malls

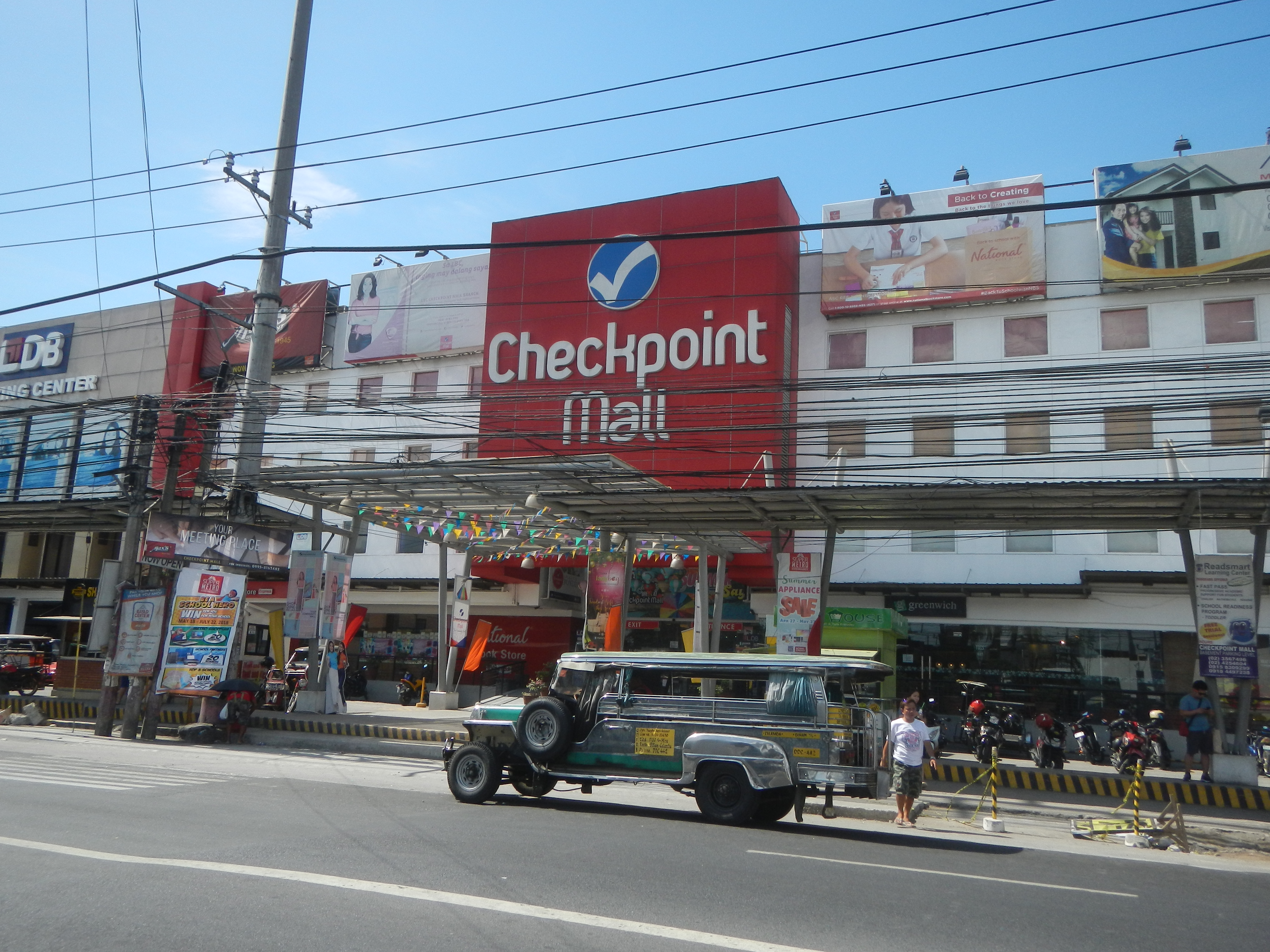
Checkpoint Mall in Paciano Rizal

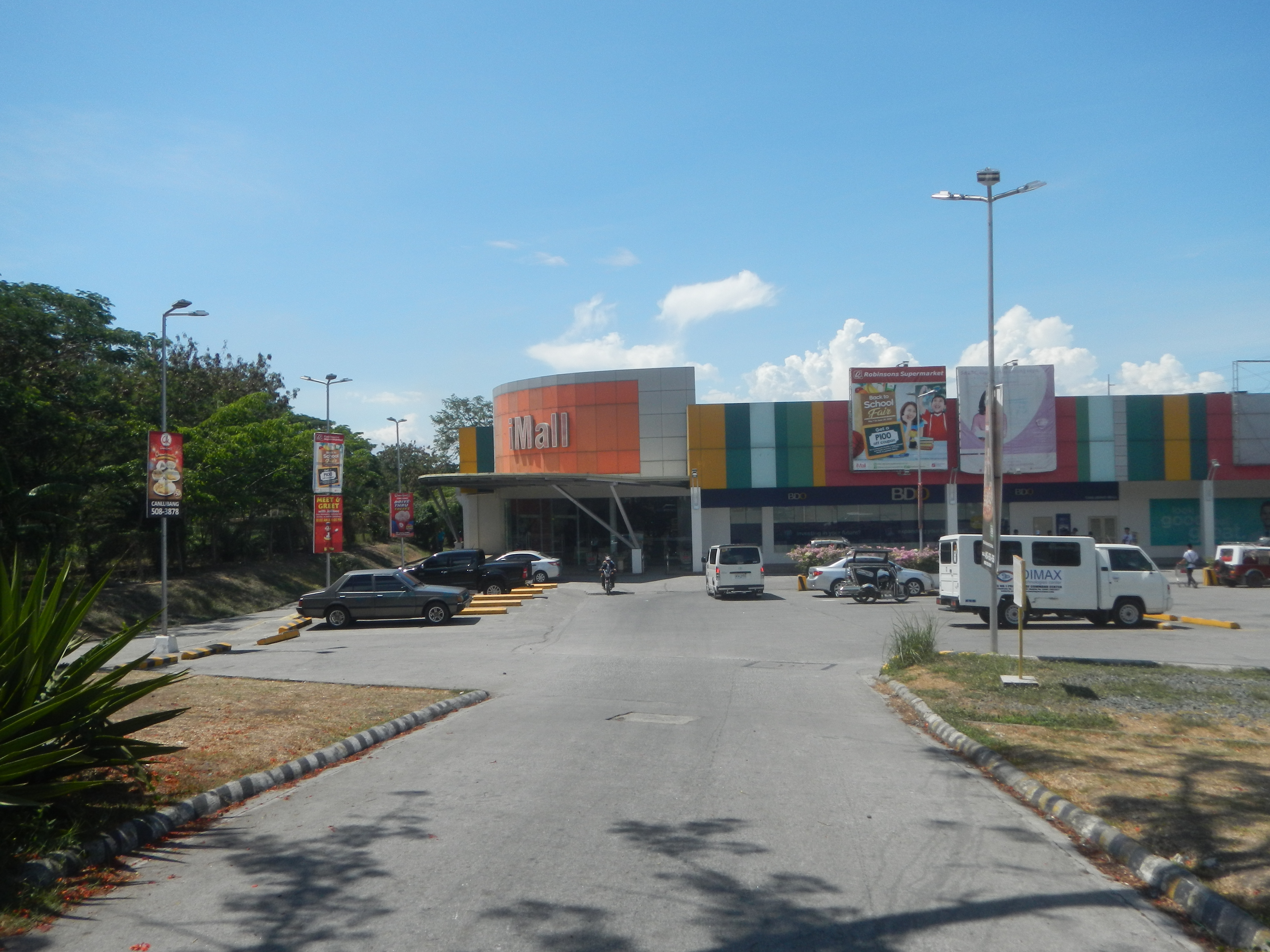
iMall in Canlubang

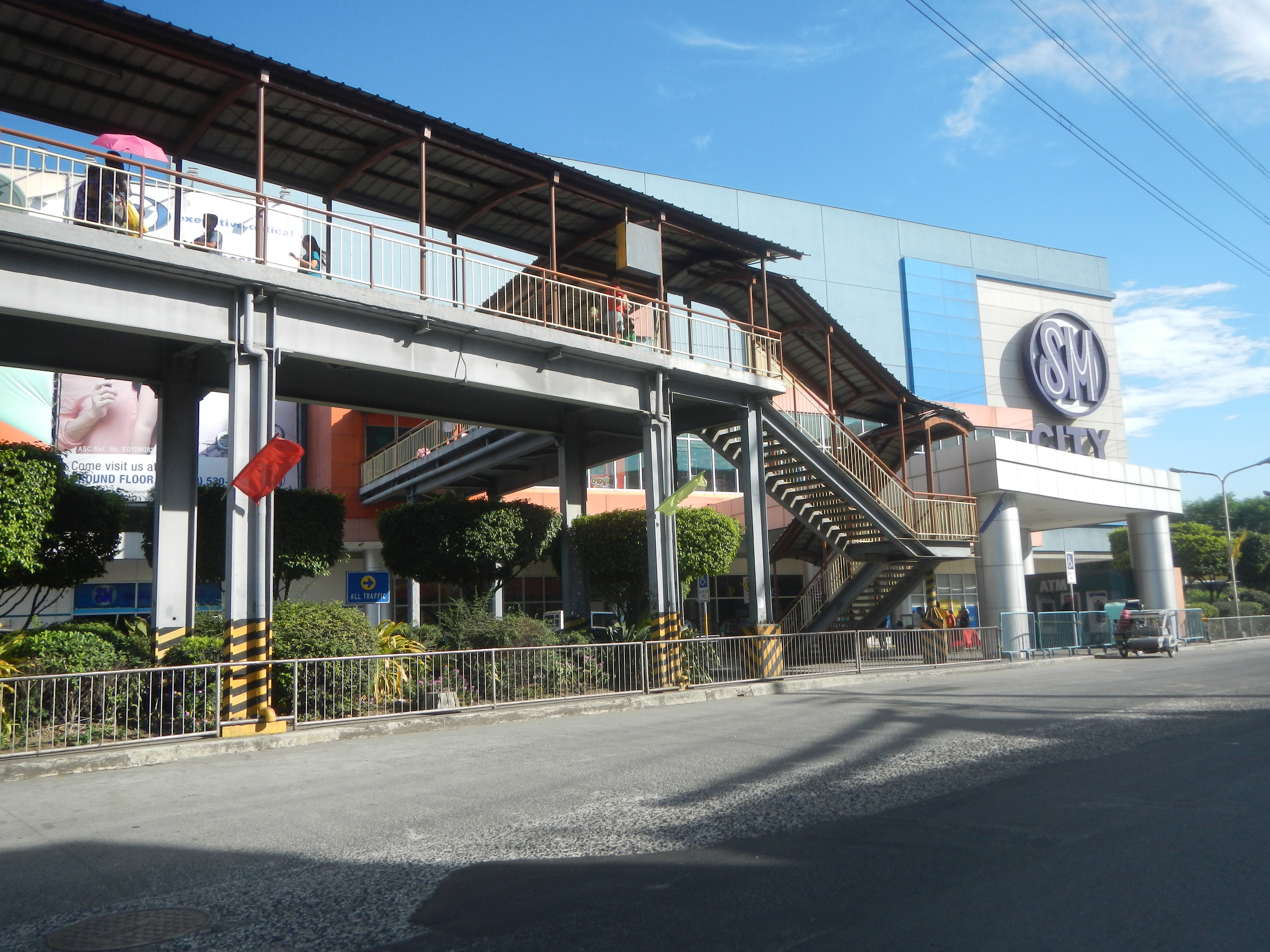
SM City Calamba in Real

Aside from the Crossing area in Barangay Uno, Barangays Real and Parian are also bustling with business structures, including SM City Calamba, and Liana's Discount Center Calamba.

Notable shopping centers and travel agencies in Calamba also include Southern Sky Travel & Tours (Calamba Headquarters), Walter Mart Makiling, Puregold Halang, Puregold Calamba-Crossing, Puregold Calamba-Bayan, Checkpoint Mall, and iMall Canlubang among others.

Food processing plants in Calamba like Zenith Foods Corporation (central commissary of Jollibee Foods Corporation), where its sauces and food products (i.e. burger, pies, fries, etc.) are first made before distributing to Jollibee outlets is currently the most advanced food processing plant in the Philippines and one of the best in Asia. Other food and beverage processing plants in Calamba are Rebisco, RC Cola, Monde M.Y. San Corporation and Zest-O Corporation.

Some of the semiconductor companies are also located in Calamba. To name a few, they are Samsung Electro-Mechanics Philippines, Continental Temic Electronics Philippines, Toshiba Storage Device Philippines Inc., ST Microelectronics (formerly Philips Electronics), Fuji Electric Philippines, NEC Tokin Electronics, NEC Toppan Circuit Solutions and Austriamicrosystems Phils.

Automobile manufacturers that have plants located in Calamba are Asian Transmission Corporation and Suzuki Philippines Inc.

Avon, the leading global beauty company has a manufacturing plant (Avon Products Manufacturing), is located at Calamba Premiere International Park.

== Infrastructure ==
=== Transportation ===
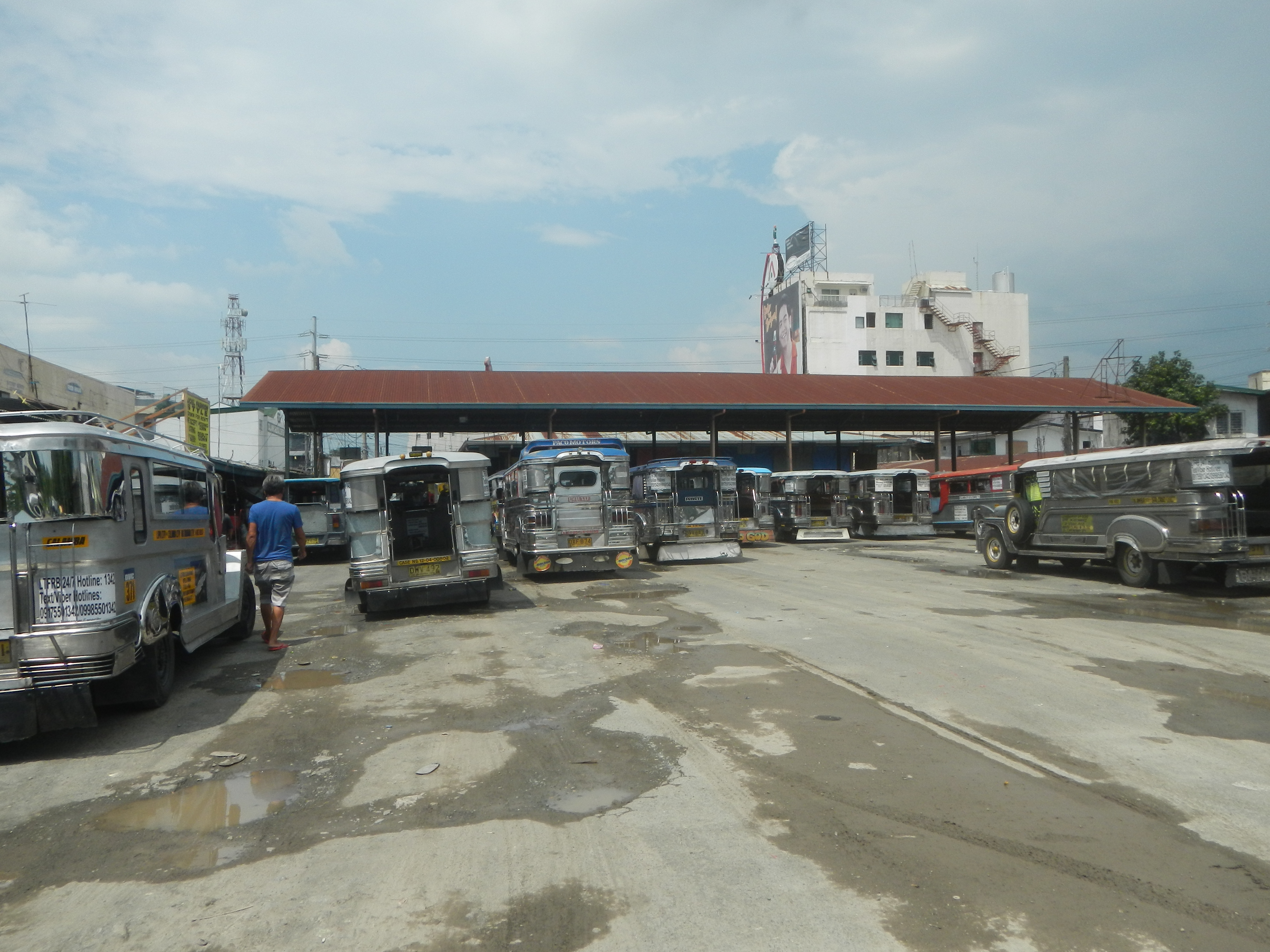
Jeepneys at the Calamba Central Terminal

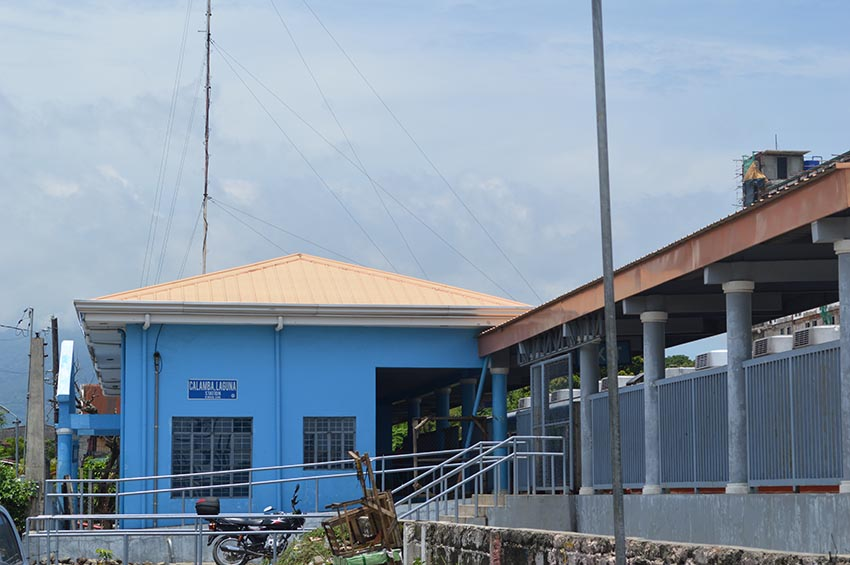
Calamba PNR Station

Tricycles, buses, jeepneys, and UV Express are popular modes of transportation in Calamba.

Calamba is served by the Philippine National Railways (PNR) Metro Commuter Line. Stations include:

- Calamba, at the city proper. This will serve as the terminal for the North–South Commuter Railway (NSCR) and a stop for intercity trains headed for Bicol and Batangas.
- Pansol – flag stop, served by trains between Manila and the International Rice Research Institute (IRRI) in Los Baños.

==== Roads ====
The only expressway currently operational in Calamba is the South Luzon Expressway (SLEX), which passes through the city with four exits. SLEX is part of AH26 up to Calamba Exit.

Main national highways include the Manila South Road, the Pan-Philippine Highway (also known as Maharlika Highway, Daang Maharlika, or National Highway), which passes through the city and curves toward Santo Tomas in Batangas, and Calamba–Pagsanjan Road (also called "National Highway") links Calamba with Los Baños and Santa Cruz.

Other arterial roads includes Chipeco Avenue and its Extension, which passes near the city hall, Tagaytay–Calamba Road, which picks up near Tagaytay Highlands, and Mayapa–Canlubang Cadre Road, a spur of Maharlika Highway serving Canlubang and Canlubang/Mayapa Exit (Exit 47).

Proposed expressways include the Calamba–Los Baños Expressway, which spurs from SLEX, traverses along Laguna de Bay and ends on a national highway at Bay, and Laguna Lakeshore Expressway Dike, an expressway and dike that will run on the coast of Laguna de Bay. The projects will cost an estimated ₱5.9 billion ($131.11 million) and ₱18.59 billion ($413 million).

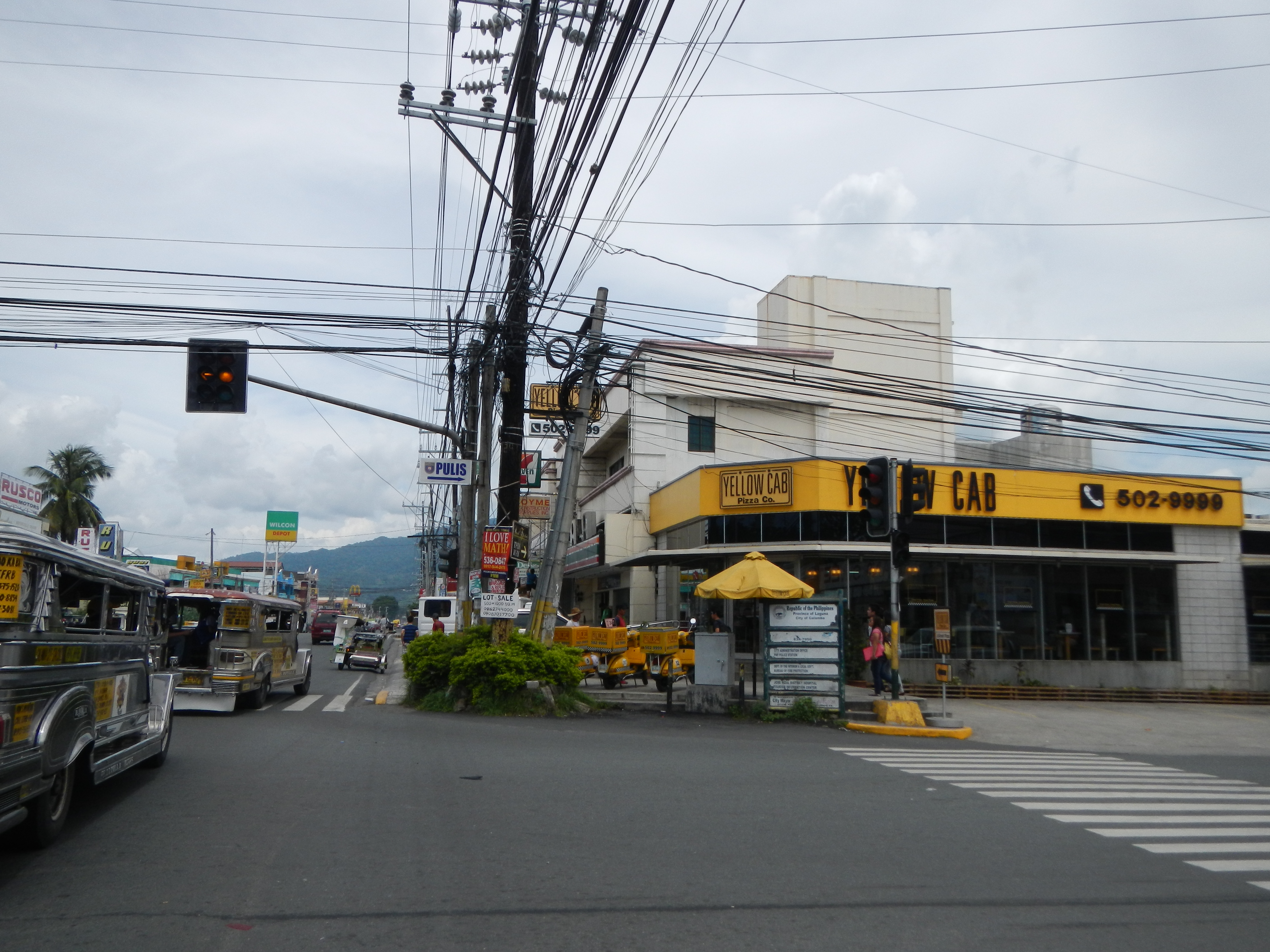
Stop Light in Halang

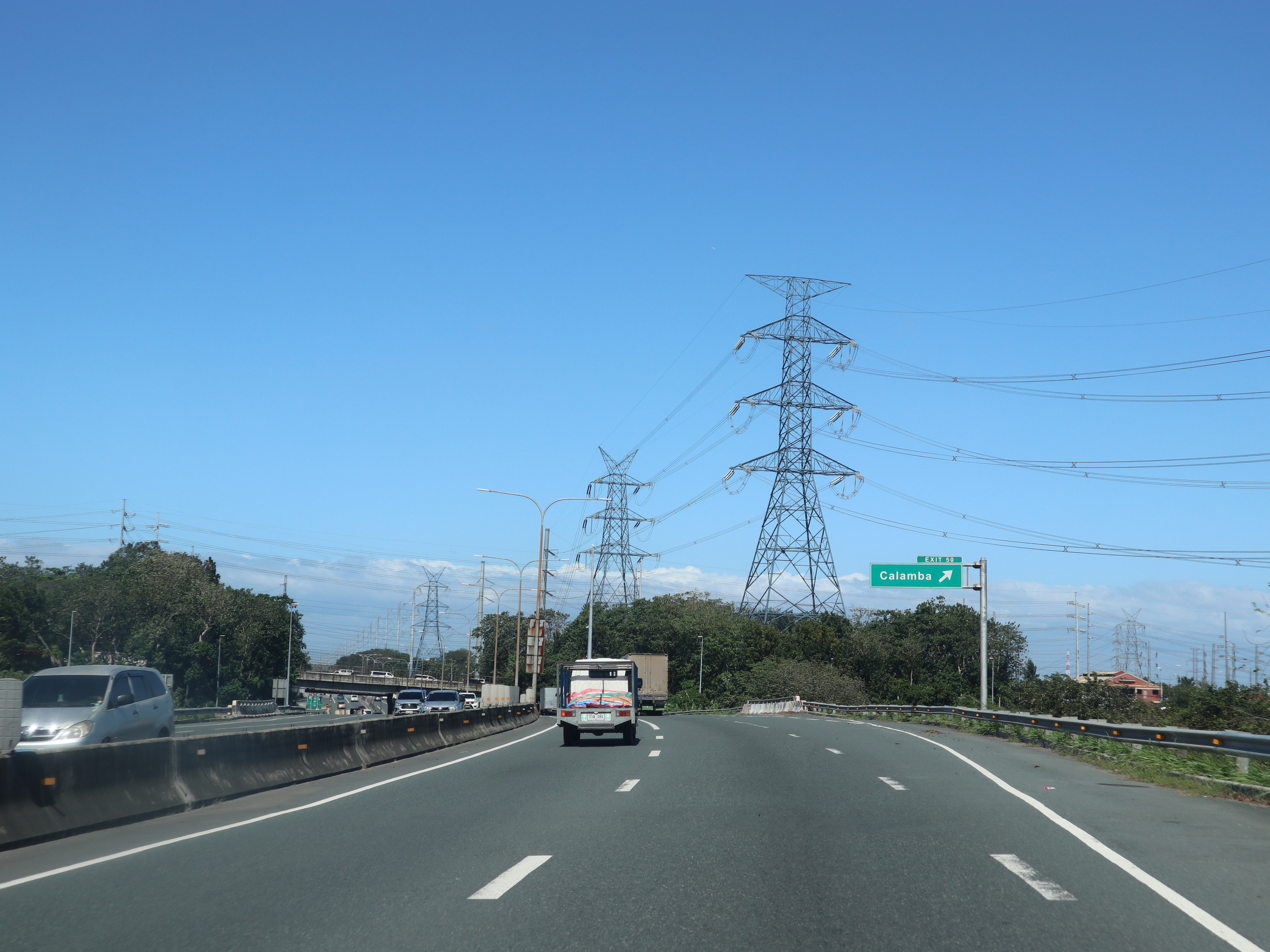
South Luzon Expressway (view from northbound) approaching Calamba Exit

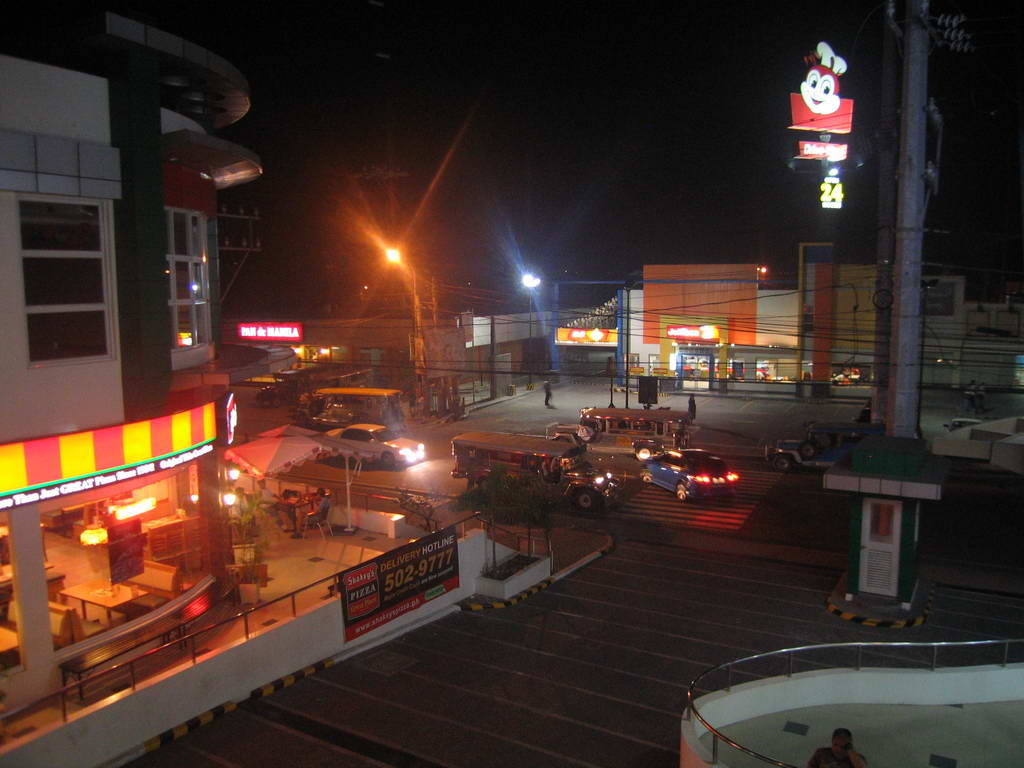
Checkpoint, captured at Paseo De Calamba in Paciano Rizal

=== Health care ===
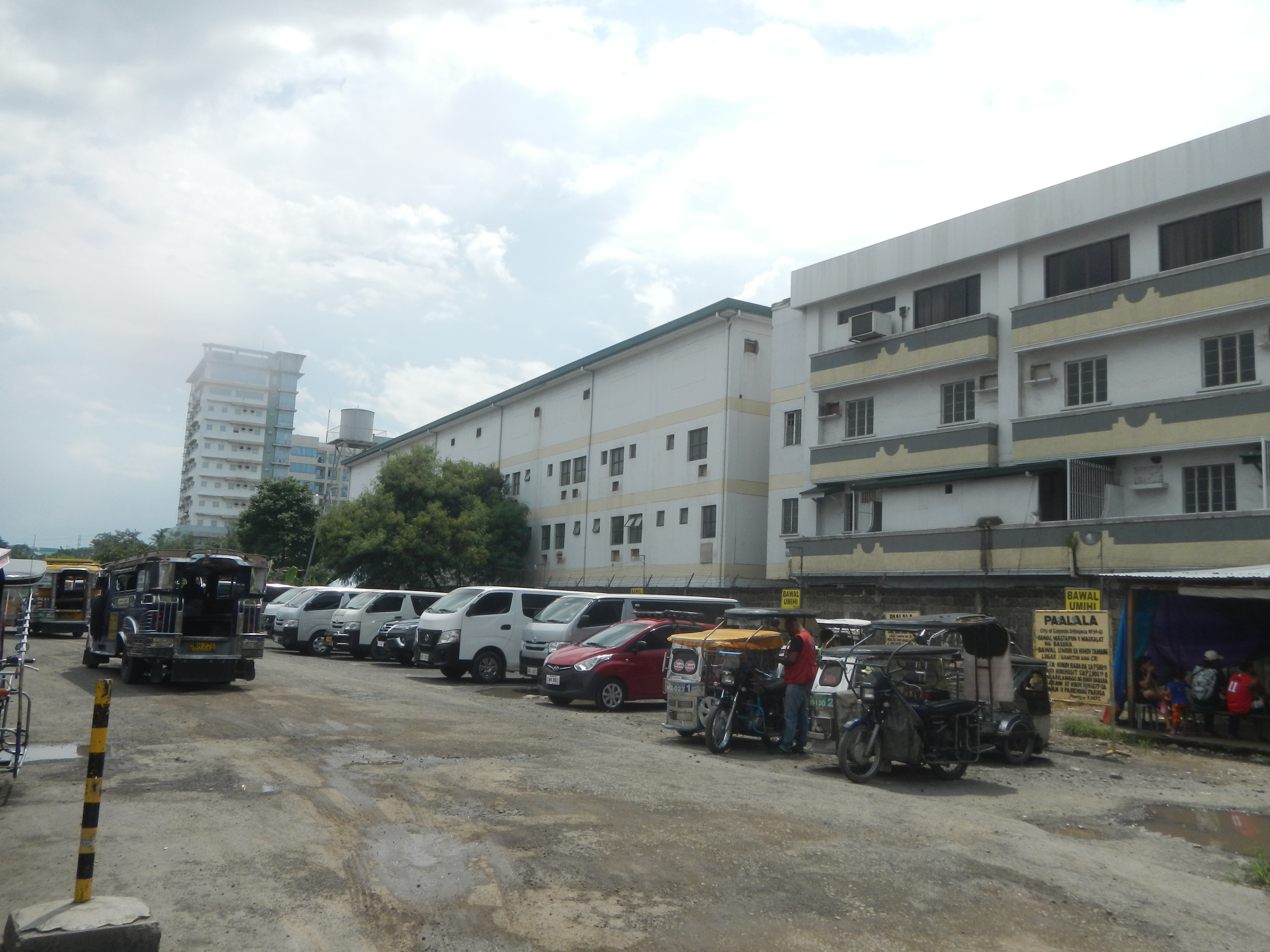
CMC Medical Center & Tower in Barangay Real.

There are 9 private and 1 government-run hospitals in Calamba. Some of the health centers in the city are the Calamba Medical Center, Calamba Doctors' Hospital, Pamana Golden Care Hospital, St. John the Baptist Hospital, San Jose Hospital and Trauma Center, St. Marks Hospital Medical Center, Holy Angel General Hospital, CH Garcia Medical and Diagnostic Center, Dr. Jose Rizal Memorial Hospital, and Jose Yulo Foundation Canlubang Industrial Hospital...

=== Utilities and communication ===
Communication concerns are managed by different agencies found in the city: postal affairs rests on the Philippine Postal Corp. with three operating offices located in Barangays. Canlubang, Mayapa and the main office located at the back of City Hall. Telecommunications as well as internet connections are under the four major telecom companies such as PLDT (Smart Communications), Globe Telecom, Dito Telecommunity and Converge ICT Solutions Inc., commonly referred to as Converge. Aside from these, print and radio services are also present, with Calambalita DZLN-AM and DZJV – a local radio station catering to the whole Calabarzon area.

A major part of the city is currently served by Meralco, with two substations of the company located in Brgys Mayapa and Brgy 1 facilitate the flow of power throughout the entire city. All the 54 barangays are equipped with electricity, with only a few barangays such as part of Canlubang, Pansol, Bucal and Lecheria under NAPOCOR.

A big part of the city is served by the Calamba Water District, providing water to 23,655 households, 1,238 commercial establishments and 53 public buildings. Most of the city's water supply comes from the faucet community water system.

== Government ==
=== Local government ===
City Mayor of Calamba, Laguna
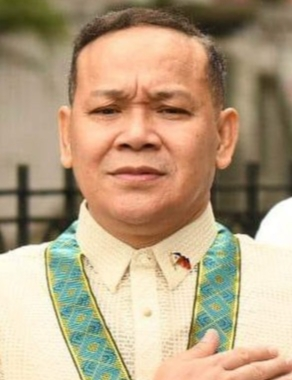
- Incumbent; Roseller H. Rizal since June 30, 2022
- Style: (Mr.) Mayor, Mayor
- Residence: New Calamba City Hall Building, Real, Calamba, Laguna
- Appointer: Elected via popular vote
- Term length: 3 years (maximum of three consecutive terms)
- Inaugural holder: Mateo Elojorde
- Formation: 1901

Like other cities in the Philippines, Calamba is governed by a city mayor and city vice mayor who are elected to three-year terms. The city mayor is the executive head who leads the city's departments in the execution of city ordinances and in the delivery of public services. The city vice mayor heads a legislative council that is composed of 14 members: 12 councilors and two ex-officio offices: one for the Sangguniang Kabataan Federation President, representing the youth sector, and one for the Association of Barangay Chairmen President as the barangay sectoral representative. The council is in charge of creating the city's policies in the form of ordinances and resolutions.

By virtue of Republic Act no. 11078, Calamba has been separated from the 2nd District of Laguna to form its own, the Lone district of the City of Calamba.

=== Elected officials ===
The 2025 local elections in Calamba, held in May 2025, replaced some members of the city government, primarily on the members of the city council. The mayor and vice mayor are term limited.

Elected officials for the 2025–2028 term are:

Calamba city officials (2025–2028)
Name	Party
House of Representatives
Charisse Anne C. Hernandez-Alcantara	Lakas
City Mayor
Roseller "Ross" H.Rizal	Lakas
City Vice Mayor
Angelito S. Lazaro, Jr.	Lakas
City Councilors
Soliman B. Lajara	PFP
Joselito G. Catindig	Lakas
Leeanne P. Aldabe-Cortez	Lakas
Doreen May F. Cabrera-Silva	Lakas
Gerard Raymund R. Teruel	Lakas
Maria Kathrina V. Silva-Evangelista	Lakas
Christian Niño S. Lajara	Lakas
Pursino C. Oruga	Lakas
Arvin L. Manguiat	Lakas
Pio C. Dimapilis	Lakas
Moises E. Morales	Lakas
Juan Carlo C. Lazaro	Lakas
Ex Officio City Council Members
ABC President	Eduardo R. Silva (La Mesa)
SK President	Rally R. Bustria (Barangay 5)

=== List of former chief executives ===
Jose Rizal wrote a manuscript called Jefes del pueblo de Calamba (ang nangagsipagpuno sa bayan ng Calamba: sapol ng maging bayan, hangan sa panahon, 28 de Agosto, 1742 – hasta 1891) that is now kept in the National Library of the Philippines. It lists the names of local chief executives of Calamba since its founding as a town independent from Cabuyao. Their names were:

- Juan de la Cruz (1742–1743)
- Juan Macasadia (1743–1744)
- Marcos de los Santos (1744–1745)
- Santiago de Leon (1745–1746)
- Balthazar Hocson (1746–1747)
- Ygnacio Hilario (1747–1748)
- Andres de Ocampo (1748–1749)
- Domingo de los Santos (1749–1750)
- Melchor de los Reyes (1750–1751)
- Juan de la Cruz Punga (1751)
- Cristobal de Leon (1752)
- Francisco Kalangitan (1753)
- Pedro Blas (1754)
- Francisco Alipio (1755)
- Juan Ariliano (1756)
- Martin de los Santos (1757)
- Fernando de los Santos (1758)
- Apolinario de Ribera (1759; 1766; 1779–1780)
- Jose Acagada (1760)
- Luis Rufino (1761; 1763)
- Antonio Matangihan (1762)
- Mariano Alcantara (1764)
- Pedro Atanacio Bance (1765)
- Tomas de la Cruz (1767)
- Manuel de la Cruz (1768)
- Jose del Espiritu Santo (1769–1770)
- Mateo (Lis.), Melchor (Alv.), Alejo (Ale.), de Torres, Domingo Feliciano (Ale. Ll.) – (1770–1771)
- Baltazar Paseo (Pacio) – (1771–1772)
- José de Sta. Ana (Alv.) de Sta. María (Ale.) – (1772–1773)
- Pablo de S. José (1773–1774)
- Pedro Claudio (1774–1775)
- Juan Mariano Rufino (1775–1776)
- Salvador José Montero (Ale.) Monterey (Alv.) Alontereyes (Ll.) – (1776–1777)
- Mateo Marcos (1777–1778)
- Ygnacio de los Santos (1778–1779)
- Antonio Matangihan (1780–1781)
- Mateo Marcos (1781–1782)
- Santiago Rufino (1782–1783)
- Juan Francisco (1783–1784)
- José Diego (1784–1785)
- Pedro Pablo de San José (1785–1786)
- Antonio Villanueva (1786–1788)
- Baltazar Paseo (1787–1789)
- José de los Reyes (1788–1790)
- Vicente Feliz Cocson (1789–1791)
- Agustín Tolentino (1790–1792)
- Manuel de Santo Tomás (1791–1793)
- Agustín de la Cruz (1793–1794)
- Feliz de la Cruz (1794–1795)
- Feliciano Celisuerte (1795–1796)
- Ventura del Espíritu Santo (1796–1797)
- Manuel Jauregui (1797–1798)
- Alejandro Gatsalian (1798–1799)
- Eugenio de San Gabriel (1799–1800)
- Esteban de los Santos (1800–1801)
- Romualdo Roberto (1801–1802; 1809–1810)
- Leonardo Feliciano (1802–1803)
- Juan Rufino Manuel (1803–1804)
- Agustín Alejandro (1804–1805)
- Juan Aragón (1805–1806)
- Vicente Pabalan (1806–1807)
- Bernardino Antonio (1807–1808)
- Eugenio de San Gabriel (1808–1809)
- Juan Manuel Rufino (1810–1811)
- Policarpo Cuevas (1811–1812)
- Adriano Felix (1812–1813)
- Zacarias Sarmiento (1813–1814)
- Carlos de Leon (1814–1815)
- Leonardo Feliciano (1815–1816)
- Gaspar de los Reyes (1816–1817)
- Pedro Francisco (1817–1818)
- Francisco Eugenio (1818–1819)
- Ysidoro de la Cruz (1819–1820)
- Adriano Felix (1820–1821)
- Juan Ygnacio (1821–1822)
- Mariano Quintero and Juan Aragón (1822–1823)
- Santiago Eulalia and Florentino Ustaris (1823–1824)
- Atanasio Jauregui and Pedro Eugenio (1824–1825)
- Joseph Salgado (1825–1826)
- Mariano Quintero (1826–1827)
- Atanasio Jauregui (1827–1828;1831–1832)
- Pedro Francisco (1828–1829)
- Santiago Eulalia (1829–1830)
- Elias Ustaris (1830–1831)
- Juan de Villanueva (Alv.) (1832)
- Florentino Ustaris (1833; 1841)
- Juan Villanueva de Aragón (1834)
- Francisco de San Diego (1832–1834)
- Juan de los Angeles (1835; 1840; 1843; 1855)
- Ysidoro Villanueva (1836)
- Mariano Quintero (1837)
- Aniceto Julian (1838)
- Domingo Feliciano (1839)
- Crispín Gabino (1842)
- Ambrosio Pabalan (1844; 1858)
- Elias Ustaris (1845)
- Juan de Villanueva (1846)
- Paulino Quintero (1847;1852)
- Bruno de San Gabriel (1848)
- Juan Bernaldo (1849–1850)
- Tranquilino Gonzalez Hervosa (1851;1856)
- Gisberto Jauregui (1853)
- Juan Salgado (1854; 1857; 1863–1864)
- Francisco Elefaño (1859;1861; 1865–1866; 1875–1876)
- Estanislao Hervosa (1860)
- Juan Banatin (1862; 1867–1868)
- Gervasio Alviar (1869–1870; 1883)
- Calixto Llamas (1871)
- Andres Salgado (1872)
- Lucas Quintero (1873–1874; 1891)
- Francisco Salgado (1877–1878)
- Luis Elásegui (1879–1880)
- Matias Belarrnino (1881–1882)
- Lucas Quintero (1884)
- Luis Habaña (1885–1886)
- Nicolas Llamas (1887)
- Francisco Elefaño (1888)
- Eusebio Elefaño (1889)
- Matias Belarmino (1889–1890)

The following are the individuals that served as local chief executive of Calamba since the American occupation of the Philippines up to the present-day:

- Mateo Elejorde (1901–1904)
- Isidoro Cailles (1904–1907)
- Ramon Santos (1907–1910)
- Rafael Pabalan (1910–1917)
- Anastacio Rubio (1917–1919)
- Roman D. Lazaro (1919–1922; 1931–1934; 1938–1941; 1945–1946)
- Felipe Belarmino (1923–1925; 1926–1928; 1929–1931; 1941–1942)
- Eduardo A. Barretto (1935–1937)
- Enrique G. Shinyo (1942)
- Artemio M. Elepano (1942–1943)
- Sisenando V. Rizal Sr. (1943–1944; 1948–1951;1952–1954)
- Exequiel Geneciran (1944–1945)
- Severino Q. Arambulo (1946–1947; 1956–1959; 1967–1971)
- Pantaleon Alihan (1954–1955)
- Taciano V. Rizal (1960–1967; 1971–1975)
- Eduardo T. Yu Jr. (1975–1980)
- Salvador E. Delmo (1980–1986)
- Apolonio A. Elazegui (1986–1987)
- Victoriano Chipeco (1987–1988)
- Jesus Miguel Yulo (1988–1994)
- Severino J. Lajara (1994–2004)
- Joaquin M. Chipeco Jr. (2004–2013)
- Justin Marc S.B. Chipeco (2013–2022)
- Roseller H. Rizal (2022–present)

=== City seal ===
Official Calamba city seal

The seal of the City of Calamba has evolved and has been modified throughout the years. From being a municipality to a component city, a new seal was necessary to symbolize the new thrust of Calamba. In a citywide seal-making contest, Reyjon de Guzman emerged as winner, for his work best symbolized the ideals, pride and achievements of the city. Each color, shape, number and object has its own meaning relative to what is Calamba in the past, present and future.

- Shield shape – The shield shape in the center, with a slight circular bottom, flat top and curved edges at the top corners project solidity and congruence.
- Banga shaped twined with Dr. Jose Rizal's image – The historical ambience is depicted in this twin image. The abstract represents the influence of Dr. Jose Rizal and the Banga in the history of the City of Calamba.
- Numbers – the engraved "1742" mentions the year when Calamba was founded and seceded from the town of Cabuyao, while "2001" was identified as the year of Calamba's cityhood.
- Objects – the mountain in the background and the water current at the bottom part relate to land and water resources of the city pertain to the vast natural resources of Mount Makiling and the aquatic benefits of Laguna de Bay. The water beneath Mt. Makiling shows that Calamba touches a body of water notably Laguna de Bay, the largest lake in the country, and that's why Calamba is also known as the "City by the Lake". The silhouette image of rice field on the left and the industrial buildings on the right symbolizing Calamba's rapid modernization, urbanization, and industrialization. With both signs located beside each other, it shows everyone that nature and progress can efficiently coexist in Calamba.
- Colors – Except for silver grey and metallic gold, all others are similar to the national seal. However, additional meanings are attached to each.
- Metallic gold – This represents the radiating image of Dr. Jose Rizal and Banga that reflects in the minds and deeds of Calambeños.
- Red – This symbolizes the burning patriotism of residents as exemplified by Rizal.
- Blue – As land and water represent wealth and prosperity, the color blue signifies productivity and tranquility of the constituents.
- Silver grey – This represents the transformation of development from an agricultural pueblo in the 1700s to an agro-industrial town in the 1900s and finally to an industrial city.
- White – This projects purity, transparency, efficiency and prudence pertaining to governance.
- Calamba has a golden edge etched at the upper half with the words Lungsod ng Calamba depicting Calamba as a Philippine component city. Laguna at the bottom part means that Calamba is still part of Laguna province.

== Tourism ==
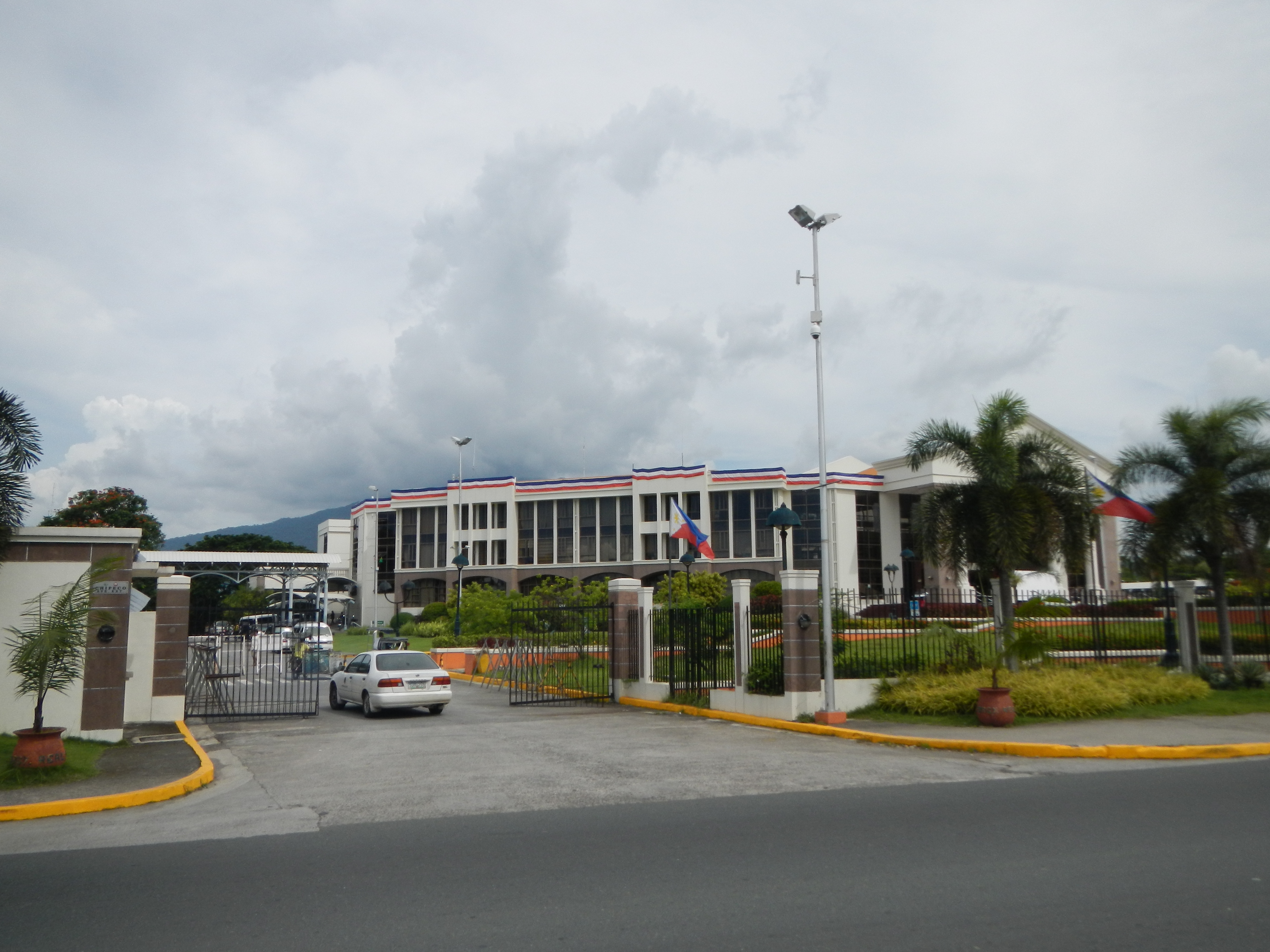
Calamba City Hall

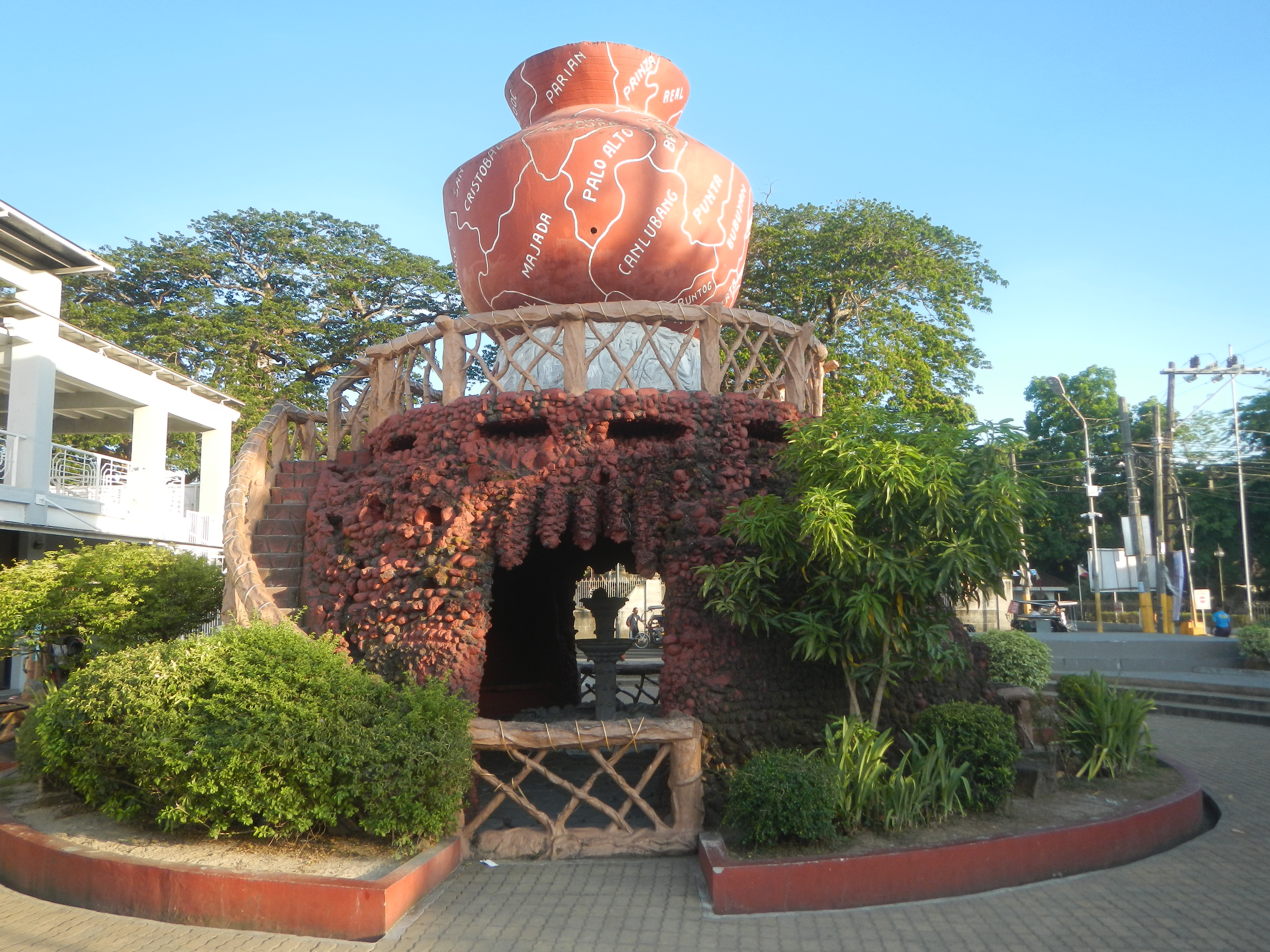
Calamba Claypot

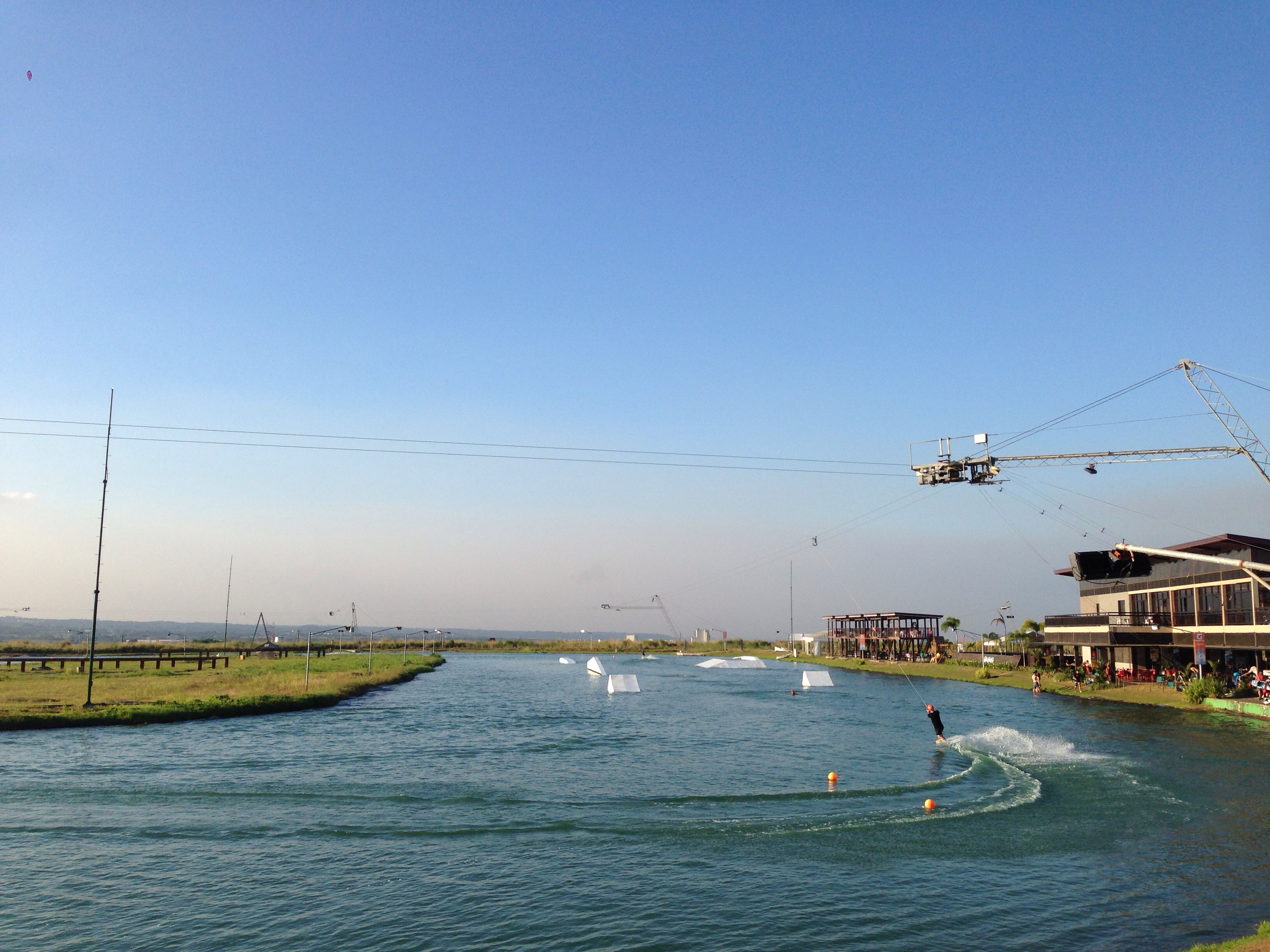
Republic Wakepark Canlubang

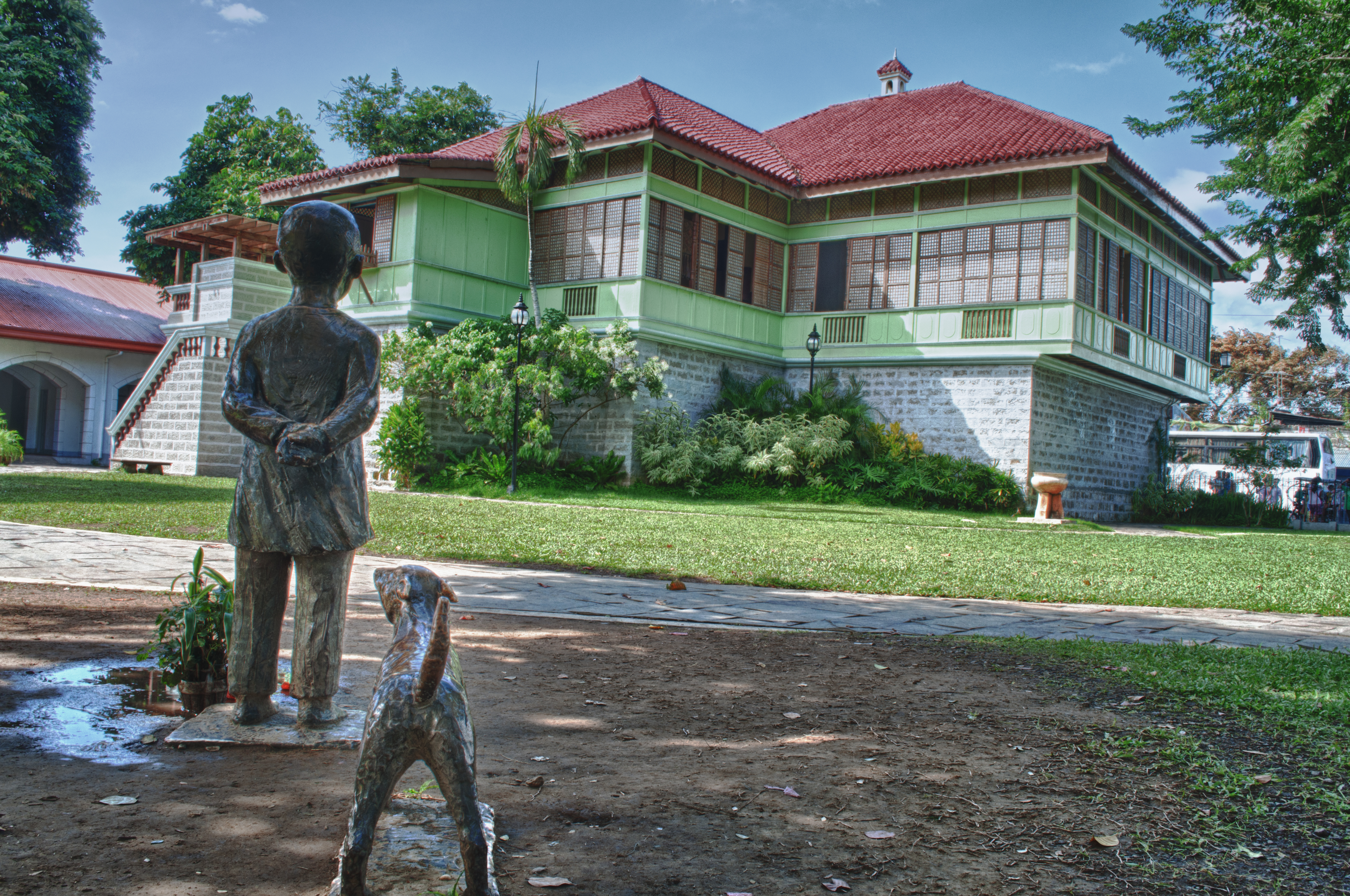
Rizal Shrine

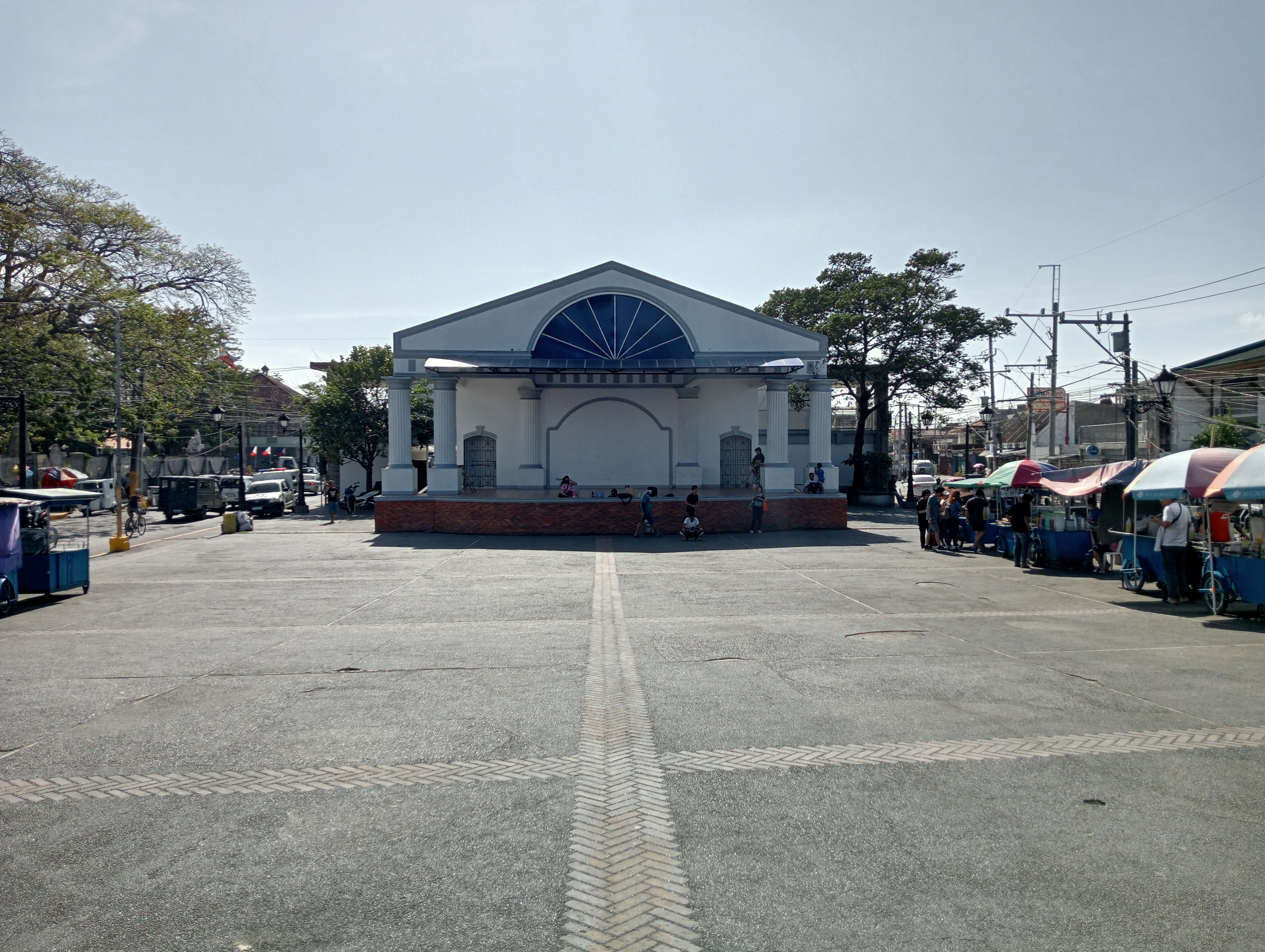
Calamba City Plaza

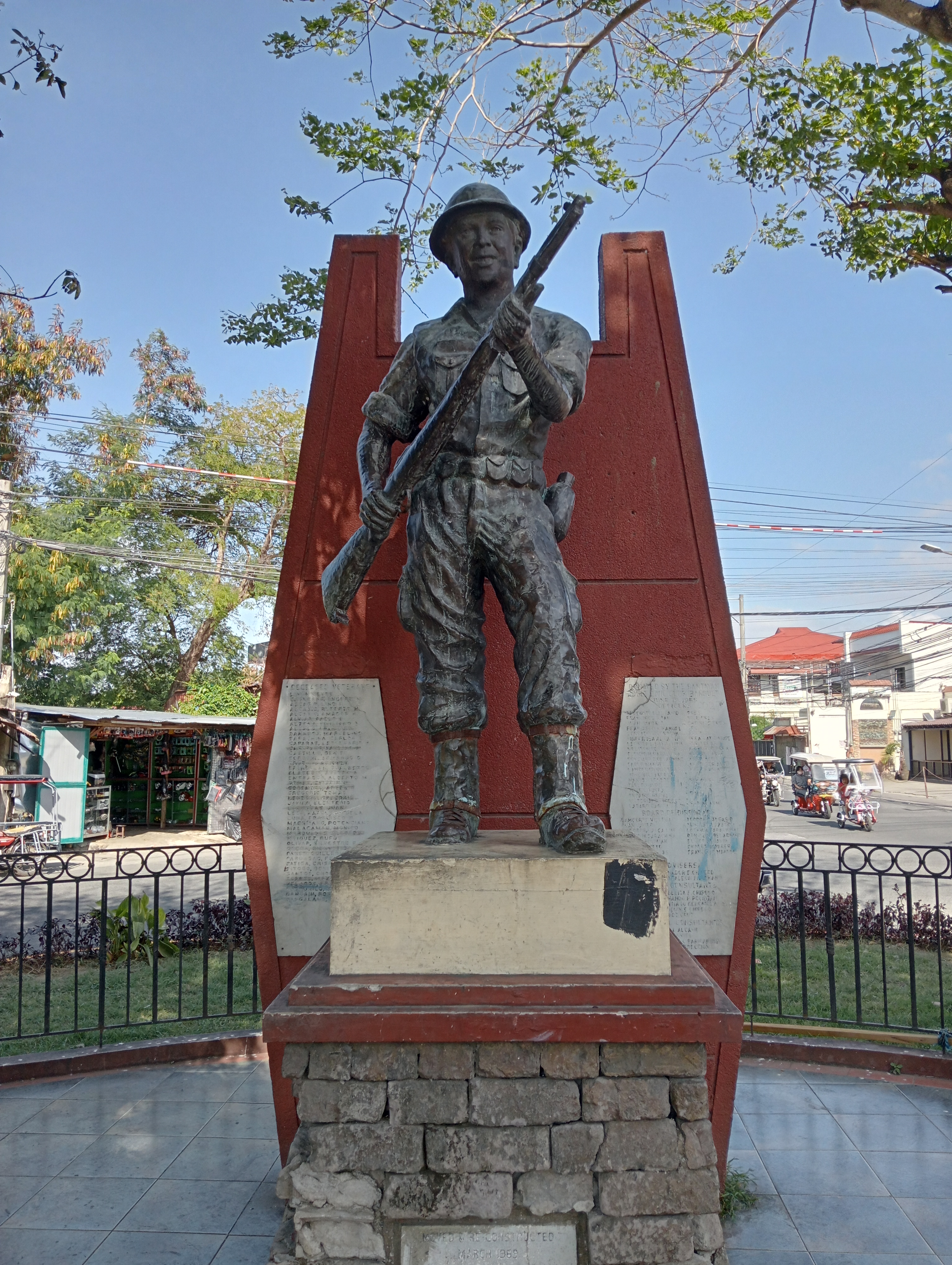
Calamba Veteran's Monument

Calamba is the location of José Rizal's birthplace, Rizal Shrine, found in the poblacion (city proper), and St. John the Baptist Parish Church, the location of Rizal's baptism. A park built to commemorate José Rizal, Rizal Park (or the Plaza) hosts a 22 feet (6.7 m) tall statue of Rizal, with the number symbolizing the 22 languages and dialects used by Rizal. The statue sits on top of a 15-step podium, symbolizing one decade since Rizal was born. The monument was once cited as the tallest Jose Rizal Monument in the world, until a monument of Rizal was built in Santa Cruz, Laguna, for the Palarong Pambansa 2014. The monument was inaugurated by President Benigno Aquino III in preparation for the Jose Rizal's sesquicentennial birth anniversary on June 19, 2011.

Other tourist attractions include the Calamba Claypot (Banga or Calambanga), a large pot that is the namesake of the city, Republic Wakepark, a water sports park in the Nuvali mixed-use residential development in Canlubang, and Calamba Island, an islet off Laguna de Bay.

Being near to Mount Makiling, Calamba also hosts hot spring resorts, concentrated at barangays Pansol, Bucal and Bagong Kalsada near the boundary with Los Baños.

== Culture ==
=== Festivals ===
The Buhayani Festival, the official festival of the City of Calamba was the brainchild of Mayor Justin Marc SB. Chipeco during his first year as Mayor in 2013. Mayor Timmy wanted the city to have a festival that will best characterize its culture, progress and tourism potential. He wanted to capitalize on the city's historical heritage as the birthplace of unofficial Philippine National Hero, Dr. Jose P. Rizal. Thus, the Buhayani Festival was born.

The term "Buhayani" was coined by joining two Filipino words, "buhay" meaning life or the state of being alive and lively and "bayani" or hero. The festival's tagline "Buhay ng Bayani, Buháy na Bayani" literally translates to "Life of the Hero"pertaining to the life of our famous kababayan, Dr. Jose Rizal and "Living Hero"which refers to the common man who has the capacity and potential to become everyday heroes in their own small ways.

"We want everyone who revere our kababayan, Dr. Jose Rizal to come to Calamba and join us in honouring him on his birthday and in celebrating the modern Rizal in us. We want to make our National Hero modern and relevant in today's challenging times and we want to celebrate the spirit of heroism that lives in each Filipino, not just in us Calambeños," Mayor Chipeco was quoted saying.

Different activities were lined up for this year's Buhayani Festival: Kuwentong Bayani for selected Grade 5 students, Talinong Rizal Quiz Bee, Buhayani Football Cup, Independence Day Job Fair, SayawIndak Street Dancing Competition, Marching Band Competition, Baile de Gala, Hawig Rizal (Rizal Look-a-Like), Buhayani Eye Care Mission, and a whole lot more. Highlighting this year's celebration is the Morning Program wherein Philippine National Police Chief, Director General Ronald "Bato" Dela Rosa is the Guest of Honor and Speaker. A special wreath-laying ceremony shall also commence at the Museo ni Rizal sa Calamba after a simultaneous floral offering at five different Rizal monuments around the city.

"Jose Rizal is not just the pride of Calamba, he is the pride of the entire country as he was the Greatest Malay to have lived. His works, teachings and ideals have inspired and will continue to inspire us as we strive to live up to his ideals of nationalism and love of country. In the Buhayani Festival, we celebrate an ideal and an advocacy that through this festival, we can rekindle the fire of patriotism and heroism in the hearts of every Filipino. Come to Calamba – retrace history's footsteps, rediscover the richness and uniqueness of our heritage, fire up our Filipino pride and be inspired to share and spread what you have experienced and be part of the force that will bring about a renewed love of country in every Filipino," Mayor Chipeco challenged.

== Education ==
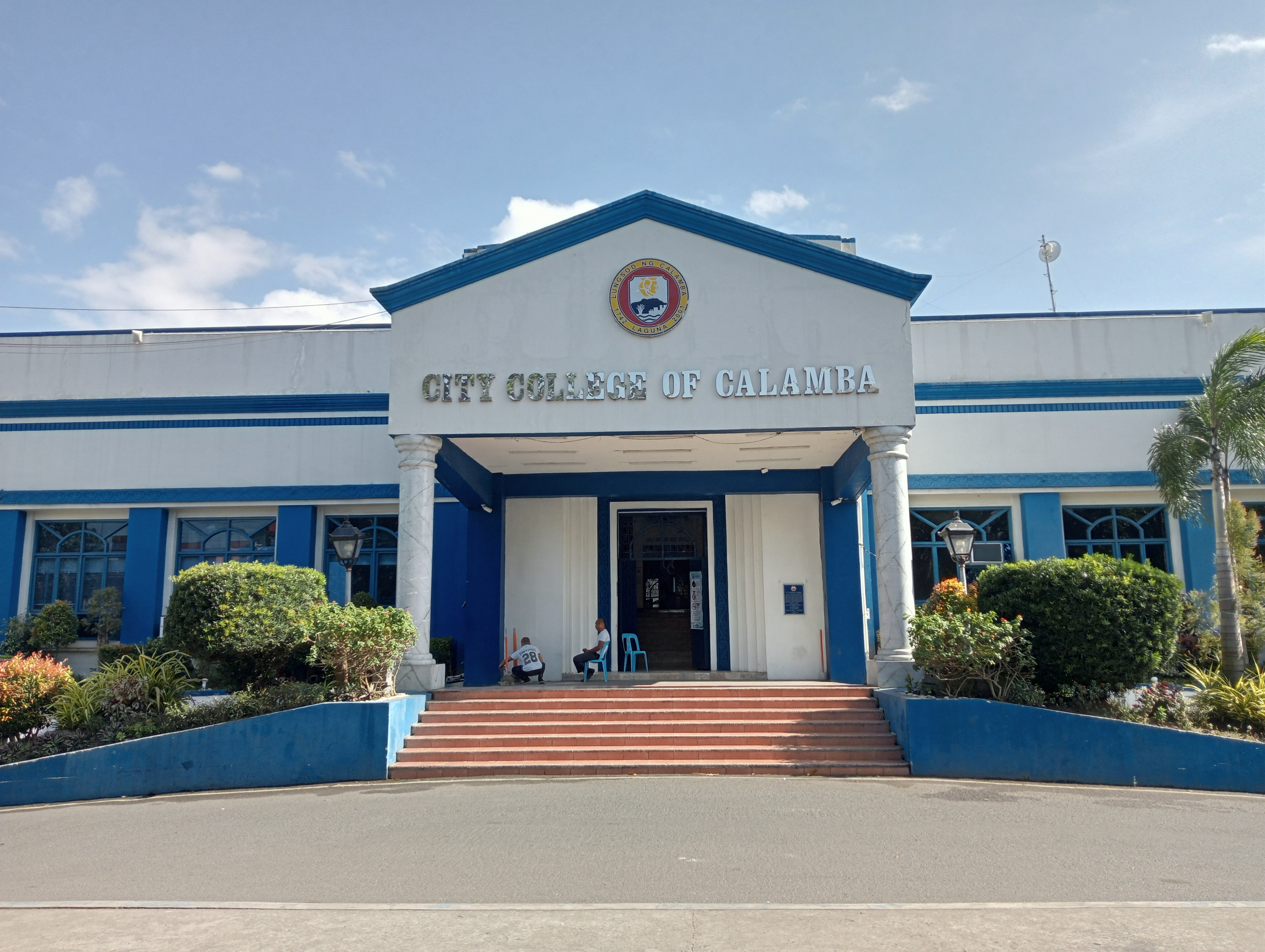
City College of Calamba

Calamba has a literacy rate of 98.9%. As of 2007, there are 120 elementary schools, 51 of which are public and 69 private. There are 50 secondary schools, 16 public and 34 private. Post-secondary education include 17 universities and colleges, and 9 technical and vocational schools.

The city has four NCAA affiliate schools that set up branches in the city, namely as the Colegio de San Juan de Letran (Calamba Campus), Lyceum of the Philippines University (Laguna Campus), San Sebastian College – Recoletos (Canlubang Campus) and University of Perpetual Help System DALTA (Calamba Campus).

Some private schools that are also located in Calamba are Don Bosco College, Canlubang, Calamba Institute, Laguna College of Business and Arts, Saint Benilde International School, Asian Computer College, Inc., Asian Institute of Computer Studies, Inc. Active Community Contributor Calamba Churchitute, Inc., NU Laguna & INSPIRE Sports Academy, Philippine Women's University, Saint John Colleges, Maranatha Christian Academy. In Nuvali Calamba, there are two other schools located which are the Miriam College and Xavier School. In the near future, Everest Academy, a renowned Catholic and international school opened its second campus in Nuvali.

The City College of Calamba is the only public college in the city.

== Notable personalities ==
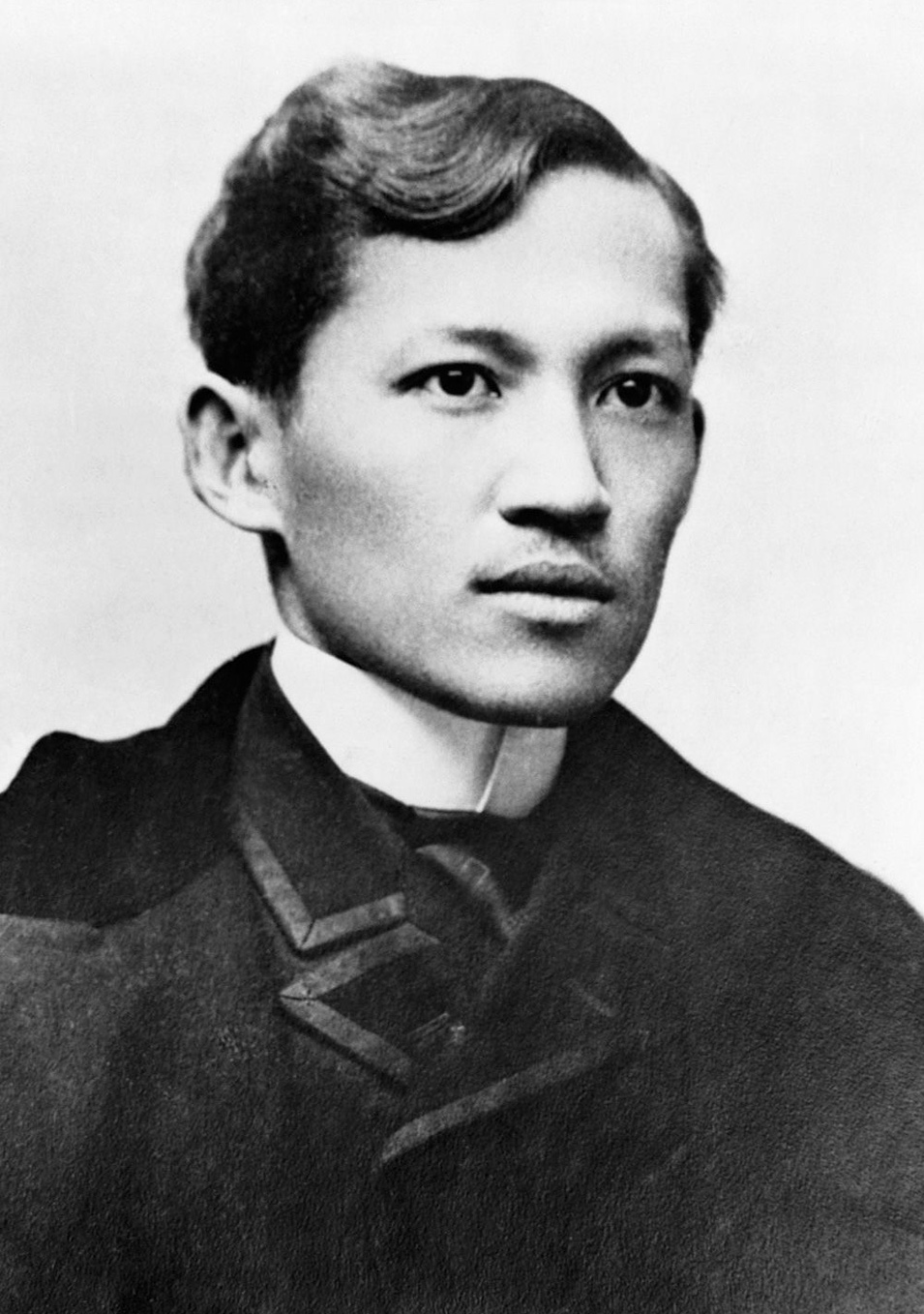
Dr. Jose Rizal

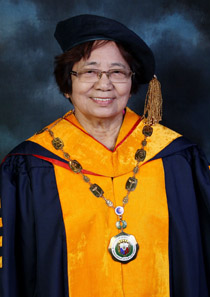
National Scientist Dolores Ramirez

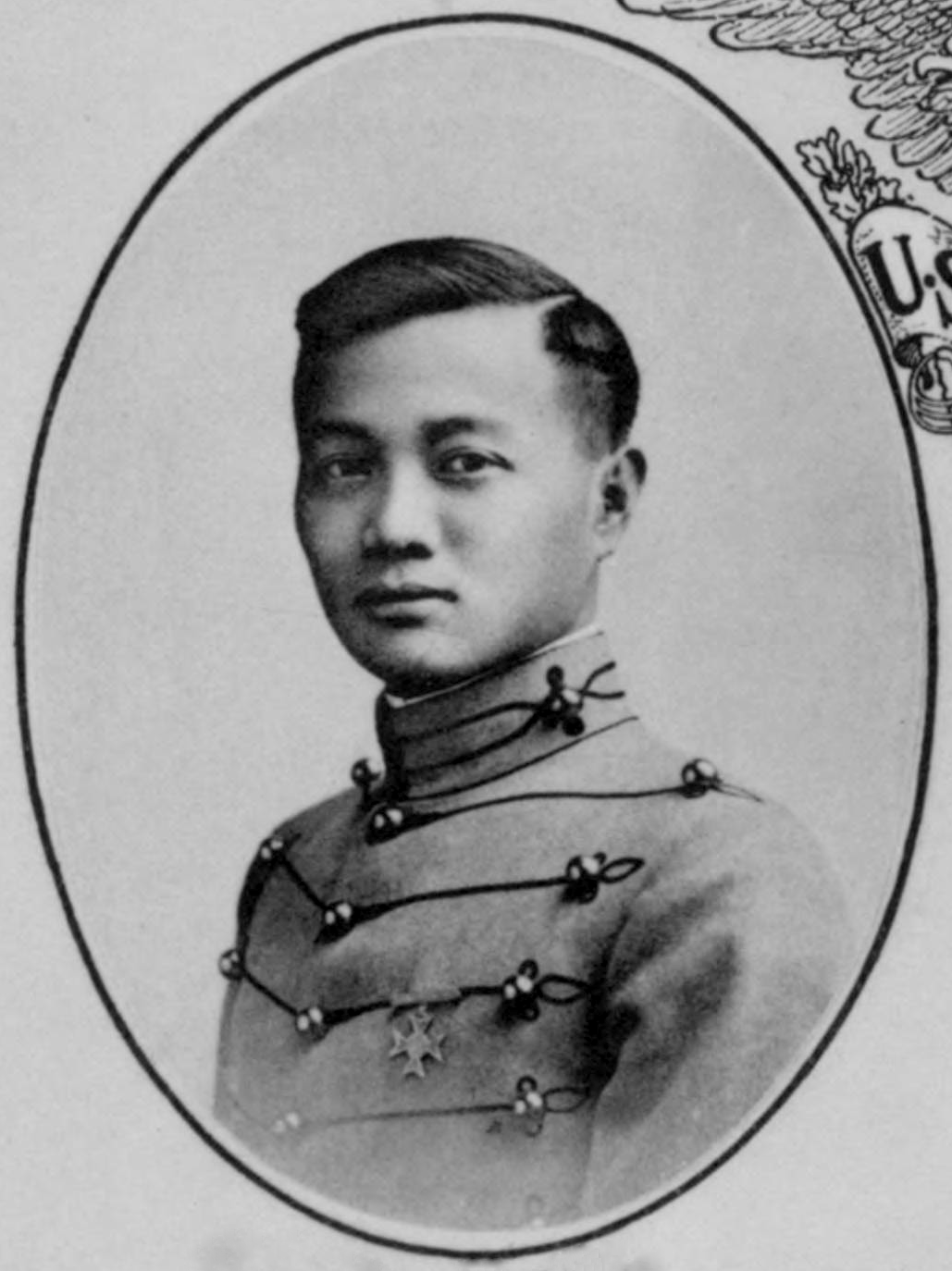
Vicente Lim

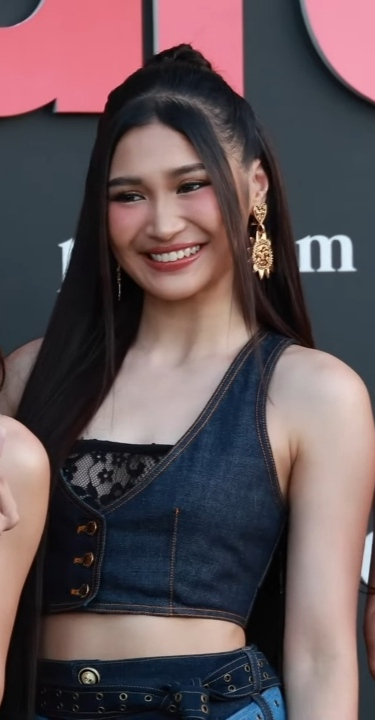
Jhoanna Robles

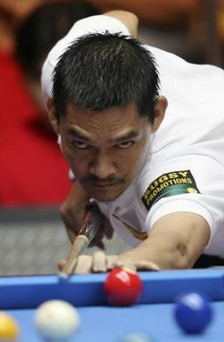
Ronato "Ronnie" Alcano
- José Rizal – Philippine national hero, nationalist and reformist
- Paciano Rizal – revolutionary general, and the older brother of José Rizal
- Trinidad Rizal – feminist leader and co-founder of the Philippines' first feminist organization, the Asociacion Femenista Filipina.
- Delfina Herbosa de Natividad – one of the three women, together with Marcela Agoncillo and her daughter Lorenza, who seamed together the Flag of the Philippines. Niece of José Rizal.
- Vicente Lim – World War II Brigadier General
- Florencio Pesquesa – farm worker and labor leader during the Martial law era that was abducted and disappeared. His name is inscribed in the Bantayog ng mga Bayani
- Leopoldo B. Uichanco – Second Filipino Dean of UP College of Agriculture, Father of Philippine Entomology
- Dolores Ramirez – National Scientist of the Philippines for Biochemical Genetics & Cytogenetics
- Bienvenido O. Juliano – National Scientist of the Philippines for Biochemistry
- Jose Juliano – nuclear physicist and chemist
- José Yulo – 5th Speaker of the Philippine House of Representatives, 6th Chief Justice of the Supreme Court of the Philippines, former senator, 13th and 35th Secretary of the Department of Justice
- Ruth Mariano-Hernandez – former member of the House of Representatives from Laguna's 2nd district
- Dominador E. Chipeco, Sr. – 12th Governor of Laguna
- Restituto L. Luna – 14th Governor of Laguna
- Teresita S. Lazaro – 16th Governor of Laguna
- Ramil L. Hernandez – 18th Governor of Laguna and incumbent member of the House of Representatives from Laguna's 2nd district
- Ronato Alcano – professional pool player
- Maybelline Masuda – Brazilian Jiu-Jitsu practitioner
- John Vic De Guzman – volleyball player and actor
- Jerrold Tarog – film director and screenwriter
- Palito – comedian and actor
- Teody Belarmino – film actor
- Aruray – actress and comedian
- Menggie Cobarrubias – film and television actor
- Lester Avan Andrada – Film actor
- Thea Tolentino – actress, Protégé: The Battle for the Big Artista Break winner
- Jeric Gonzales – actor, Protégé: The Battle for the Big Artista Break winner
- Sam Mangubat – singer, 2nd placer of Tawag ng Tanghalan
- Jhoanna Robles – member of Pinoy pop group Bini

== Sister cities ==
=== Local ===
- Bacoor, Cavite
- Biñan, Laguna
- Cabanatuan
- Cabuyao, Laguna
- Imus, Cavite
- Mabalacat, Pampanga
- Mabitac, Laguna
- Naga, Camarines Sur
- Ozamiz, Misamis Occidental

=== International ===
- Geumcheon (Seoul), South Korea
- Guri, South Korea
- Jinjiang, China
- Litoměřice, Czech Republic
- Walnut, United States
- Wilhelmsfeld, Germany

== See also ==
- Turbina, Calamba
- Real, Calamba
