= Saint James the Apostle Parish Church (Paete) =

Roman Catholic church in Laguna, Philippines

Paete Church
- Saint James the Apostle Parish Church
- San Santiago Apostol Parish Church
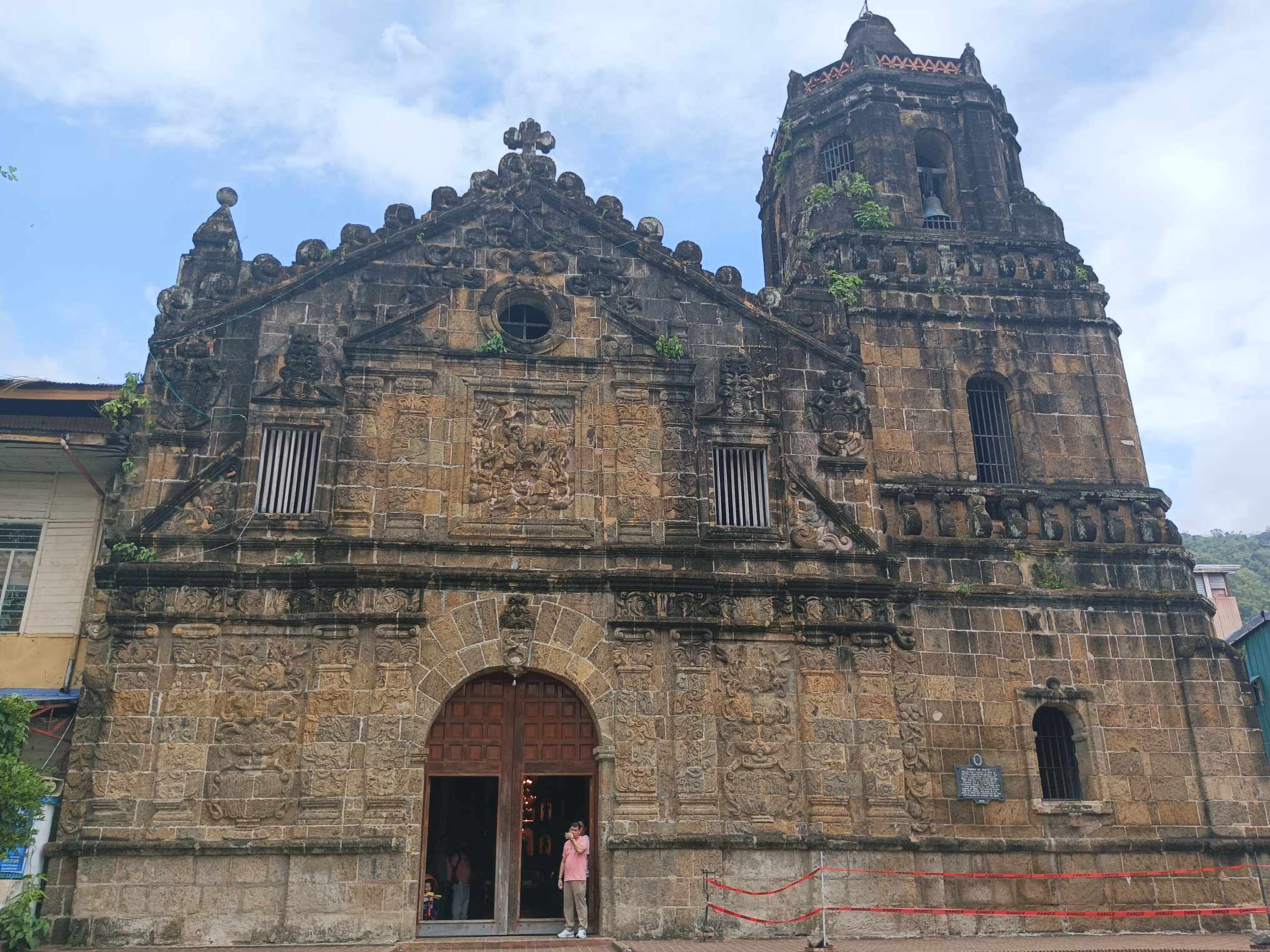
- Church facade, circa 2024

- Location in Laguna Luzon Location in the Philippines
- 14°21′52″N 121°28′54″E
- Location: Paete, Laguna
- Country: Philippines
- Denomination: Roman Catholic
- Website: dioceseofsanpablo.net

History
- Former name: Pueblo de San Lorenzo Diacono
- Status: Parish church
- Founded: 1580
- Founder(s): Juan de Plasencia and Diego de Oropesa
- Dedication: Saint James the Greater

Architecture
- Functional status: Active
- Heritage designation: National Historical Landmark
- Architectural type: Church building
- Style: Baroque Mission
- Groundbreaking: 1864

Specifications
- Length: 42 m (138 ft)
- Width: 7 m (23 ft)
- Height: 14 m (46 ft)
- Materials: Volcanic tuff, egg white and other native material

Administration
- Province: Manila
- Metropolis: Manila
- Archdiocese: Manila
- Diocese: San Pablo
- Deanery: St. James

Clergy
- Archbishop: Jose Advincula
- Bishop: Marcelino Antonio Maralit Jr.
- Priest: Rex Maharlika P. delos Angeles

Saint James the Apostle Parish Church, commonly known as the Church of Paete, is the only Roman Catholic church in Paete, Laguna, Philippines. Its patron saint is James the Apostle and his feast is celebrated every July 25. It is under the jurisdiction of the Diocese of San Pablo. The church is known for its huge and exquisite collection of images depicting the Passion of Christ, its century-old paintings and wooden images of saints (or poon).

== History ==
Paete was established as town in 1580 by Franciscan priest Fray Juan Plasencia under the patronage of Saint Lawrence. Due to the scarcity of religious men, it was annexed to the visita of Lumban until October 20, 1600, and to Pangil until 1602. The first parish priest of Paete, Fray Pedro de Buenaventura, was appointed in 1602. The first stone church and convent were built by Paete natives under the supervision of Fray Andres de Puertellanoin 1646 but it was later destroyed by an earthquake in 1717. A new stone church was started the same year under Fray Francisco de la Fuente. It was completed in 1840 under the term of Fray Luis de Nambroca. The church and convent were again destroyed by the 1880 Luzon earthquake. Father Gregorio Martin built a temporary small church of 33 m (108 ft) by 13.2 m (43 ft) by 8.6 m (28 ft). In 1884, the church was rebuilt under Father Pedro Galiano, now facing the Laguna de Bay but this was again destroyed by another earthquake on August 20, 1937. The church served as a dungeon and torture house to the people of Paete during the Japanese occupation of the Philippines in World War II.

== Features ==
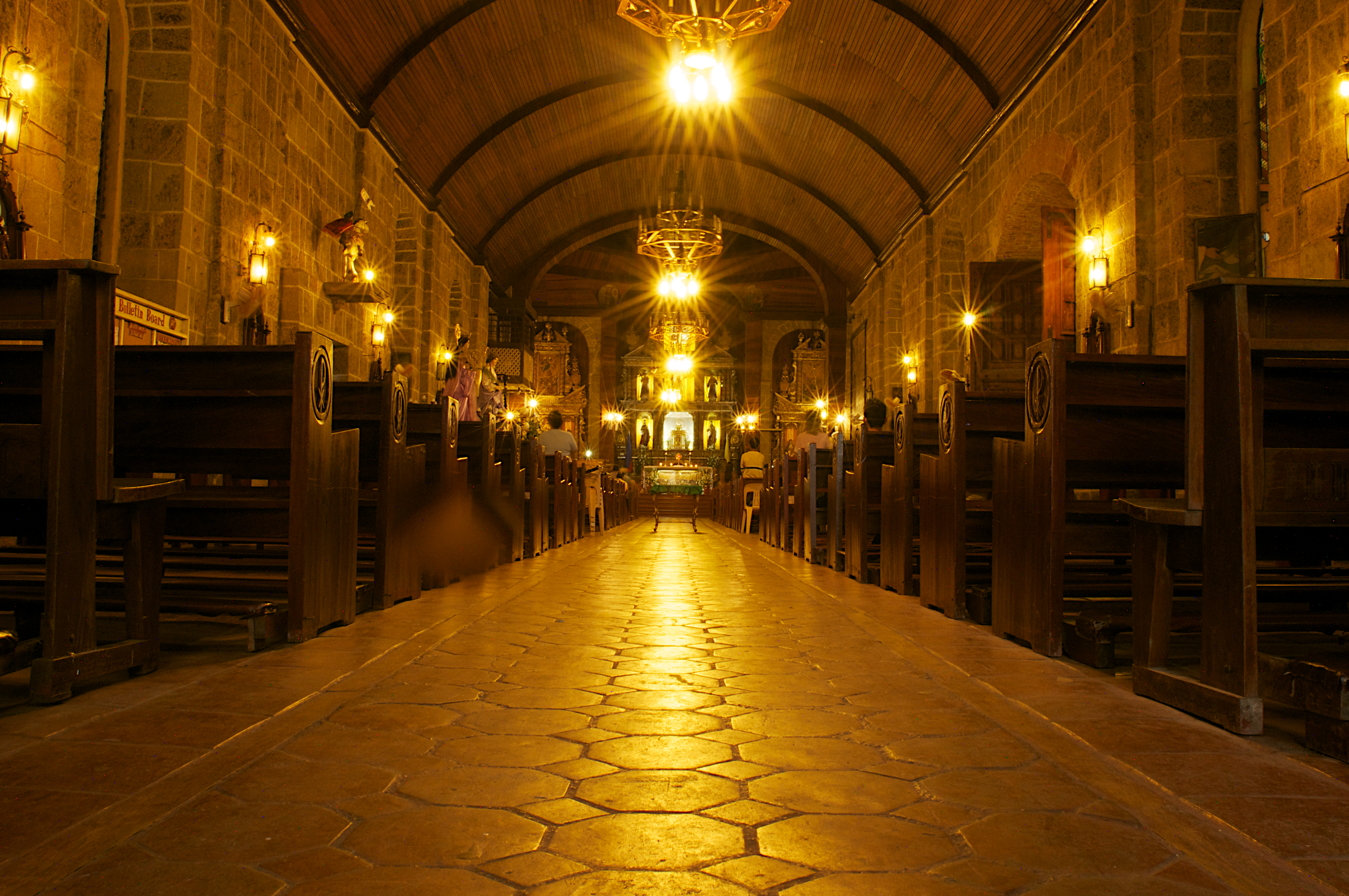
Church interior in 2010

The church is 42 m (138 ft) long by 7 m (23 ft) thick by 42 m (138 ft) wide. The church underwent a lot of renovation due to natural calamities. With a long history of losing the church building to earthquakes, the current baroque mission church has large buttresses on each side to improve its earthquake resistance. It was made of volcanic tuff bricks. The church has an elaborate baroque style with a fusion of oriental artistry.

=== Façade ===
The church's facade is divided by a frieze that continues around the adjoining bell tower. It has bas reliefs of leaves and flowers and a sculpted image of St. James depicted as a Santiago Matamoros (Saint James the Moor-slayer) in a central niche of the upper story. The relief of Saint James is no longer the original image. The present relief which replaced the original one was installed in 1804. The triangular stepped pediment has a circular aperture directly above the image of St. James. Several arched windows decorate the bell tower.

=== Altar ===
The main retablo of the church is of three storeys, flanked by two side retablos, both of two storeys. Two more side retablos can be seen in the north and south transept. The intricate retablo pieces were made by Paete natives; among them were Bartolome Palatino and Francisco Macahumpan.

The uppermost niche of the main altar features the crucified Christ, the center niche (from left to right) contains images of St. Pedro Bautista, St. James and St. John Capistrano. The bottommost level contains Saints Peter and Paul, with the tabernacle in the middle. In front of this main altar is an altar table added under the auspices of Vatican II.

On the north transept are two altars, the one closest to the main altar contains a bas relief of the Assumption of St. Mary at the top, with statues of the St. Barbara, the Del Carmen and St. Lucy. The other side altar contains the image of the Virgen delos Dolores and the Santo Entierro.

On the south transept are two more altars, the one closest to the main altar contains a bas relief of the Pentecost at the top, with statues of St. Rose de Lima, St. Joseph and St. Anthony de Padua at the bottom. The other side altar contains the crucified Christ at the top and the Pietà at the bottom.

Across the Juicio Final mural is reliquary containing two silver medals and a rock from St. James tomb given by the Archbishop of Santiago de Compostela in Spain.

=== Murals ===
The large wall paintings on wood panels inside the church were executed by another notable son of Paete, Luciano Dans. These depict Langit, Lupa, Impiyerno – Heaven, Earth, Hell – and large murals of Saint Christopher. Dans used natural color pigments mixed with volcanic ash and brushes made from cats' hair to create the murals. The large painting of San Cristobal on wood was purchased during the time of Father Francisco de Santa Gonzaleza for ₱22 in October 1852. The two St. Christopher paintings have since deteriorated; a lot of wood panels inside the church, including the painted wood panels, are infested by termites.

Another mural created by an unknown artist and the oldest among all murals inside the church is the Last Judgment or Juicio Final painted around 1720. It is located near the church altar.

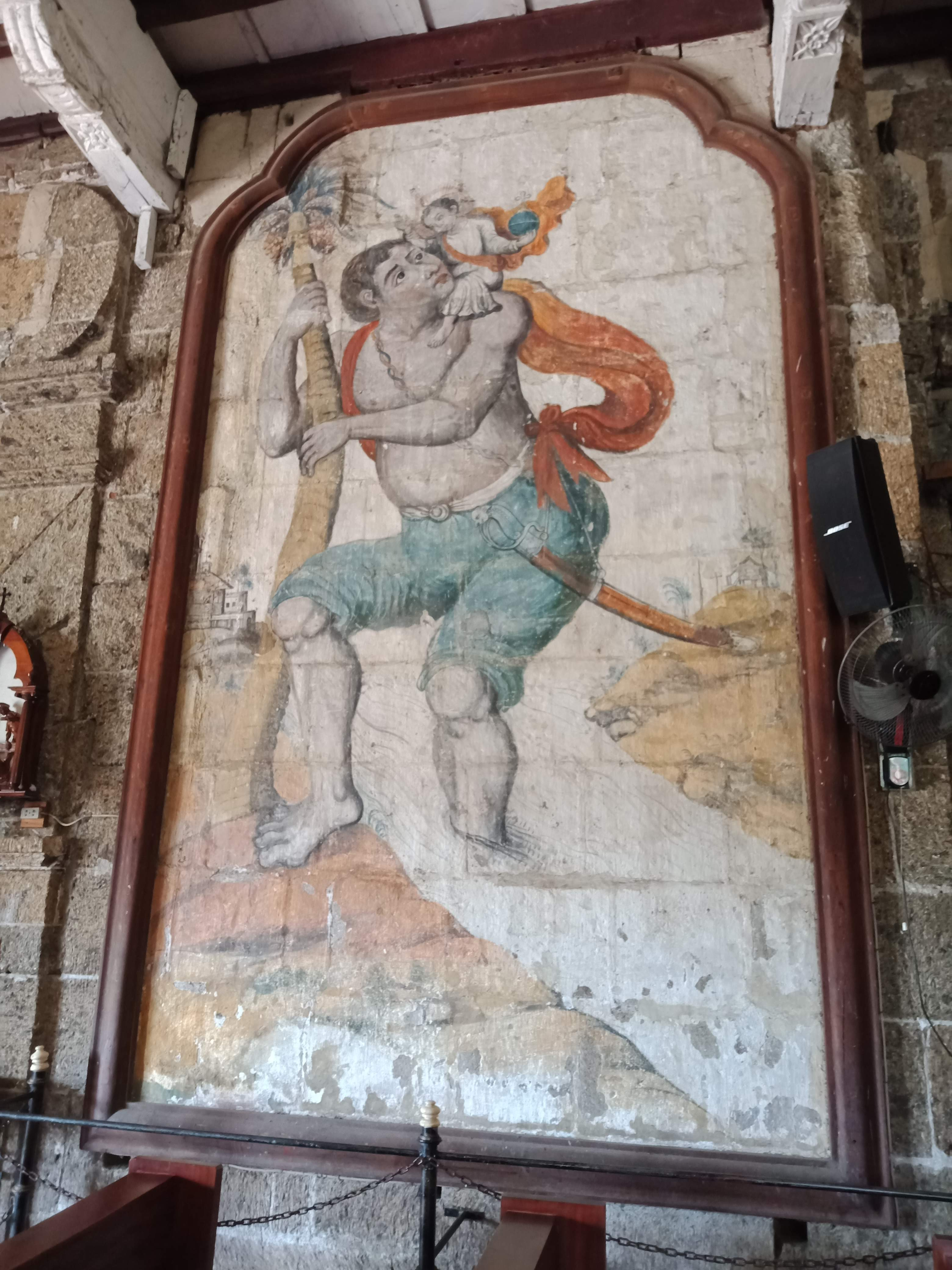
San Cristobal "I" - the "Indio" form painting on the actual wall

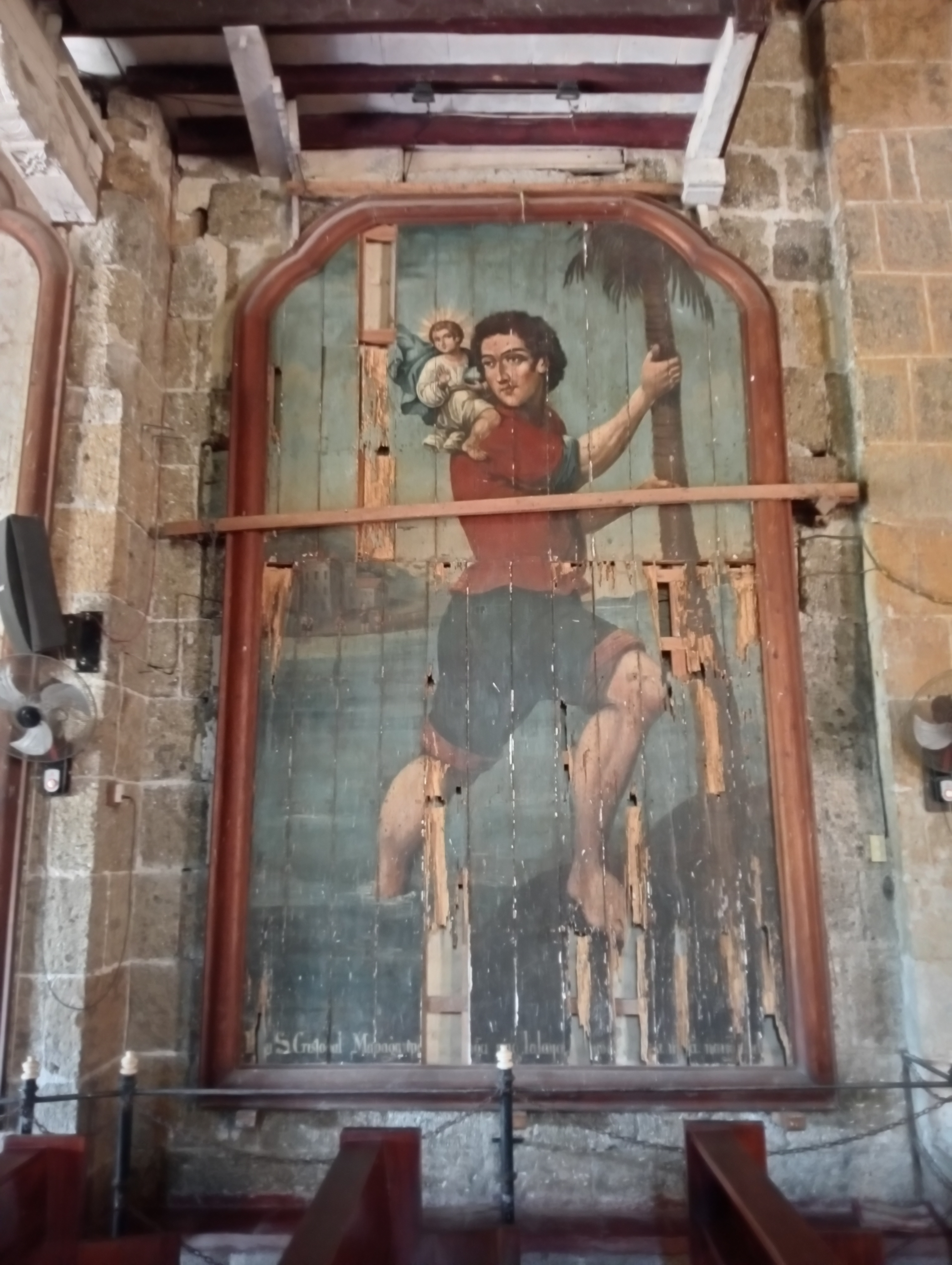
San Cristobal "II"- the "European" form painting which used to cover the San Cristobal "I"

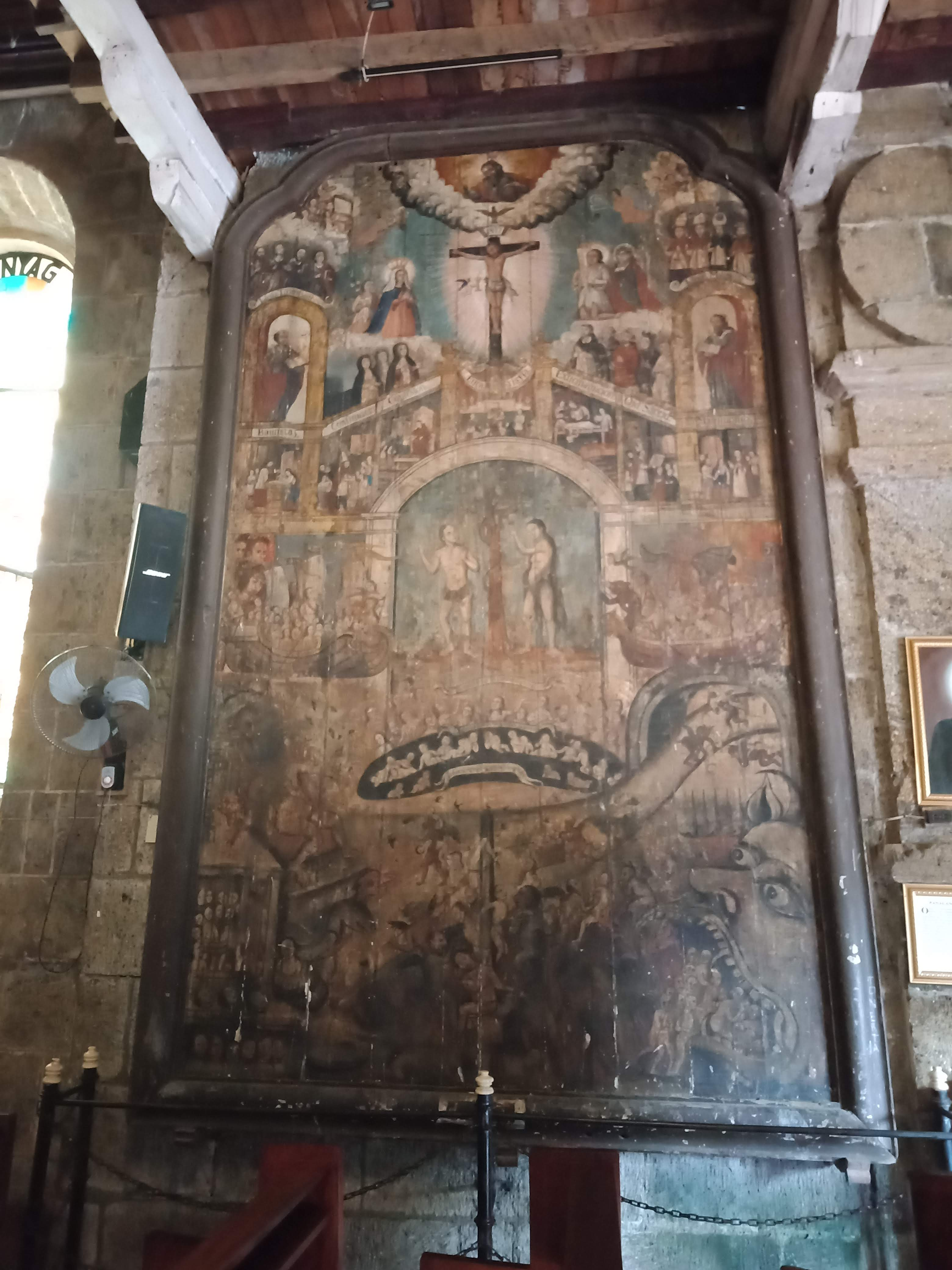
Langit, Lupa and Impierno by Josef Luciano Dans

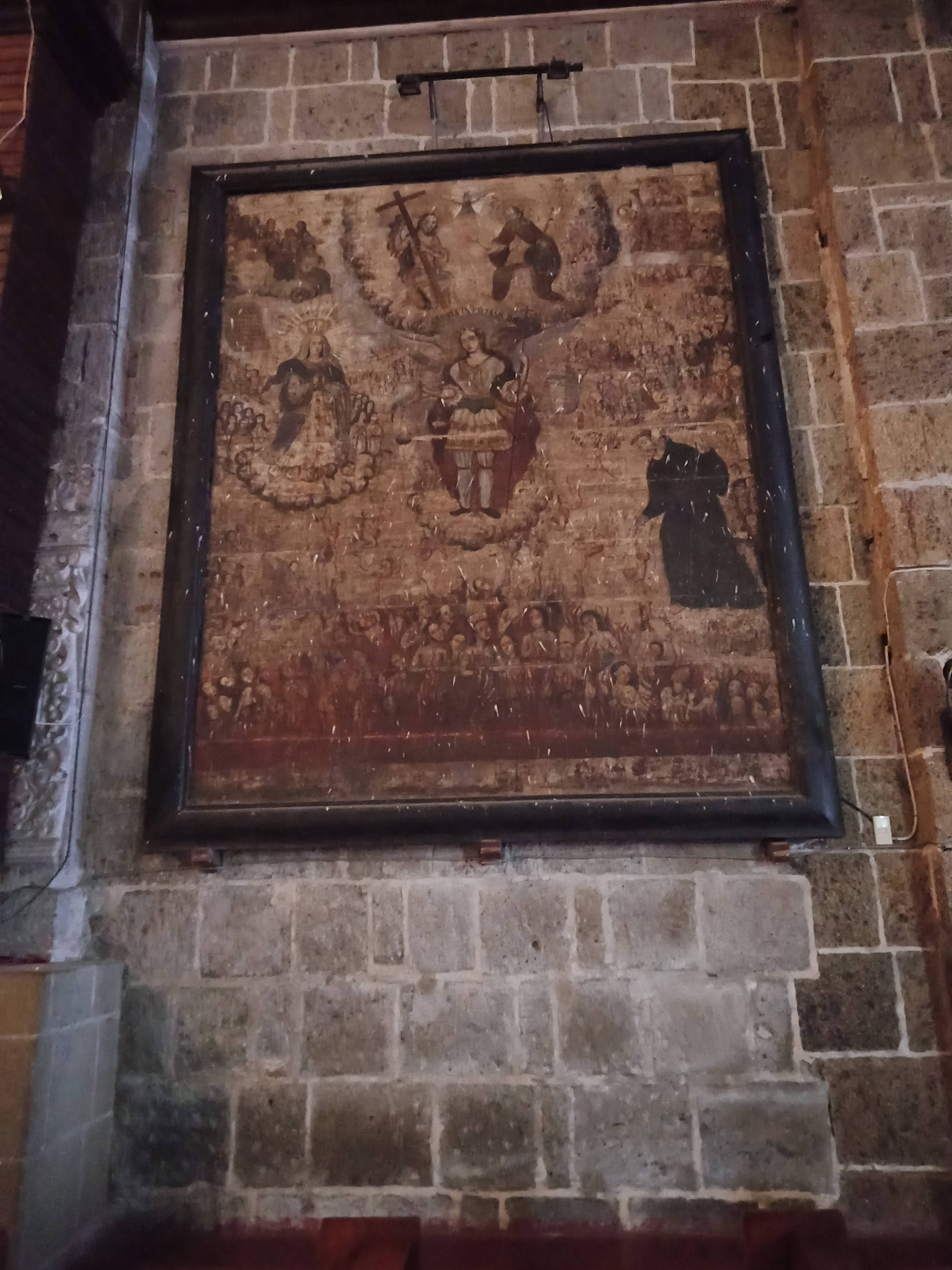
Juicio Final- a painting of the Last Judgement

== Church traditions ==
=== Lenten and Holy Week traditions ===
At the start of the Lenten season, owners of privately owned religious images that were handed down from generations put up an exhibit of their religious icons on the church's hall. The exhibit has one of the largest collection of images depicting the passion of Christ. The exhibit usually ran from Ash Wednesday up to Holy Monday. On Holy Tuesday, a procession of miniature poon carried by children along the church patio takes place. From Holy Wednesday up to Good Friday, locals processed their religious images around the town.

The most famous poon during the Holy Week celebration is Mariano Cagahastian Madriñan's replica of his own work of Mater Dolorosa. Madriñan, Paete's hero received a diploma of award and the King Alfonso XII of Spain Medal of Honor for his Mater Dolorosa work in 1882 which was exhibited at the International Exposition held in Amsterdam. The image of the Mother of Sorrows was known for its movable parts with excellent articulation. During procession, the image could be made to embrace the statue of Christ carrying His cross, look up to gaze at St. Veronica's veil and bless her with the sign of the cross. The image of St. Veronica could also move its hand to show the veil imprinted with Christ's face.

=== Salibanda ===
The celebration of Salibanda is celebrated every third week of January. It marks the end of the Christmas season in Paete and the feast of the Infant Jesus (or Santo Niño). It starts with a fluvial parade along with an image of Santo Niño and followed by a dance procession to the church.

=== Feast of San Antonio Abad ===
The feast of San Antonio Abad, Paete's secondary patron is celebrated every January 17. A small stone chapel or ermita dedicated to the Saint Anthony is located near the main church.

== Declarations ==
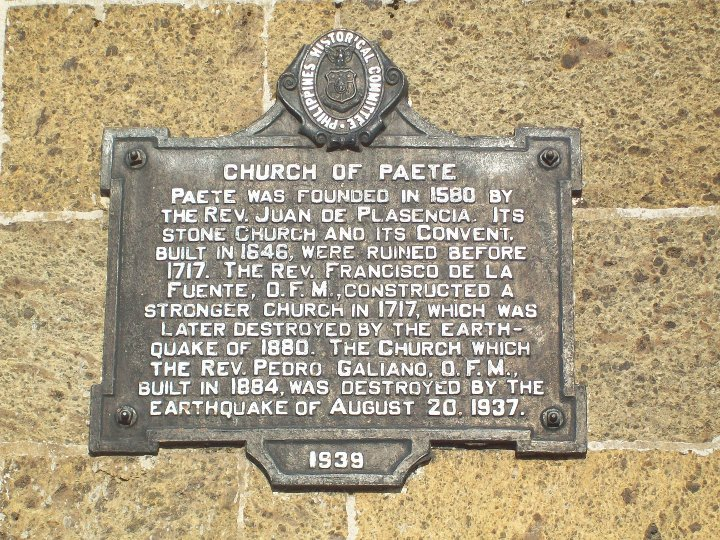
Church PHC historical marker installed in 1939

In 1939, the National Historical Institute (now National Historical Commission of the Philippines), installed a historical marker for the church. It is also a National Historical Landmark.

In 2015, the National Museum declared the Sacred Art of the Parish Church of Santiago Apostol in Paete, Laguna (four paintings in situ) as a National Cultural Treasure.

== Damage and Conservation ==
In 1981, the National Historical Commission of the Philippines restored the church, among which was the addition of a concrete dome in its belfry.

In December 2019, Typhoon Ursula flooded the church.

On July 24, 2021, a 6.6-magnitude earthquake in Calatagan, Batangas caused damage to the church, where visible cracks were seen. In September of the same year, Typhoon Jolina damaged the church's roof.

== Bibliography ==
- Huerta, Felix de (1865). Estado geográfico, topográfico, estadístico, histórico religioso. Binondo: Imprenta de M. Sanchez y Ca.
- Historical Markers: Regions I–IV and CAR. Manila: National Historical Institute (Philippines). 1993. p. 85. ISBN 9715380611.
- Jose, Regalado Trota Jr. (1987). "The Church of Paete in 1807: Ecclesiastical Decorations and Furnishings". Philippine Studies. 35 (1): 93–102.(subscription required)
