= Paete =

Municipality in Laguna, Philippines

- Municipality
- Municipality of Paete
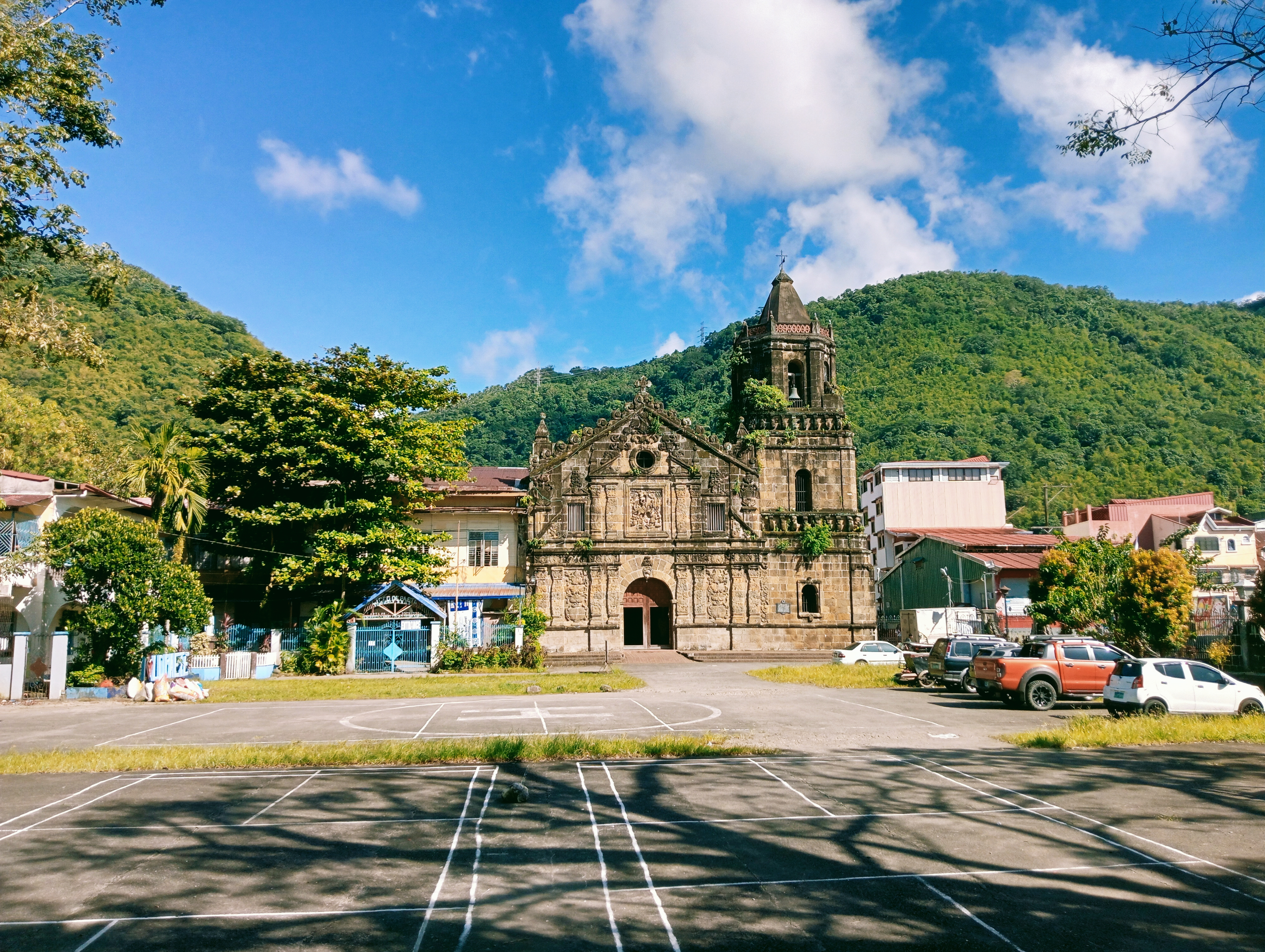
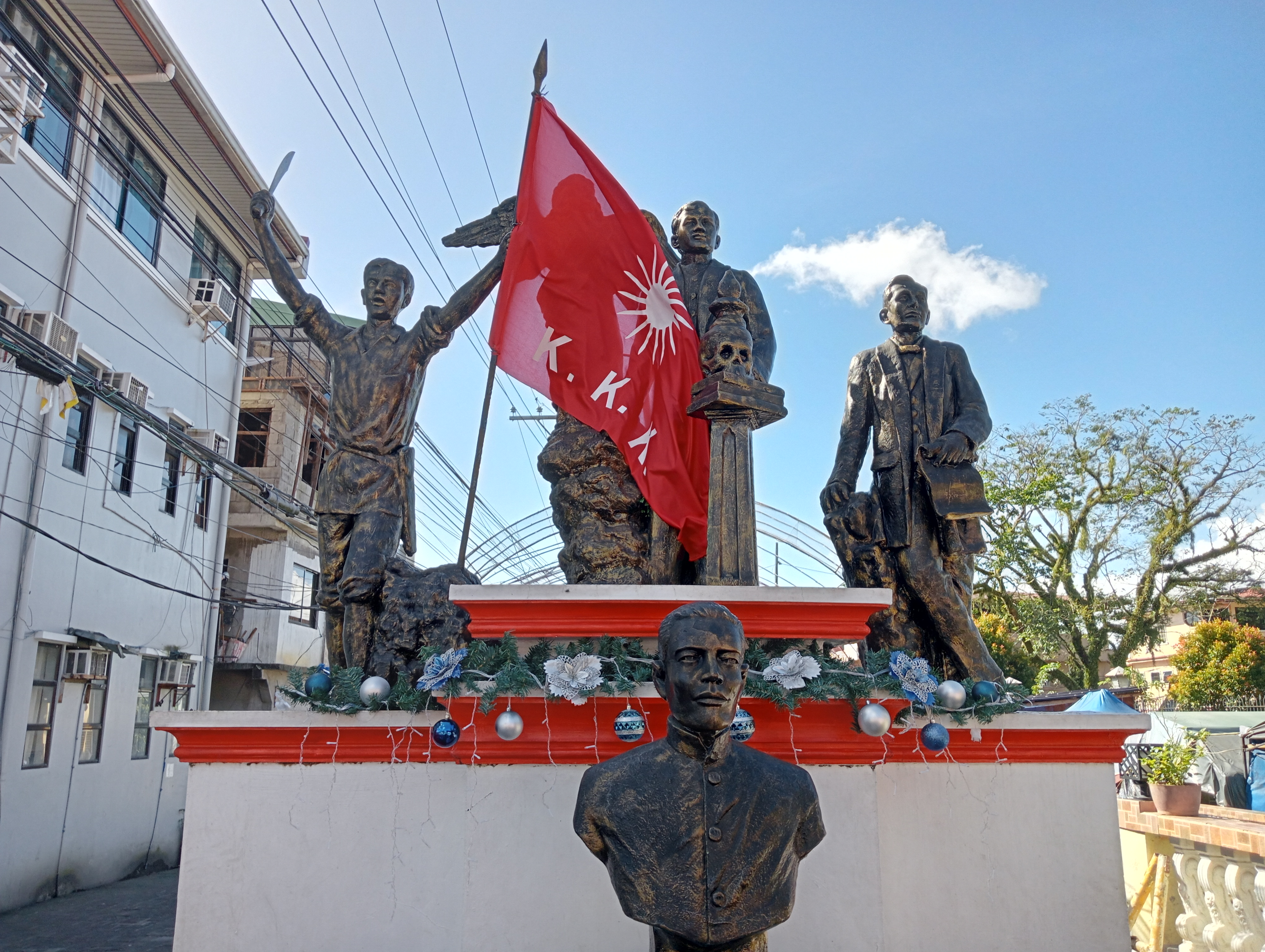
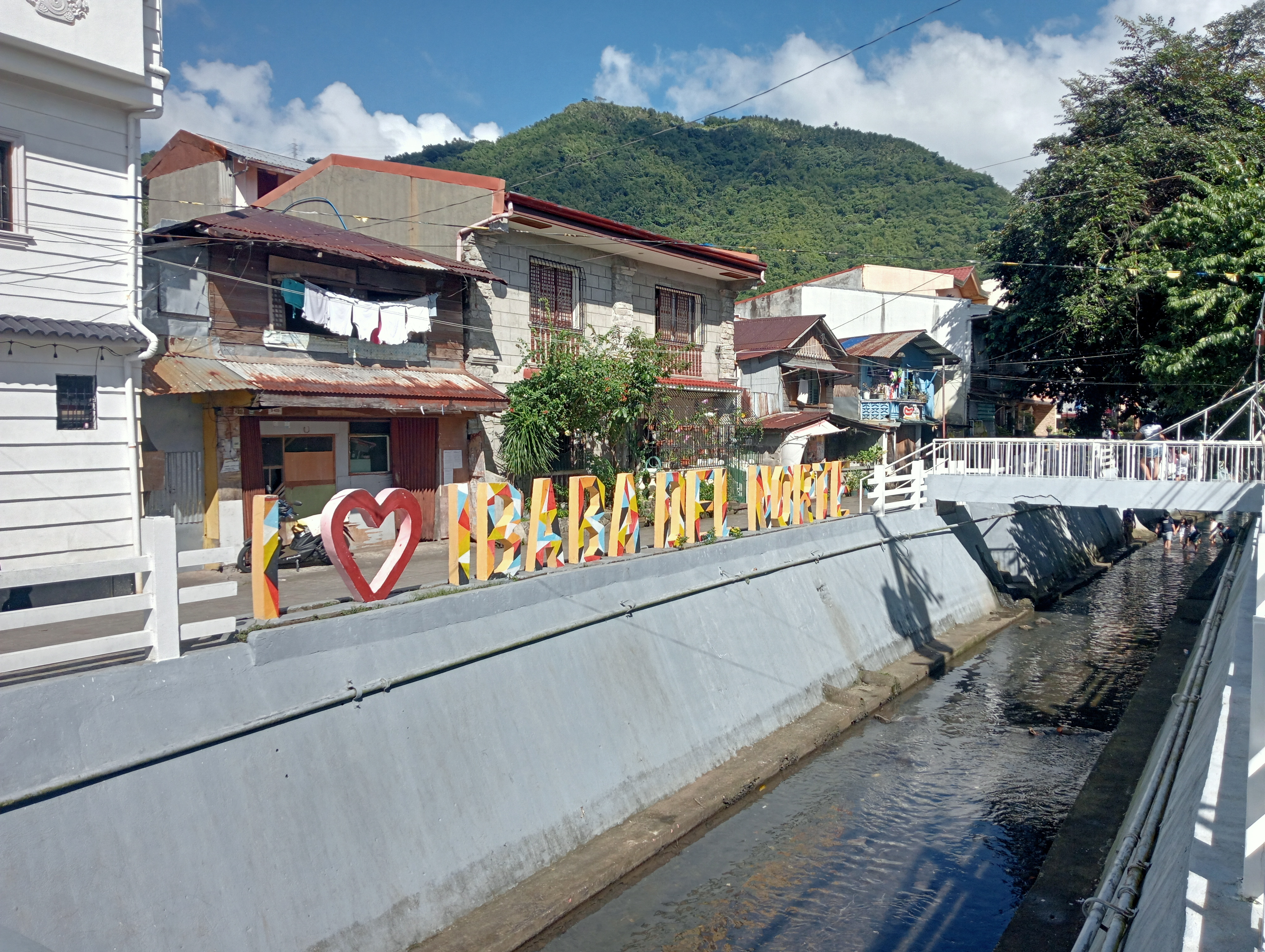
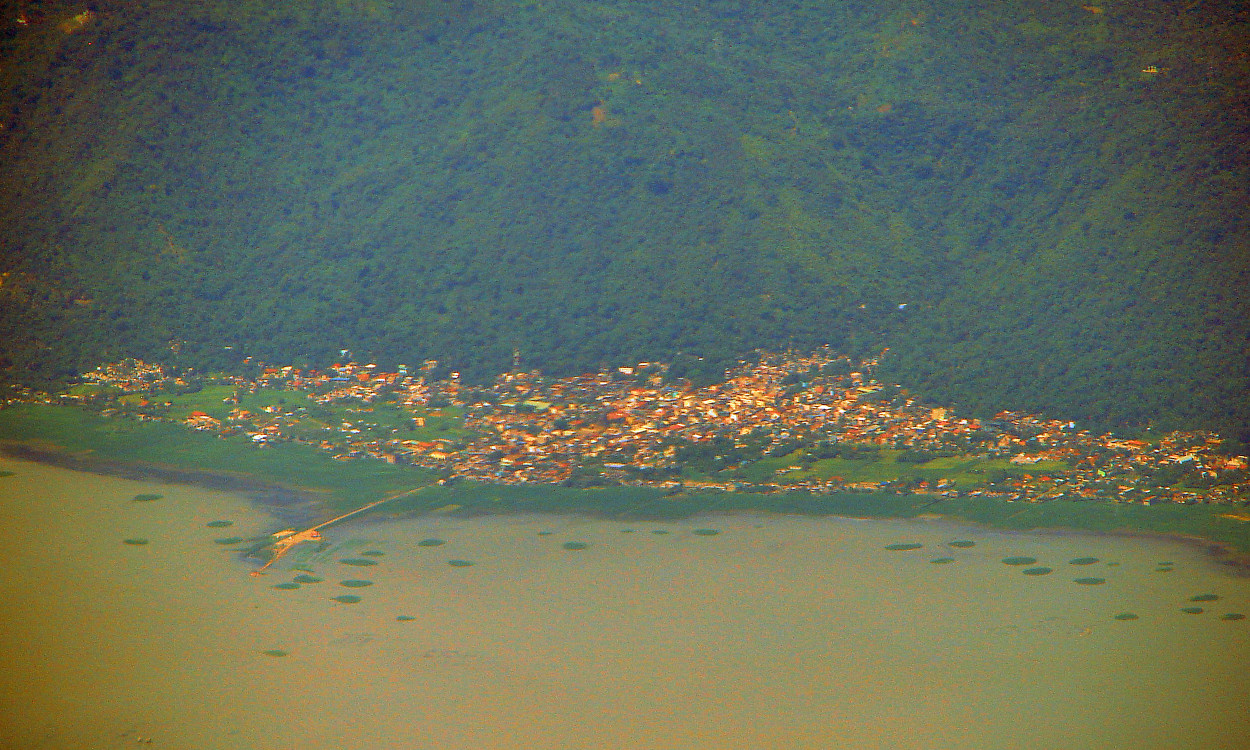
- (from top to bottom, left to right) Paete Church, National & Local Heroes Monument, Ibaba del Norte, Aerial view of Paete

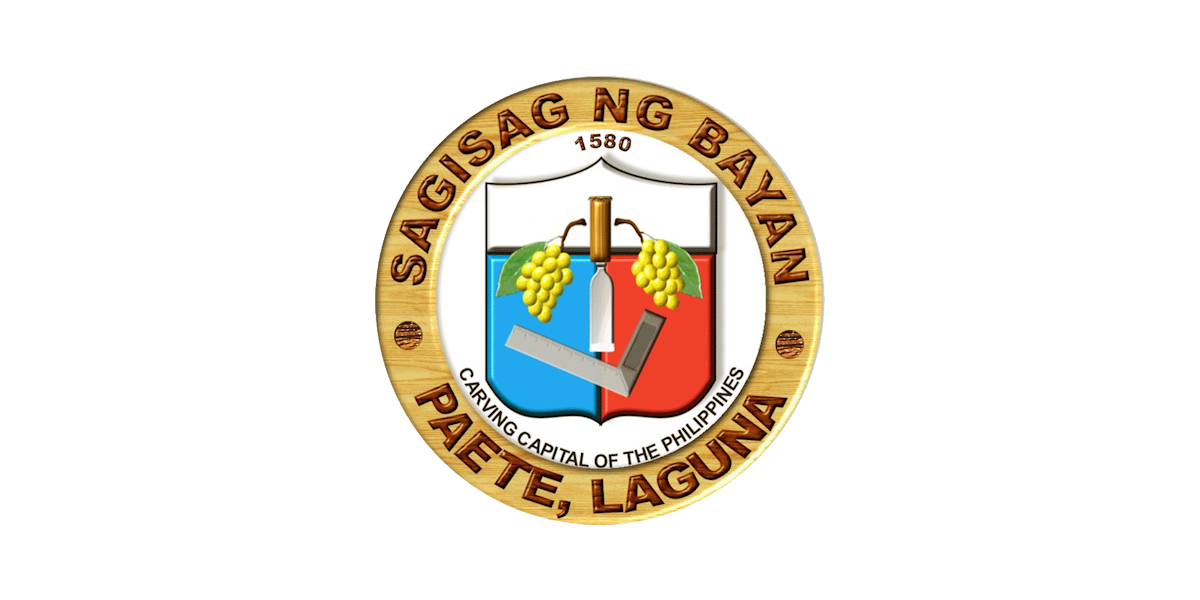
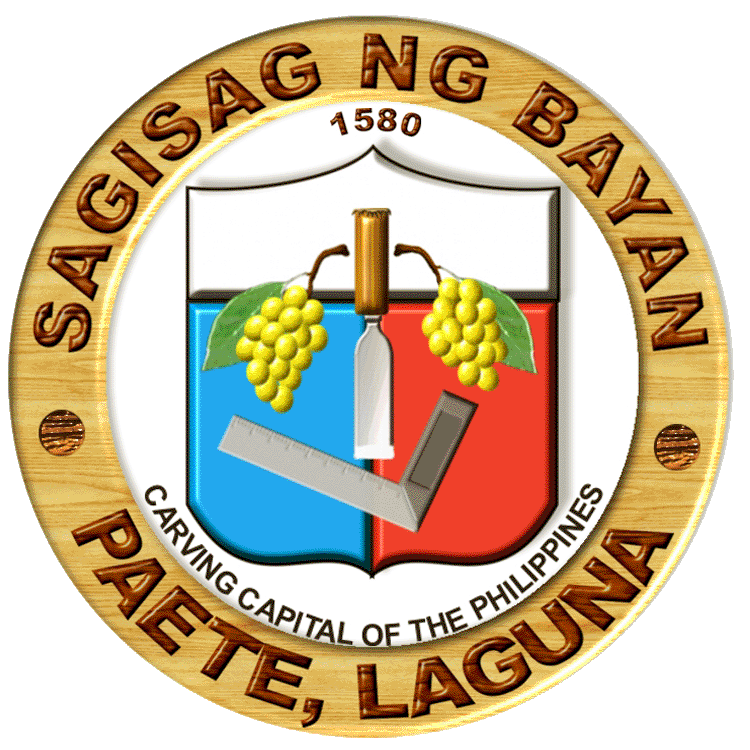
- Flag Seal
- Nickname(s): "The Carving Capital of the Philippines & The Arts Capital of Laguna"
- Map of Laguna with Paete highlighted
- Interactive map of Paete
- Location within the Philippines
- Coordinates: 14°22′N 121°29′E
- Country: Philippines
- Region: Calabarzon
- Province: Laguna
- District: 4th district
- Founded: July 25, 1580
- Barangays: 9 (Barangays)

Government
  - Mayor: Ronald “Bokwet” B. Cosico
  - Vice Mayor: Lorena B. Velasco
  - Representative: Benjamin C. Agarao Jr.
  - Municipal Councilor: Members: Florence Jude V. Cadawas; Anna Patricia A. Adao; Joshua Ryan I. Alvarez; Mark Anthony B. Bagamano; Carmen E. Valdellon; Brigido R. Bagayana; Roman Pedro M. Baldemor; Lourdes Fadul-Sunga
  - Electorate: 18,280 voters (2025)

Area
  - Total: 55.02 km^{2} (21.24 sq mi)
- Elevation: 168 m (551 ft)
- Highest elevation: 536 m (1,759 ft)
- Lowest elevation: −1 m (−3.3 ft)

Population (2024 census)
  - Total: 25,254
  - Density: 459.0/km^{2} (1,189/sq mi)
  - Households: 5,883

Economy
  - Income class: 4th municipal income class
  - Poverty incidence: 12.94% (2023)
  - Revenue: ₱ 156.7 million (2024)
  - Assets: ₱ 272.9 million (2024)
  - Expenditure: ₱ 60.05 million (2024)
  - Liabilities: ₱ 37.3 million (2024)
- ZIP code: 4016
- Native languages: Tagalog
- Website: www.paete.gov.ph

Paete, Laguna, officially the Municipality of Paete (Tagalog: Bayan ng Paete), is a municipality in the province of Laguna, Philippines, known as The Carving Capital of the Philippines. According to the 2024 census, it has a population of 25,254 people.

Along the shores of picturesque Laguna de Bay. Its ecclesiastical foundation was in 1580 by Spanish Franciscan friars Juan de Plasencia and Diego de Oropesa. It is believed that the earliest inhabitants were of Malay lineage, coming all the way from Borneo in their swift and sturdy boats called balangay.

== Etymology ==
The name of Paete is derived from the Tagalog word paet, which means chisel. The proper pronunciation of the town's name is Pī-té, long i, short guttural ê, sound at the end. The town was referred to as "Piety" by the American Maryknoll Missioners when they came to the town in the late 1950s.

Spanish friars had a tradition of naming towns they built in honor of saints. Paete was an exception. Legend has it that there was once a young Franciscan priest who was tasked by his superior to visit their newly founded settlements alongside Laguna de Bay. The priest knew little about the terrain so he asked a native the name of the place. The latter misinterpreted the young friar, thinking that the former wanted to know the name of the tool he was using. He answered "paet" (chisel), thus, the name Paete.

== History ==
=== Precolonial era ===
Spanish conquistador Juan de Salcedo was the first Spaniard to set foot in Paete. He was on his way to explore the gold-rich region of Paracale in Bicol. His men first encountered some resistance from the settlers of what is now Cainta in Rizal Province, but defeated the lightly armed natives. Then he ventured to the lakeside barangays of Laguna de Bay on his way to Bicol.

=== Spanish colonial period ===
Around 1580, Paete was established as a pueblo by the Friars. Juan de Plasencia and Diego Oropesa. Due to a death of the prior of Paete at that time, Paete was annexed to the Convent of Lumban. Then in 1600, Paete became a barrio of Pangil. In 1602, Paete became independent town having its own convent and was christened Pueblo de San Lorenzo in honor of the town's first patron saint. The pueblo consisted not only of Paete, but included the neighboring towns of Pakil, San Antonio, Longos and Kalayaan. In 1671, Fray Francisco Soller reenacted the Via Crucis to resuscitate the people's waning faith. He carried a cross from the town proper up to Mt. Ping-as in Pakil. In 1676, when Pakil became a separate pueblo, the townspeople of Paete wanted crosses of their own, so they built and located them in sitio Santa Ana, and named the site Tatlong Krus (Three Crosses). Paete regained its full township status only in 1850.

=== American colonial period ===
In 1899, American forces launched the Laguna campaign to subjugate the whole province and squelch insurrection. On the last leg of the campaign on April 12, an American battalion of 200 men invaded Paete but met strong resistance from an inexperienced force of less than 50 men. The town was subdued but it proved to be a costly battle for the Americans.

=== World War II and Japanese occupation ===
In 1942, Japanese troops occupied Paete, local recognized guerrillas and ongoing troops under the Philippine Commonwealth Army units were sieges and conflicts in Paete was fought against the Imperial Japanese military and local collaborators from 1942 to 1944 until retreat by local guerrillas from the Japanese hands. In 1945, combined Filipino and American soldiers and guerrillas liberated Paete and defeated the Japanese.

== Traditional Cultural Heritage ==
=== Ukit (carving) ===
The town has had a long reputation for its craftsmen highly skilled in wood carving (ukit) and its embellishment. In 1887, José Rizal described Paete as a town where "carpenter shops" were issuing images "even those more rudely carved" (chapter VI, Noli Me Tangere). Even now, its inhabitants (called Paeteños or Paeteñas) continue with their centuries-old tradition in carving and painting. Its statues, pulpits, murals and bas relief are found in churches, palaces and museums all over the world, including the St. Peter's Basilica in Rome, St. Patrick's Cathedral, New York, the Mission Dolorosa in San Francisco, the San Cayetano Church in Mexico, the St. Joseph's shrine in Santa Cruz, California, and various churches in the Philippines. The official town hero is not a statesman nor a soldier but a woodcarver, the master artisan Mariano B. Madriñan, whose obra maestra, the lifelike Mater Dolorosa, was honored by the King of Spain with a prestigious award in Amsterdam in 1882. The town was proclaimed "the Carving Capital of the Philippines" on March 15, 2005, by Philippine President Gloria Macapagal Arroyo.

=== Taka (papier maché) ===
Taka, papier maché made using carved wooden sculpture used as a mold, then a layers of paper and paste was used to make the wooden mold into an art piece was also originated from Paete. It is also believed that the modern yo-yo, which originated in the Philippines, was invented in Paete.

== Geography ==
Paete is located at the north-eastern part of Laguna. From Manila, Paete can be reached passing through Rizal Province via Manila East Road or via South Luzon Expressway. It is 15 kilometres (9.3 mi) from Santa Cruz, 102 kilometres (63 mi) from Manila, and 63 kilometres (39 mi) from Lucena.

=== Barangays ===
Paete is politically subdivided into 9 barangays, as indicated in the matrix below. Each barangay consists of puroks and some have sitios.

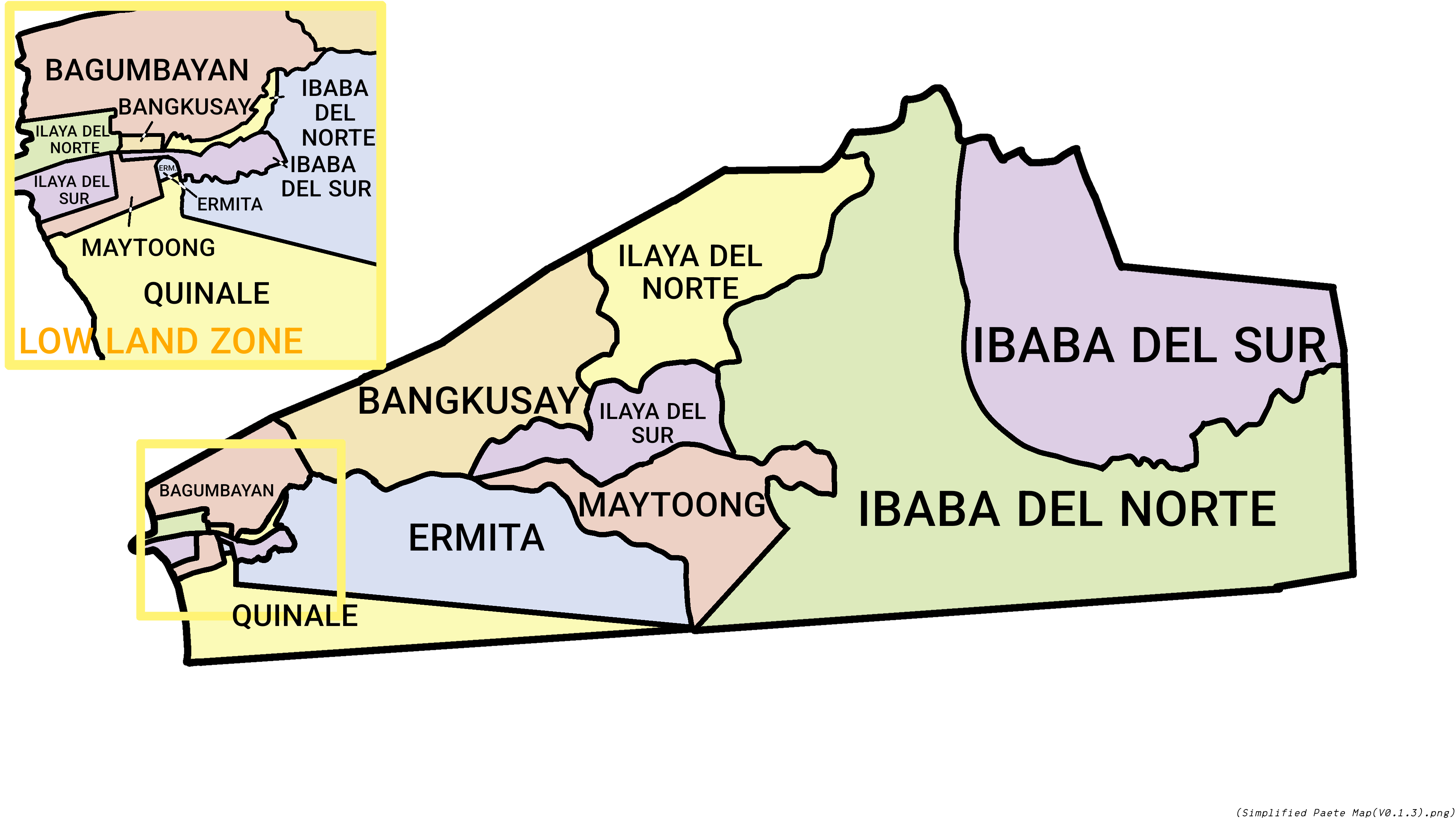
Barangays, Sitios, and Puroks Map in the low land and in the upland of Paete.

PSGC	Barangay	Population			±% p.a.	
		2024		2010		
043420001	Bagumbayan	21.8%	5,503	4,556	▴	1.31%
043420002	Bangkusay	1.9%	474	542	▾	−0.92%
043420003	Ermita	2.2%	556	583	▾	−0.33%
043420004	Ibaba del Norte	12.3%	3,108	3,024	▴	0.19%
043420005	Ibaba del Sur	9.0%	2,277	2,630	▾	−0.99%
043420006	Ilaya del Norte	9.5%	2,392	1,973	▴	1.34%
043420007	Ilaya del Sur	6.2%	1,571	1,390	▴	0.85%
043420008	Maytoong	7.2%	1,809	1,790	▴	0.07%
043420009	Quinale	28.7%	7,255	7,035	▴	0.21%
	Total		25,254	23,523	▴	0.49%

== Demographics ==
Population census of Paete
Year	Pop.	±% p.a.
1903	3,047	—
1918	4,183	+2.13%
1939	4,536	+0.39%
1948	5,546	+2.26%
1960	7,443	+2.48%
1970	11,601	+4.53%
1975	14,733	+4.91%
1980	16,383	+2.15%
1990	20,579	+2.31%
1995	21,809	+1.09%
2000	23,011	+1.16%
2007	24,696	+0.98%
2010	23,523	−1.76%
2015	25,096	+1.24%
2020	24,945	−0.13%
2024	25,254	+0.30%
Source: Philippine Statistics Authority

In the 2024 census, the population of Paete was 25,254 people, with a density of 460 inhabitants per square kilometre or 1,200 inhabitants per square mile.

=== Religion ===
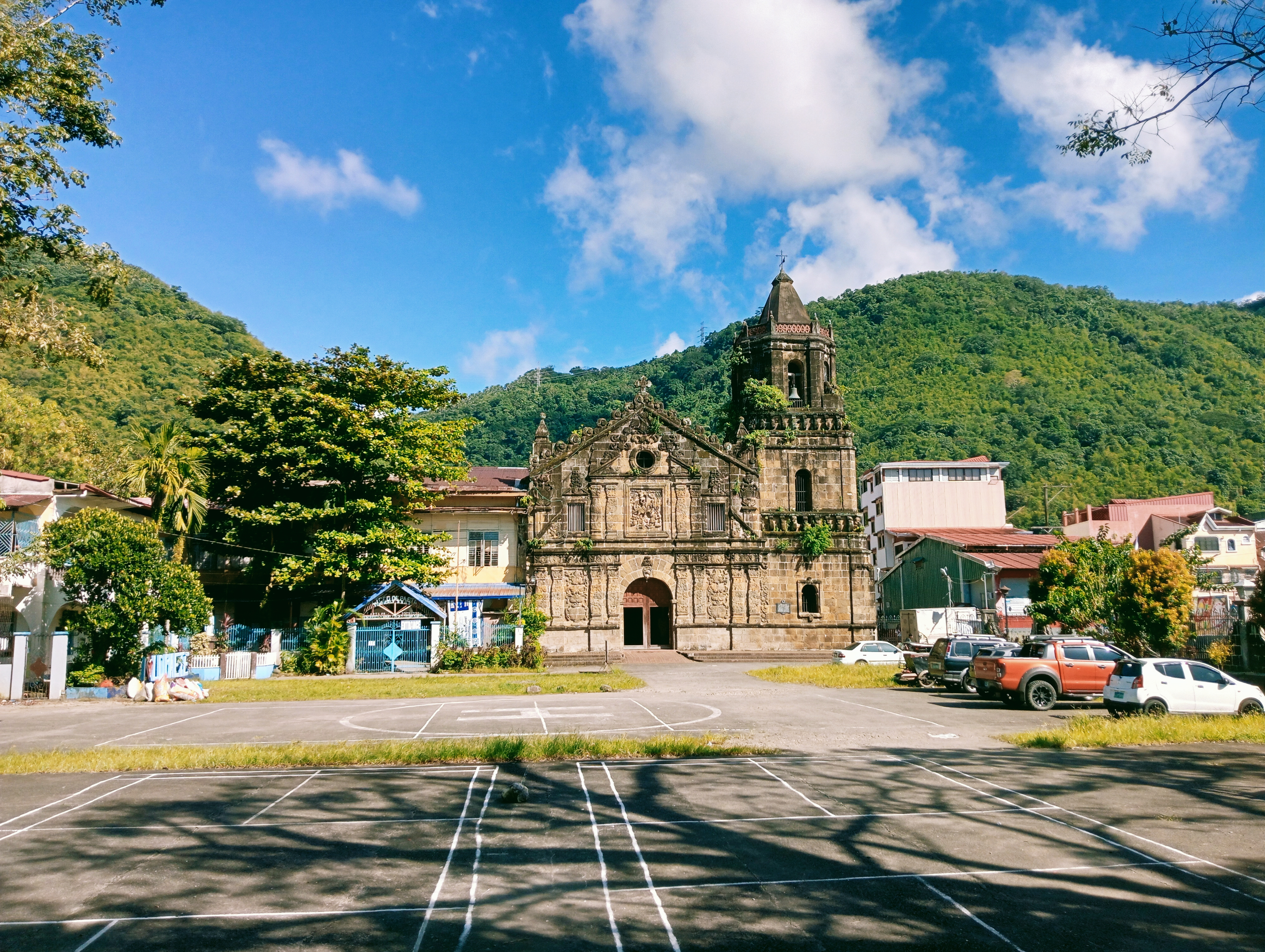
The Saint James the Apostle Parish Church simply known as Paete Church

Paete is predominantly Roman Catholics. The only Catholic Church in the town is the Saint James the Apostle Parish Church which was first built in 1646.

Paete is also a pilgrimage site. One of the primary products of the town's woodcarving industry are carvings of santos (pu-on). The town's patron saint is St. James the Apostle, also known as St. James the Great. Residents celebrate his feast day every 25th of July. The 1st Patron Saint of Paete is St. Lawrence, the deacon.

St. Anthony the Abbot is a secondary patron of the town and his feast is celebrated by the townsfolk every January 17th. The patron has a stone chapel locally known as Ermita as a shrine dedicated to him. There is a town legend related to the saint where a town native sneaked in the chapel during a conflagration and took a statue the St. Anthony to bathe it in the river. Following this, it began to rain and the fire was extinguished, an event considered as a miracle by the townsfolk.

== Economy ==
Poverty incidence of Paete (%)

Source: Philippine Statistics Authority

== Education ==
The Paete Schools District Office governs all educational institutions within the municipality. It oversees the management and operations of all private and public, from primary to secondary schools.

=== Primary and Elementary schools ===
- Ibaba Elementary School
- Paete Science and Business College (PSBC)
- Paete Elementary School
- Papatahan Elementary School
- Quinale Elementary School
- Tubog Elementary School

=== Secondary schools ===
- Liceo de Paete
- Luis C. Obial Senior High School
- Paete Science and Business College (PSBC)
- Poten & Eliseo M. Quesada Memorial National High School
- Poten & Eliseo M. Quesada Memorial National High School (Papatahan Annex)
- Stand Alone Senior High School No. 21 (Papatahan)

=== Tertiary and Higher educational institution ===
- Paete Science and Business College (Eastern Laguna Colleges)

== See also ==
- Battle of Paete
- Tatlong Krus (Paete, Laguna)
