= Three Crosses (disambiguation) =

Three Crosses can refer to:

- Three Crosses, a monument in Vilnius, Lithuania
- Three Crosses Square, an urban square in Warsaw, Poland
- Three Crosses, Swansea (Welsh: Y Crwys), a village in Wales, United Kingdom
- Three Crosses (band), an American Christian rock band from New Jersey
- The Three Crosses, a print in etching and drypoint by the Dutch artist Rembrandt van Rijn
- Three Crosses of Paete, a sculpture in Laguna, Philippines

== See also ==
- Church of the Three Crosses, a Lutheran church in Kaukopää, Imatra, Finland
- Three Crosses Not to Die or Three Crosses of Death, a 1968 Italian Spaghetti Western film
- "Three Wooden Crosses", 2002 single by Randy Travis
- Three Wooden Crosses: The Inspirational Hits of Randy Travis, 2009 album
