= Gat Pangil =

Legendary Tagalog ruler

Gat Pangil was a legendary Tagalog ruler whom legends say ruled in the area now known as Laguna Province, Philippines.

Pangil plays a part in the town founding myths for the municipalities of Bay, Laguna, Pangil, Laguna, Pakil, Laguna and Mauban, Quezon, – all of which are said to have been part of his dominions.
