= Battle of Paete =

1899 battle in Laguna, Philippines

- Part of the Philippine–American War
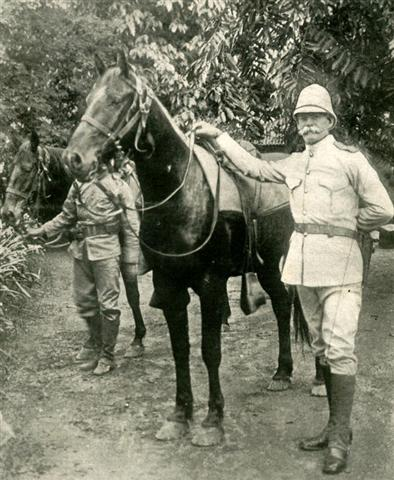
- General Lawton campaigning in the Philippines, 1899
Date	12 April 1899
Location	Paete, Laguna
Result	American victory

Belligerents
United States	First Philippine Republic

Commanders and leaders
(United States) Henry W. Lawton	(First Philippine Republic) Unknown

Strength
220 soldiers 1 gunboat	50 infantry

Casualties and losses
55 killed 2 wounded	15 killed & wounded

The Battle of Paete (Pronounced Pie-tê) was a small battle fought between American forces, commanded by General Henry W. Lawton, and Philippine nationalists on April 12, 1899, during the Philippine–American War.

== Background ==
Upon capturing Santa Cruz and Pagsanjan, the American forces in Laguna launched another expedition to capture the town of Paete.

The United States Army assembled a force of about 220 men to capture the town, and began the march at 2:45 that afternoon. After about a one-hour march, the commander of the 1st North Dakota Volunteers, Major Fraine, ordered five men as scouts 100 yards ahead to locate the enemy positions. They soon spotted enemy breast works 150 yards in front of them, manned by 50 or so Filipino fighters. Major Fraine then halted the command and sent a small squad consisting of one corporal and four privates to flank the Filipino positions.

== Battle ==
Some Filipino troops were hidden in thick foliage flanking the road, and they opened fire at close range on the small force, quickly dispatching them. Three of the squad members, including Corporal Isador Driscoll, were killed outright and another fell mortally wounded. Only one man was left after the volley, Private Thomas Sletteland, but he managed to drive back the nearest group of Filipinos, who repeatedly tried seize the rifles of his fallen comrades. He was later awarded the Medal of Honor for his role in this battle.

Lawton then deployed the majority of his men to attack and try and turn the flank of the enemy, which they were unable to do. The Americans attacking the front Filipino entrenchments were also unable to move them from their position. The American artillery battery then fired a few shrapnel rounds into the enemy positions, as the gunboat Laguna de Bay pelted the position with Gatling fire, which succeeded in dislodging the Filipinos.

Facing superior numbers and firepower, the Filipinos abandoned their entrenchments and dispersed into the mountains. Lawton's force then went on to occupy Paete with no further resistance.

Lawton's official report reads:

"With a view to securing a good place to re-embark the troops for the movement on Calamba, the North Dakota Battalion was sent from Longos shortly after noon the 12th instant to reconnoiter the town of Paete, located about four miles further north on the lake shore, where it could be reported a good landing place could be found. After advancing about one mile the enemy was discovered entrenched across the road, and immediately opened fire from behind almost impenetrable undergrowth, on the mountain side. Major Fraine, promptly disposed his command to execute a flank movement on the enemy, who were pouring heavy fire into the advance guard, four of them were killed and three wounded, one mortally, of these, the latter and three killed belonged to a party of five flankers who had been sent up the hillside. Their surviving comrade, Private Thomas Sletteland, Co. "C" 1st North Dakotas, remained with them and by his cool and unerring aim successfully held the enemy back until reinforcements came. Then after carrying his wounded comrade to the rear, he assisted in recovering the bodies of the killed. He has been recommended for a medal of honor.

At the first sound of firing, Lieut. William Brooke, 4th U. S. Infantry: (Now Captain 35th U.S. Vol. Infantry,) Aid-de-camp, was sent to ascertain in the cause. He reported the engagement of the North Dakotas and asked for reinforcements. The Artillery with its support, Co. "D" 14th infantry and the Sharpshooters were hastened forward under command of Major Weisenburger. Boarding the gunboat "Laguna de Bay" a position was secured near the beach from which it was possible to aid the Artillery in shelling the enemy.

After an engagement lasting about one hour the enemy was driven up the mountain side and dispersed. The command then continued to and occupied Paete without further resistance."
