= Taka (paper mache) =

Paper-mâché using wooden carving as a mold

Horses in taka papier mâché from Laguna.

Taka (taká) refers to papier-mâché made using carved wooden sculpture used as a mold. The craft originated in the town of Paete, Laguna in the Philippines.

== History ==
Taka was made by Paete local Maria Piday. During Christmas, Piday was in charge of the church's decorations. The wooden angels and cherub was heavy causing the carvings to fall. Piday devised the lightweight taka papier-mâché as an alternative to the wooden sculptures. Piday was also a maker of local toys such as yoyos and small acrobat hand puppet. Taka eventually became folk art and was sold to nearby towns for festivals. In the 1970s, Tere Afuang popularized the craft.

== Taka-making ==
A takaan, a carved wooden sculpture, is used as a mold in making taka. Brown craft paper is used as a final layer for taka made for export. This provides a thicker base and smoother finish for the craft. Taka is also painted. The traditional way of painting a taka is to use primary colors, add simple flower motifs and use repetitive lines and shapes. Gold finish, usually used in angel, reindeer and huge taka is accomplished by using gilded paper.

=== Subjects of Taka ===
Common and traditional subjects of taka include the manok, kabayo, kalabaw, dalaga (chicken, horse, carabao, maiden) which is made primarily for local use. Due to exposure and migration of Paete residents to Manila and abroad, European-influenced papier-mâché toys began to be made for export to other countries, such as Germany. Taka images now include those of Santa Claus, reindeer, giraffes, and other subjects that are in demand.

=== Contemporary Taka-making ===
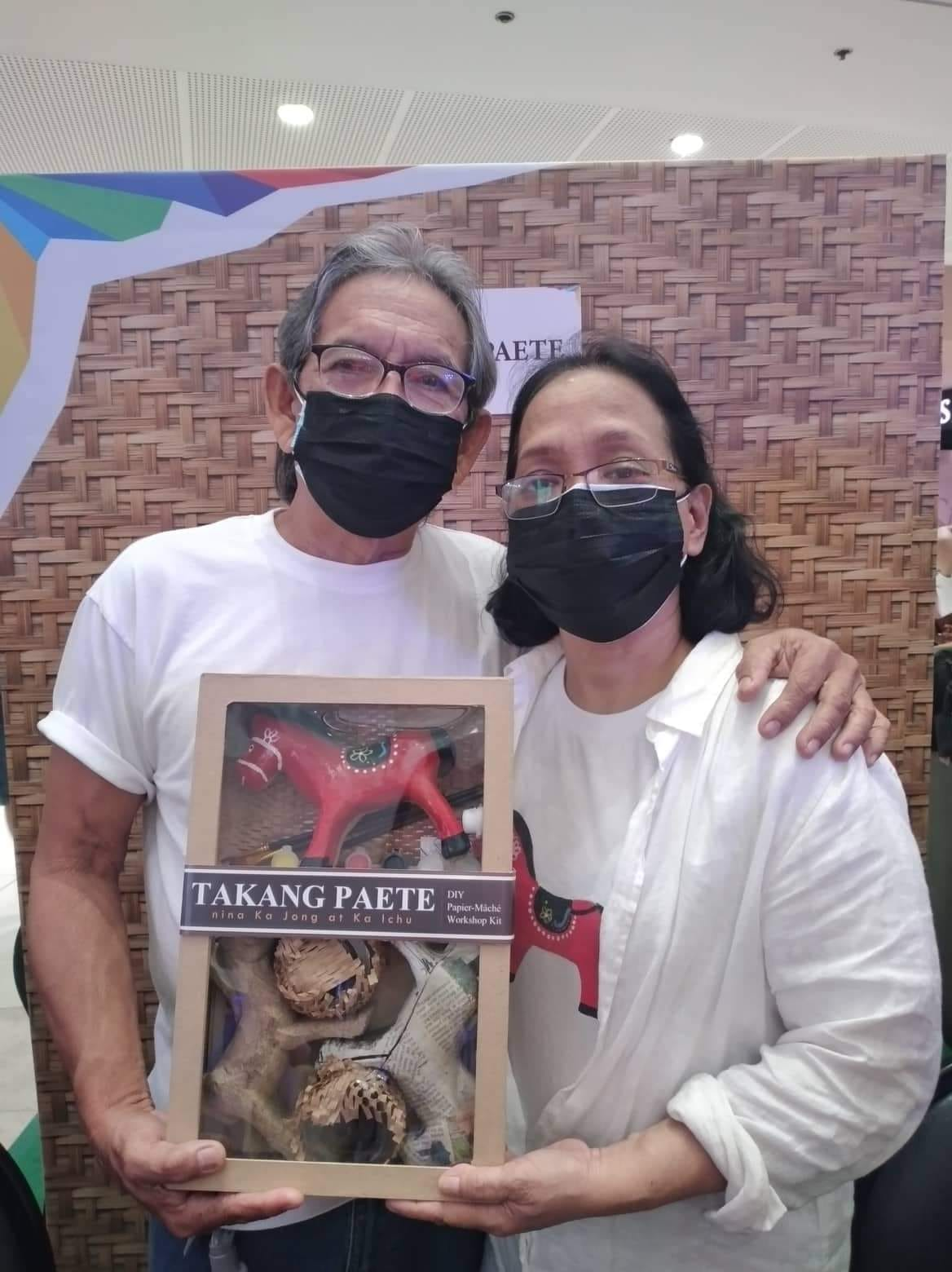
Photo of couple Pablo Adao Jr. and Marichu Mendoza Adao holding the DIY taka workshop kit their family curated

There are ongoing efforts to preserve taka-making as part of heritage practices. This includes DIY kits, exhibitions and workshops and efforts to document local crafts.
