= Pangil Church =

Roman Catholic church in Laguna, Philippines

- Nuestra Señora dela Natividad Parish Church
- Our Lady's Nativity Parish
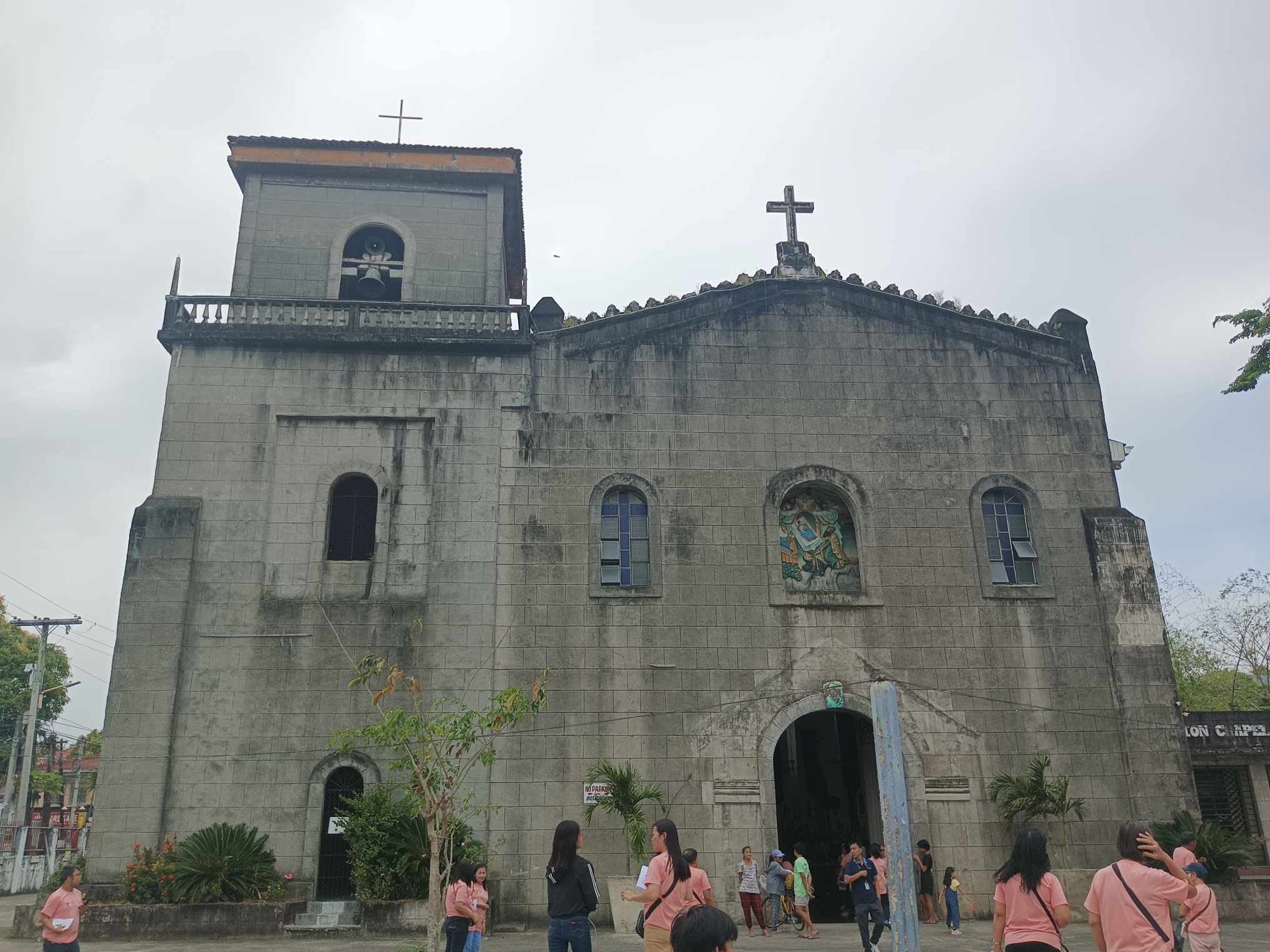
- Church facade, circa 2024

- Location in Laguna Location in Luzon Location in the Philippines
- 14°24′13″N 121°28′06″E
- Location: Pangil, Laguna
- Country: Philippines
- Denomination: Roman Catholic

History
- Status: Parish church
- Founded: 1579
- Founder(s): Juan de Plasencia and Diego Oropesa
- Dedication: Nativity of the Blessed Virgin Mary

Architecture
- Functional status: Active
- Architectural type: Church building
- Style: Baroque
- Completed: 1611

Administration
- Province: Manila
- Metropolis: Manila
- Archdiocese: Manila
- Diocese: San Pablo
- Deanery: St. James

Clergy
- Priest: Jeric Advincula

The Nuestra Señora dela Natividad Parish Church, commonly known as Pangil Church, is a Roman Catholic church in Natividad, Pangil, Laguna, Philippines. It is under the jurisdiction of the Diocese of San Pablo. The statue of the pregnant Virgin Mary (locally known as Nuestra Señora de la O) & the child Jesus (locally known as St. Niño de la O) were said to be gifts from King Carlos III of Spain.

== History ==
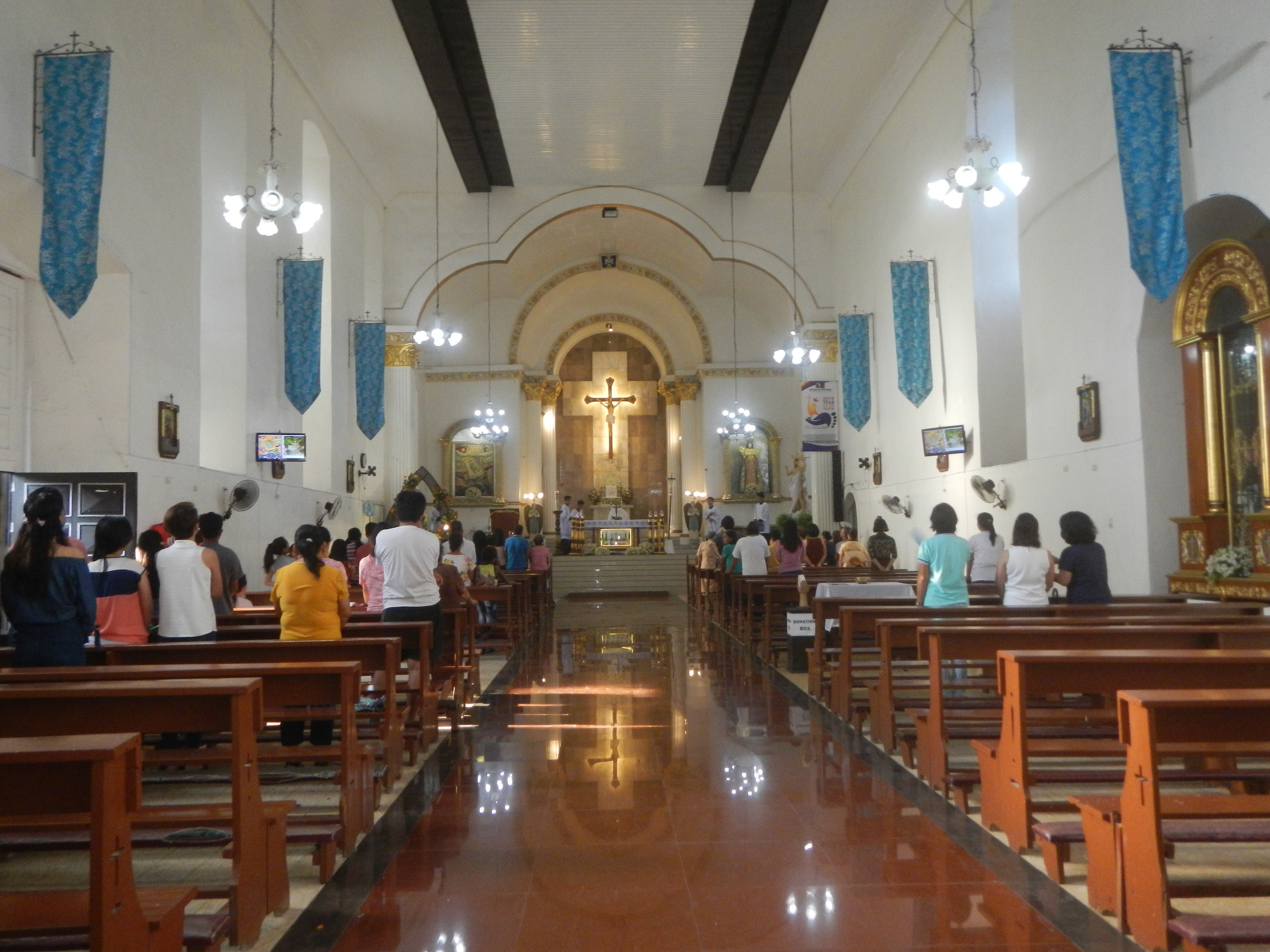
Church interior in 2019

Pangil was founded as a visita or hermitage by Franciscan friars Juan de Plasencia and Diego de Oropesa in 1579. It was administered by the nearby parish of Lumban due to lack of priests. The first church dedicated to the Nativity of the Blessed Virgin Mary was built out of cane. In 1611, a stone church and convent was built under the direction of Father Gonzalo del Roble. Restoration of the church's woodwork and improvement of the convent was done by Father Lucas Fernandez in 1711. The church was remodeled in 1749 to 1751 by Father Luis de Nambroca. Based on the records of Father Felix Huerta, the church has also a stone chapel dedicated to Saint Mark the Evangelist and Saint Anthony Abad.

== Nuestra Señora de la O and Santo Niño de la O ==
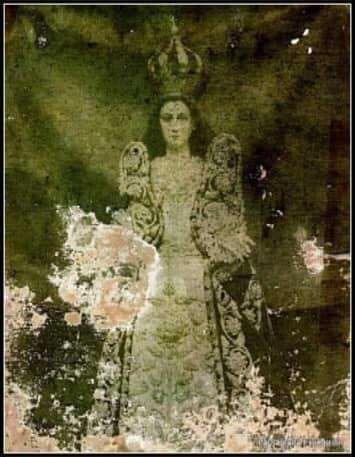
A photo of the original image of Virgen de la O, which was destroyed during World War 2.

The town of Pangil is blessed by the patron saints ‘Nuestra Señora de la O’ and the ‘Santo Niño de la O.’

This patronage is unique. Perhaps, in the entire country, it is only here that there exists a Virgin Mary and a Holy Child like this. The “Virgin of the O” symbolizes Mary’s pregnancy with the child Jesus Christ. The “Holy Child of the O” represents the infant Jesus while he was still in his mother Mary’s womb.

Anyone who shares this story of mother and child demonstrates a deep knowledge of faith. They are fitting patrons for expectant mothers and children. Numerous stories of miracles and help from the patrons are recounted by devotees, especially in aiding mothers in labor, infants, and young children.

The novena for the patrons is celebrated from December 16 to December 24, with the feast day held on December 18

=== Etymology ===
The name may be inspired by the prayers and praises to the Blessed Virgin during December, which often begin with:

“O Mary”

“O Beautiful Virgin”

“O Our Mother”

It could also be based on a chapter in the Blessed Virgin’s life—her visit to her cousin Elizabeth. According to the Holy Scriptures, in the third month of her pregnancy, Mary visited Elizabeth. She was greatly surprised to see that her cousin was also pregnant and close to term. This was astonishing because Elizabeth was over a hundred years old and considered barren. The Virgin’s hand is depicted in a surprised gesture, and her beautiful face seems to be gazing somewhere, as if uttering an astonished “O.” The feast of the Virgin of the O is celebrated on December 18, symbolizing the third month of Mary’s pregnancy with Jesus.

The Holy Scriptures also describe the stirring of two unborn children in the wombs—Jesus in Mary’s and John the Baptist in Elizabeth’s. The two greeted each other while still in their mothers’ wombs

The name “Nuestra Señora de la O” originates from a unique antiphon, distinct from the Roman “O” antiphons, which are not part of the Mozarabic Rite. This antiphon goes: “O Virgin of virgins, how shall this be? For there has never been one like you, nor will there ever be. Daughters of Jerusalem, why do you marvel at me? What you see is a divine mystery.” Additionally, on that day, choir clerics would chant a prolonged “O” after Vespers to symbolize the world’s yearning for the coming of the Redeemer. Each morning during the octave, a High Mass is celebrated early, and it is customary for expectant mothers, regardless of status, to attend, honoring Our Lady’s motherhood and seeking her blessing.

=== Origin of the Virgin and the Holy Child of the O ===
The images of the Virgin and the Holy Child of the O were believed to be gifts from King Charles III of Spain to the town of Pangil.

Sometime in 1724, Prince Carlos, son of King Philip V of Spain was exiled because of alleged misdeeds & came to the Philippines. He stayed in Pangil for 3 years due to the size of its convent. He grew fond of the town and its people because of his humble nature and love of nature. He enjoyed hunting and bathing in the river, which led locals to name a nearby river ‘Bambang Hari’ (King’s Stream).

Three years later, the prince returned to Spain and was crowned King Charles III following the death of King Ferdinand VI, his half-brother and former King Philip V. After his coronation, King Charles III sent the images of the “Virgin of the O” and “Holy Child of the O” to Pangil as a token of gratitude. According to tradition, these images were adorned with a scepter and crown.

=== The Journey ===
From Spain to the Philippines, the Virgin and the Holy Child were transported by ship. The images were transferred to a vessel that traveled from Manila Bay, through the Pasig River, and finally reached Laguna Lake. They were joyously received at the lakeside in Estaca by locals who, perhaps due to a sudden rain, wore their traditional headdress or bandana. This would be the start of what would be known as Bandana Festival. According to tradition, the emissaries had mistakenly gone to another town where the images became difficult to deliver them. Only when they reached their original destination of Pangil, Laguna did the images become easy to carry, ensuing a safe delivery of the images.

=== Miraculous Stories of the ‘Virgen de la O’ ===
Many stories of miracles have been passed down orally. During the American period, a cholera epidemic spread in Pangil. Every day, many fell ill, died, and were quickly buried. People were astonished when the Virgen de la O was found missing from her altar. Witnesses claimed to have seen a tall woman bathing at the head of the Pangil River. She was seen returning to the church. When townspeople checked the Virgin de la O, they noticed her hair was wet. Many people bathed, drank, and collected water from the Pangil River. From that time on, the cholera epidemic ceased in the entire town of Pangil.

On another occasion, the body and feet of the Blessed Virgin were washed in a stream beside the church. Suddenly, the water rose and flooded the town, even though it was a clear, sunny day. The flood receded only after the body and feet were removed from the stream.

== Bibliography ==
- Huerta, Felix de (1865). Estado geográfico, topográfico, estadístico, histórico-religioso [Geographical, topographical, statistical, historical and religious state] (in Spanish). Binondo: Imprenta de M. Sanchez y Ca.
