= San Sebastian Parish Church (Lumban) =

Roman Catholic church in Laguna, Philippines

Lumban Church
- San Sebastian Parish Church
- Parroquia de San Sebastian (Spanish)
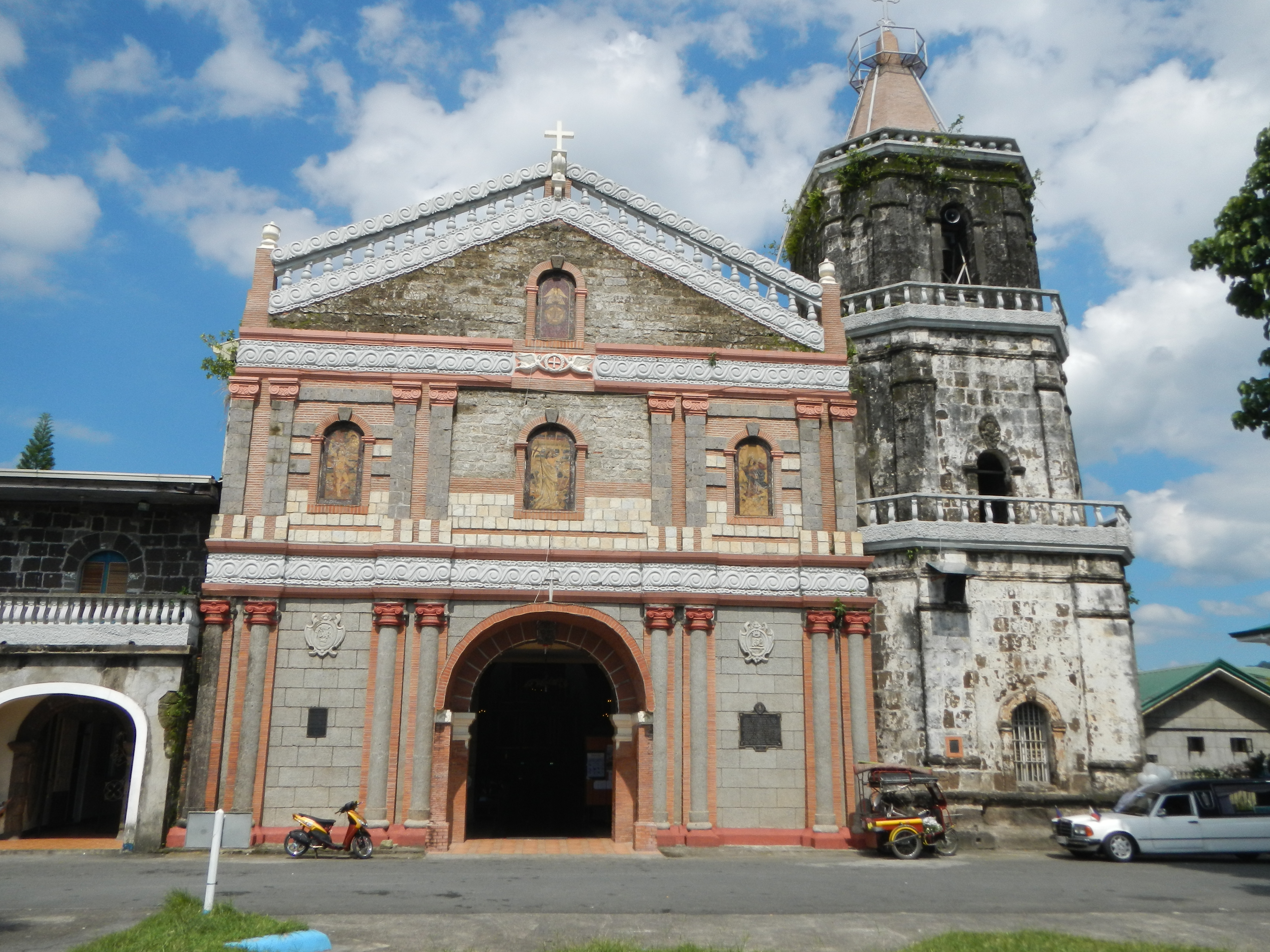
- Church facade in 2013

- Location in Laguna Location in Luzon Location in the Philippines
- 14°17′51″N 121°27′34″E
- Location: Lumban, Laguna
- Country: Philippines
- Denomination: Roman Catholic
- Website: web.archive.org/web/20230320142339/https://www.sansebastianparishlumban.org/

History
- Status: Parish church
- Founded: 1578; 448 years ago
- Founder: Franciscans
- Dedication: St. Sebastian

Architecture
- Functional status: Active
- Heritage designation: 1939
- Architectural type: Church building
- Completed: 1600

Specifications
- Materials: Adobe

Administration
- Province: Manila
- Metropolis: Manila
- Archdiocese: Manila
- Diocese: San Pablo
- Deanery: Our Lady of Guadalupe

Clergy
- Archbishop: Jose Advincula
- Bishop: Marcelino Antonio Maralit, Jr.
- Priest(s): Ricardo Basquinez, M.F.; Frederick Torres, M.F.; Edilberto Mesias, M.F.; Elorde Demetillo, M.F.

San Sebastian Parish Church, commonly known as Lumban Church, is a Roman Catholic church in Lumban, Laguna, Philippines. Its titular is St. Sebastian and its feast is celebrated every January 20. It is under the jurisdiction of the Diocese of San Pablo. The first stone church and the first tabernacle outside Manila was inaugurated in Lumban including the first Eucharistic Procession outside of Manila. The Franciscans established the first School for Church Music in the country in this town under Juan de Santa Maria. Today, the church is under the pastoral care of the Clerical Congregation of the Missionaries of Faith.

== History ==
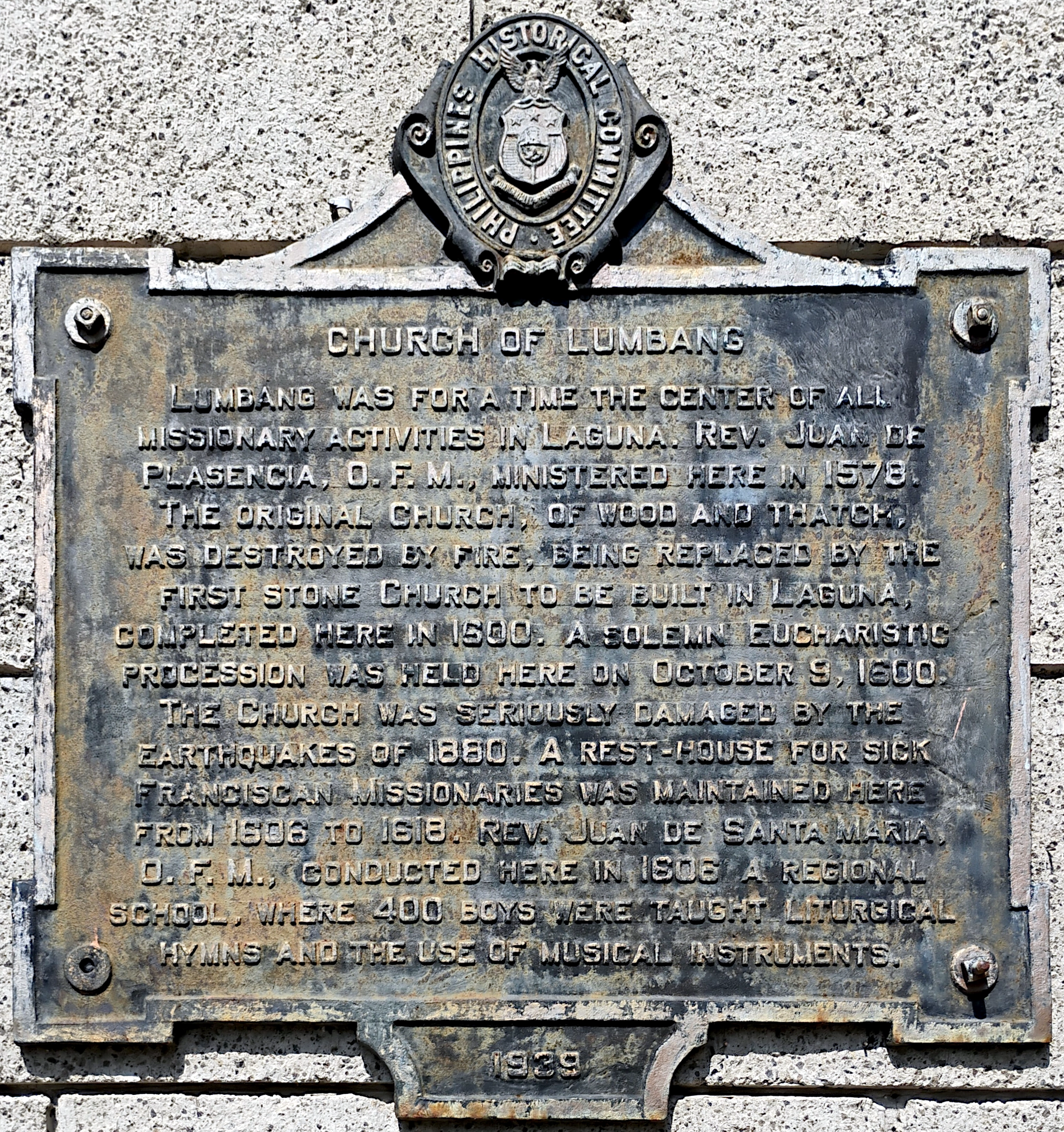
Church PHC historical marker installed in 1939

When the Franciscans first arrived in the Philippines in 1578, Father Juan de Plasencia and Father Diego de Oropesa de San José started the evangelization of the province of Laguna. Lumban, together with Pila became the first Spanish town of the province and heart of the Franciscan missionary activities in Laguna. Father Juán de Plasencia served as parish priest of Lumban in 1578 with St. Francis of Assisi as its original patron. A church made of nipa and bamboo was first built in a site called Entablado, in the northern portion of the town. The first church was destroyed by flood and later rebuilt in wood. However, the wooden church was burned in 1586. Lumban became the first Franciscan mission settlement in the country. The government allowed San Pedro Bautista to build the church and convent in stone on that same year.

The church of Lumban was finished in 1600. It became the first stone church in Laguna and outside Manila made out of stone.

In this church, the first tabernacle outside Manila was built, leading to the first Eucharistic Procession outside of Manila on October 9, 1600. On October 8, prior to the eucharistic procession, choirs from Santa Ana de Sapa, Pangil, Nagcarlan, Pila and Lumban sang in a mass officiated by Father Juan Montes de Oca, provincial of the Augustinians. Based on the records of Felix Huerta, the parish has two chapels dedicated to Saint Sebastian and the Holy Cross. Adjacent to the church is the church convent (convento) built under the term of Father Francisco de Cañaveras.

The first School for Church Music in the country was established by the Franciscans in Lumban under Father Juan de Santa Maria, OFM on 1606. Around 400 boys were taught liturgical hymns and use of musical instruments. The church also served as infirmary or hospital of the male Franciscan religious from 1606 to 1618 before it was transferred to Pila.

In the 18th century, the town adopted Saint Sebastian Martyr as its patron saint. It was seriously damaged during the 1880 Luzon earthquakes. and was restored by Father Manuel Rodriguez in 1889. The massive church of Lumban was completed in its original form during the American occupation and was dubbed as the biggest stone church in Laguna. It was again heavily damaged during the Japanese occupation in 1941 and a storm in 1947.

== Architecture ==
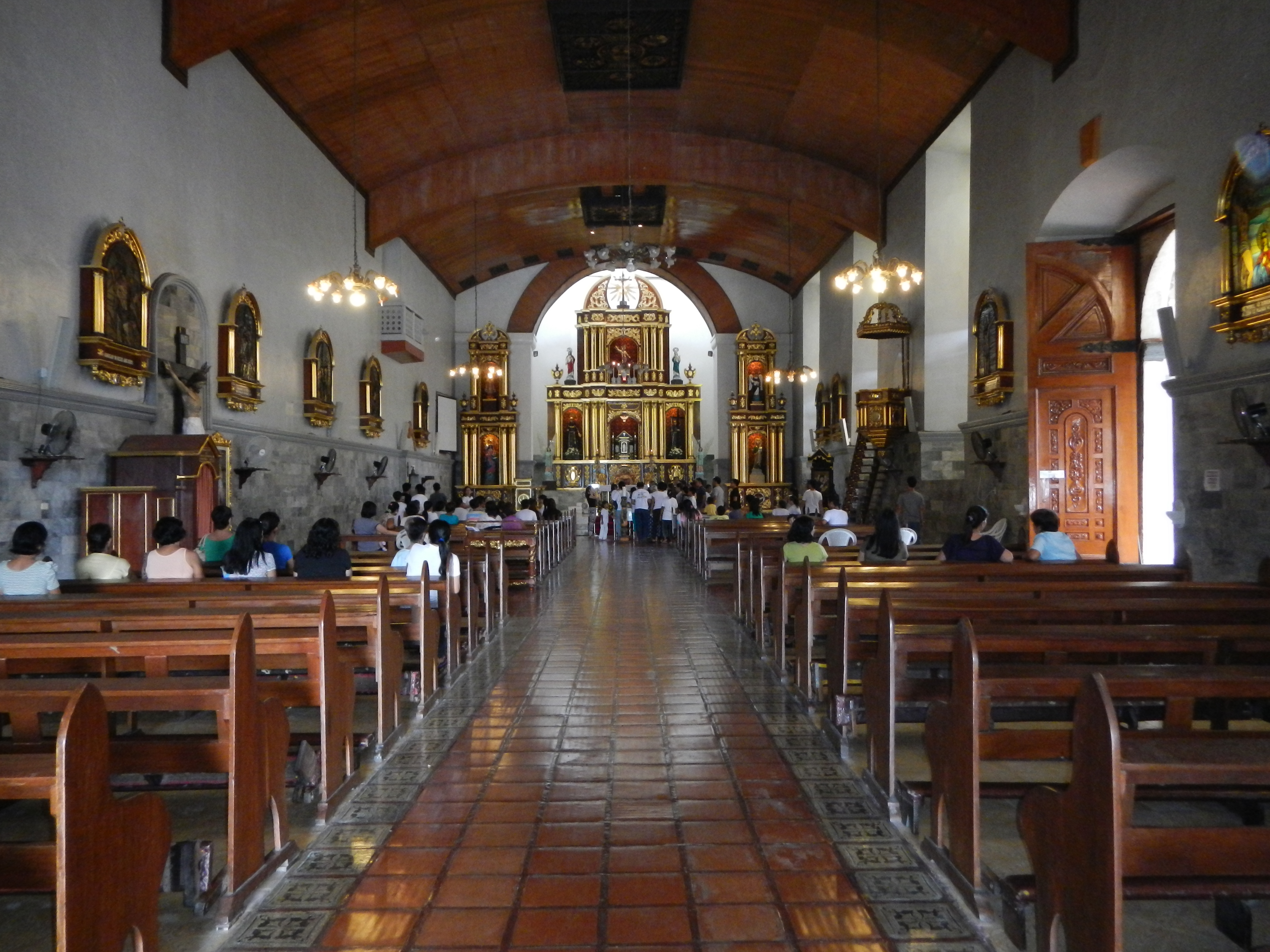
Church interior in 2013

The church has a three-story facade. To its right is a square based three level octagonal bell tower with the statue of San Sebastian, its patron saint on top.

== Media ==
The church appears in the ABS-CBN television series Huwag Kang Mangamba, depicted as Hermoso church that was later burned down.

== Bibliography ==
- Huerta, Felix de (1865). Estado geográfico, topográfico, estadístico, histórico-religioso: de la santa y apostólica provincia de S. Gregorio Magno, de religiosos Menores descalzos de la regular y más estrecha observancia de N.S.P.S. Francisco, en las Islas Filipinas: comprende el número de religiosos, conventos, pueblos, situación de estos, años de su fundación, tributos, almas, producciones, industrias, cosas y casos especiales de su administración espiritual, en el archipiélago filipino, desde su fundación en el año de 1577 hasta el de 1865 [Geographical, topographical, statistical, historical and religious state of the holy and apostolic province of S. Gregorio Magno] (in Spanish). Binondo: Imprenta de M. Sanchez y Ca.
- Historical Markers: Regions I-IV and CAR (in Filipino). Manila: National Historical Institute (Philippines). 1993. p. 105. ISBN 9715380611.
