= Three Crosses of Paete =

Sculpture in Laguna, Philippines

Coordinates: 14.364964°N 121.492207°E

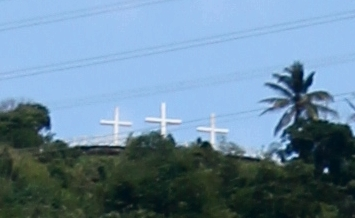
The Three Crosses of Paete

The Tatlong Krus (English: Three Crosses) are three crosses on the peak of Mount Humarap, part of the Sierra Madre located in Paete, in the province of Laguna, along the northeastern coast of Luzon island in the Philippines. The Three Crosses started out with three wooden crosses and now are made of concrete.
