= Pangil =

Municipality in Laguna, Philippines

- Municipality
- Municipality of Pangil
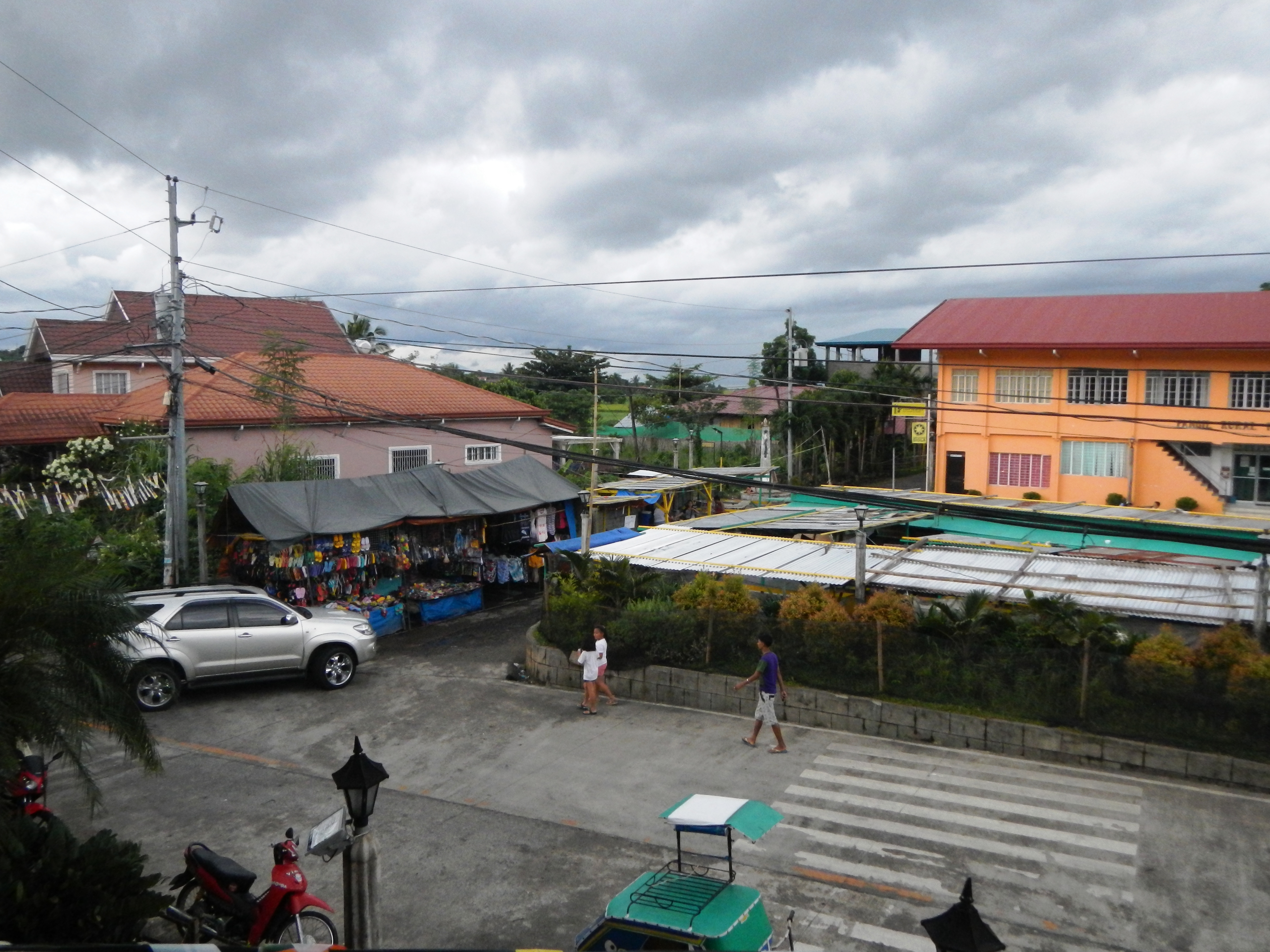
- Downtown area

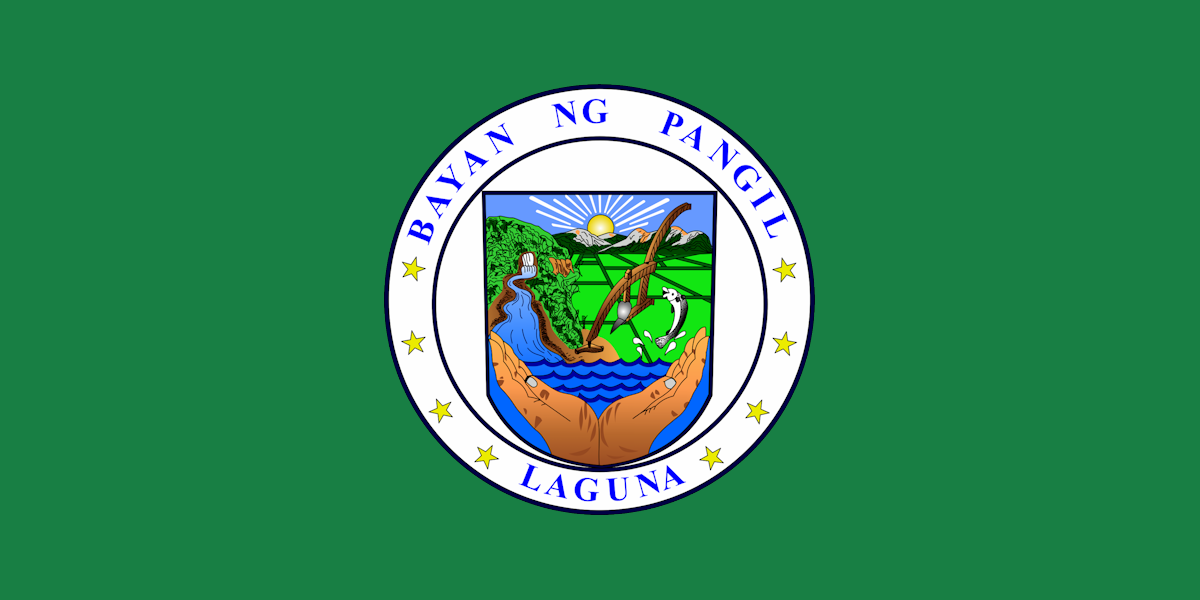
- Flag Seal
- Nicknames: "Tunay na Bayan ni Maria" "The Home of Nuestra Señora and Santo Niño De La O"
- Anthem: Pangil Hymn
- Map of Laguna with Pangil highlighted
- Interactive map of Pangil
- Location within the Philippines
- Coordinates: 14°24′N 121°28′E
- Country: Philippines
- Region: Calabarzon
- Province: Laguna
- District: 4th district
- Founded: September 8, 1579
- Annexation to Siniloan: October 12, 1903
- Barangays: 8 (see Barangays)

Government
  - Type: Sangguniang Bayan
  - Mayor: Gerald A. Aritao
  - Vice Mayor: Rianne May M. Diaz
  - Representative: Benjamin C. Agarao
  - Municipal Council: Members: Cesar Q. Ader Jr.; Herbert DR. Bautista; Marlon B. Basas; Oscar F. Rafanan; Jubert V. Aritao; Gregorio D. Subaybay; Jemuel Joe B. Durante; Gildo D. Aguilar; Neil O. Acaylar (ABC); Havanna Eve Monserrat (SKF)
  - Electorate: 17,787 voters (2025)

Area
  - Total: 45.03 km^{2} (17.39 sq mi)
- Elevation: 188 m (617 ft)
- Highest elevation: 688 m (2,257 ft)
- Lowest elevation: 0 m (0 ft)

Population (2024 census)
  - Total: 25,318
  - Density: 562.2/km^{2} (1,456/sq mi)
  - Households: 6,174

Economy
  - Income class: 3rd municipal income class
  - Poverty incidence: 14.64% (2023)
  - Revenue: ₱ 147.1 million (2024)
  - Assets: ₱ 274.5 million (2024)
  - Expenditure: ₱ 56.19 million (2024)
  - Liabilities: ₱ 66.83 million (2024)

Service provider
  - Electricity: First Laguna Electric Cooperative (FLECO)
- Time zone: UTC+8 (PST)
- ZIP code: 4018
- PSGC: 0403421000
- IDD : area code: +63 (0)49
- Native languages: Tagalog

Pangil, officially the Municipality of Pangil (Tagalog: Bayan ng Pangil), is a municipality in the province of Laguna, Philippines. According to the 2024 census, it has a population of 25,318 people.

== Etymology ==
According to the paper “Alamat ng Pangil, Laguna” by Santiago T. Adre, there are three commonly cited theories regarding the origin of the name “Pangil.”

One theory suggests that the name was derived from the town’s geographic shape, which, when viewed from an elevated position, resembles the fang (pangil) of a wild boar. Another theory attributes the name to the early settlers known as the Panguilagan. Over time, the name was shortened to “Panguil,” a form commonly found in Spanish-era documents, as Spaniards had difficulty pronouncing the original term. A third theory links the name to a pre-Hispanic leader, Gat Paguil, whom the Spaniards encountered upon their arrival in the area.

During the American period, following the United States’ takeover of the Philippines in 1898, the name “Panguil” was standardized to its present form, “Pangil.”

== History ==
Pangil is one of the oldest settlements in Laguna, rich in Hispanic, American and Japanese history. Discovered artifacts of the 12th century Ming and Sung Dynasty were attributed to Chinese immigrants and traders who settled in this place then. According to oral literature, the first leader of the area, which now encompasses four separate towns, was Gat Pangil, who united four ancient settlements to establish a Tagalog kingdom in the area. During the Hispanic period, Pangil became a staging ground of the Spanish missionaries in Christian Evangelization drive in 1578 in the present-day provinces of Rizal, Laguna and Quezon (then known as Tayabas), until it gained recognition as a town through the Franciscan friars in the 1579.

=== King Charles III in Pangil ===
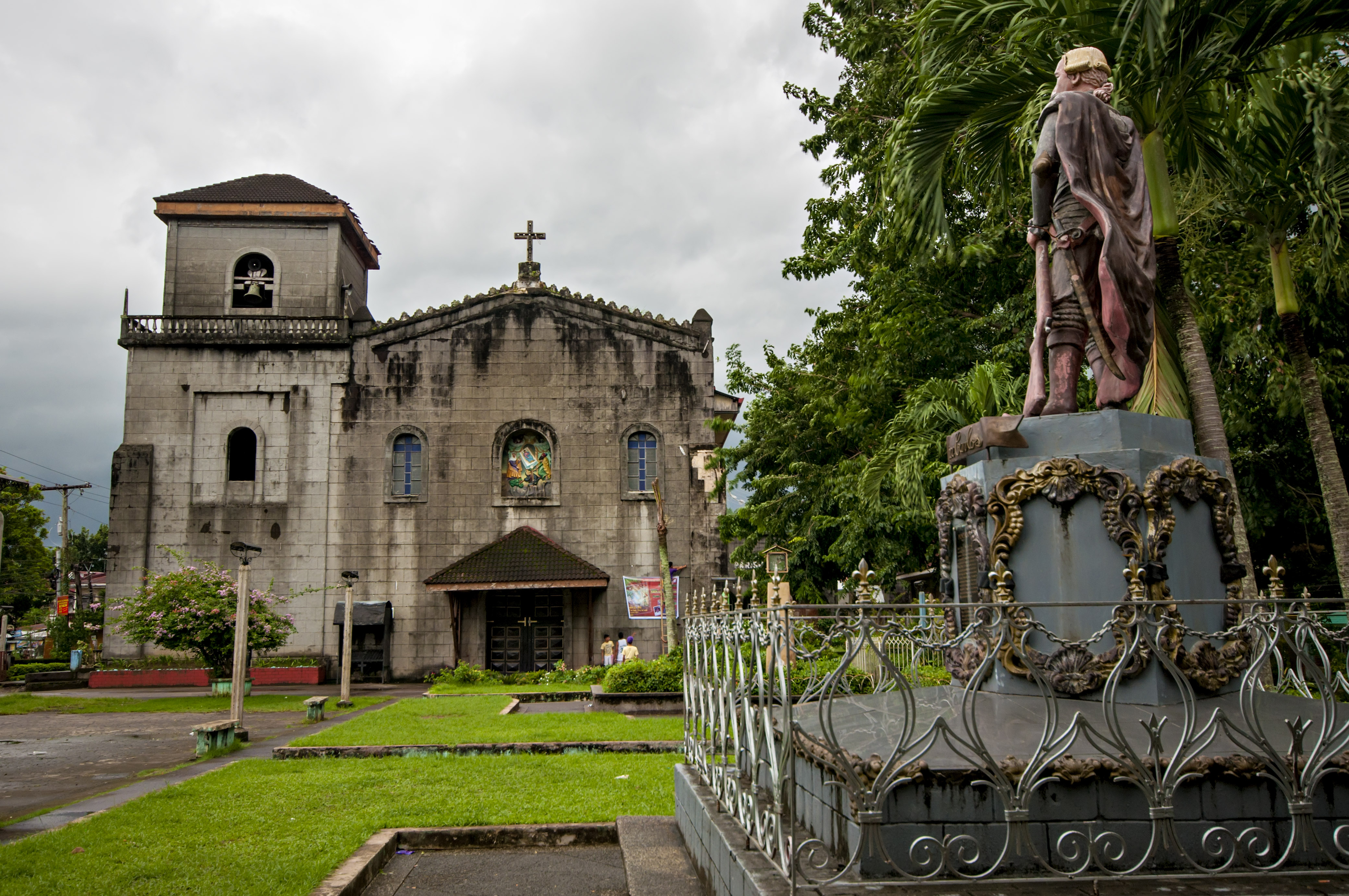
The Nuestra Señora de la Natividad Parish Church with the statue of King Charles III

One of the revered myths in the town of Pangil is the belief that in 1724, Prince Carlos, the son of King Philip V of Spain, was banished from his country and was sent to the Philippines. The young prince stayed in the town for three years and resided with the Franciscans in the adjoining convent of the Paroquia del Nuestra Señora de la Natividad Church considered then as the biggest in Laguna. The prince was a known hunter and he enjoyed his stay in the Sierra Madre mountain range that was known as a good hunting ground for wild animals and fowls. He was also very fond of the creek that branched out from the Pangil River and now called as the Bambang Hari or King's Canal.

By 1728, the King lifted the ban on the Prince and ordered the latter to return to their kingdom. With his ascension to the throne of Spain as King Charles III, he ordered his emissaries to send the statue of Nuestra Seńora de la O (Our Lady of Expectation) and the statue of Santo Nińo de la O (Holy Child of Expectation) as a sign of gratitude and appreciation to the Pangilenians for the hospitality and kindness that was accorded to him. Although this story is a source of pride among the Pangilenos, there is nothing in the historical records of the archives of the Franciscan Province in the Philippines or the Archdiocese of Manila, or the Ministerio del Ultramar in Madrid that could corroborate this folk history.

=== Post-Spanish era ===
In 1903, Pangil, alongside Famy, was absorbed into the town of Siniloan by virtue of Act No. 939. It was later separated from Siniloan to become a present-day municipality.

== Geography ==
This town is separated by the Laguna de Bay from each other. Pangil is 23 kilometers (14 mi) from Santa Cruz, 110 kilometers (68 mi) from Manila, and 71 kilometers (44 mi) from Lucena.

=== Barangays ===
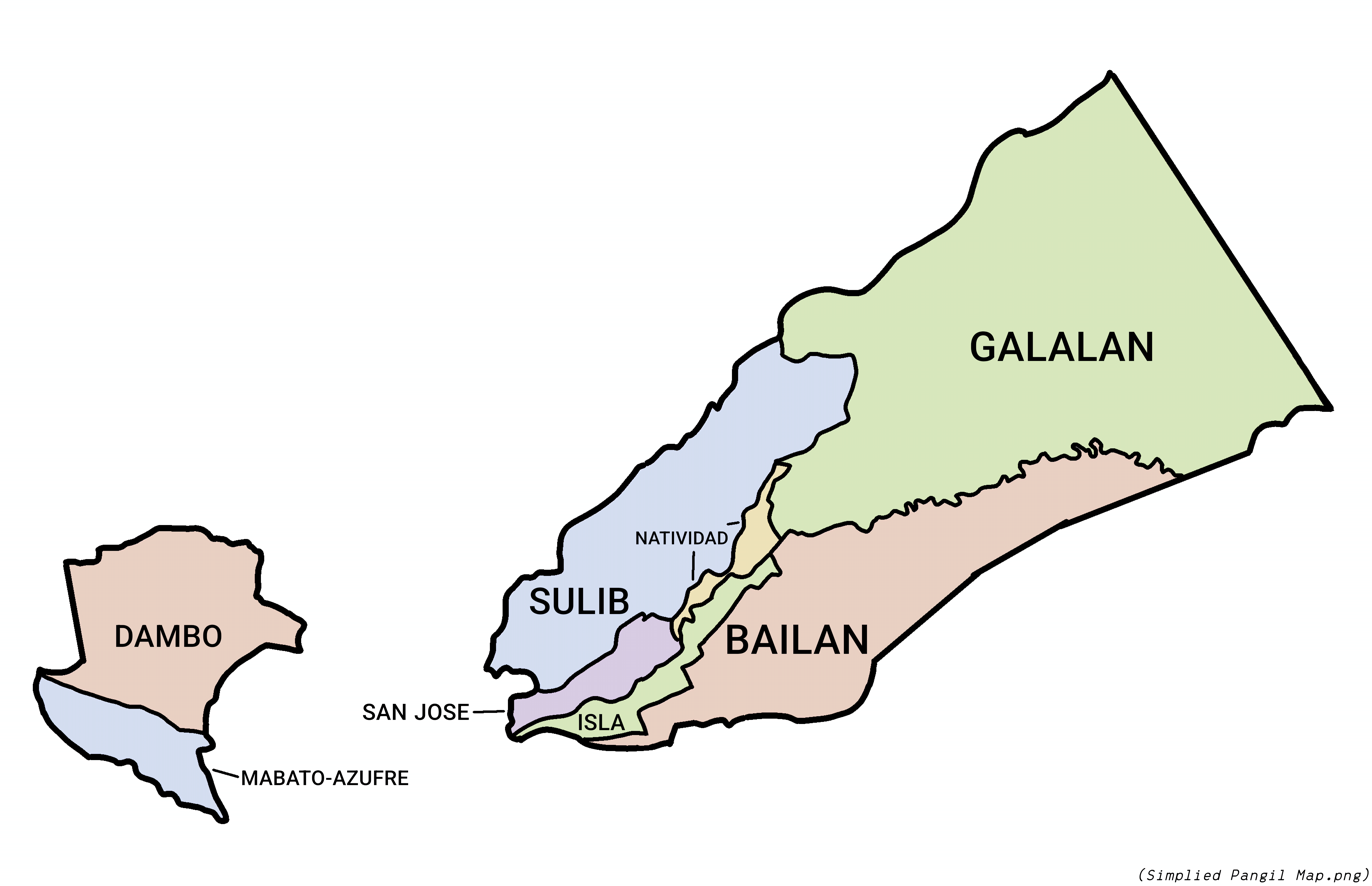
Barangay map of Pangil from East and West Bank

Pangil is politically subdivided into 8 barangays, as indicated in the matrix below. Each barangay consists of puroks and some have sitios.

PSGC	Barangay	Population			±% p.a.	
		2024		2010		
0403421001	Balian	25.4%	6,435	5,795	▴	0.73%
0403421002	Dambo	9.2%	2,338	1,898	▴	1.46%
0403421003	Galalan	4.6%	1,161	849	▴	2.19%
0403421004	Isla (Poblacion)	11.4%	2,875	2,923	▾	−0.11%
0403421005	Mabato-Azufre	6.2%	1,562	1,398	▴	0.77%
0403421006	Natividad (Poblacion)	10.1%	2,567	2,771	▾	−0.53%
0403421007	San Jose (Poblacion)	5.2%	1,314	1,486	▾	−0.85%
0403421008	Sulib (Poblacion)	26.8%	6,774	6,081	▴	0.75%
	Total		25,318	23,200	▴	0.61%

=== Climate ===
Climate data for Pangil, Laguna
Month	Jan	Feb	Mar	Apr	May	Jun	Jul	Aug	Sep	Oct	Nov	Dec	Year
Mean daily maximum °C (°F)	26 (79)	27 (81)	29 (84)	31 (88)	31 (88)	30 (86)	29 (84)	29 (84)	29 (84)	29 (84)	28 (82)	26 (79)	29 (84)
Mean daily minimum °C (°F)	22 (72)	22 (72)	22 (72)	23 (73)	24 (75)	25 (77)	24 (75)	24 (75)	24 (75)	24 (75)	24 (75)	23 (73)	23 (74)
Average precipitation mm (inches)	58 (2.3)	41 (1.6)	32 (1.3)	29 (1.1)	91 (3.6)	143 (5.6)	181 (7.1)	162 (6.4)	172 (6.8)	164 (6.5)	113 (4.4)	121 (4.8)	1,307 (51.5)
Average rainy days	13.4	9.3	9.1	9.8	19.1	22.9	26.6	24.9	25.0	21.4	16.5	16.5	214.5
Source: Meteoblue

== Demographics ==
Population census of Pangil
Year	Pop.	±% p.a.
1903	2,200	—
1918	4,424	+4.77%
1939	3,889	−0.61%
1948	4,156	+0.74%
1960	5,364	+2.15%
1970	8,118	+4.23%
1975	9,263	+2.68%
1980	10,519	+2.57%
1990	15,212	+3.76%
1995	17,664	+2.84%
2000	20,698	+3.46%
2007	23,421	+1.72%
2010	23,201	−0.34%
2015	24,274	+0.86%
2020	25,026	+0.64%
2024	25,318	+0.28%
Source: Philippine Statistics Authority

In the 2024 census, the population of Pangil was 25,318 people, with a density of 560 inhabitants per square kilometer or 1,500 inhabitants per square mile.

== Economy ==
Poverty incidence of Pangil (%)

Source: Philippine Statistics Authority

== Government ==
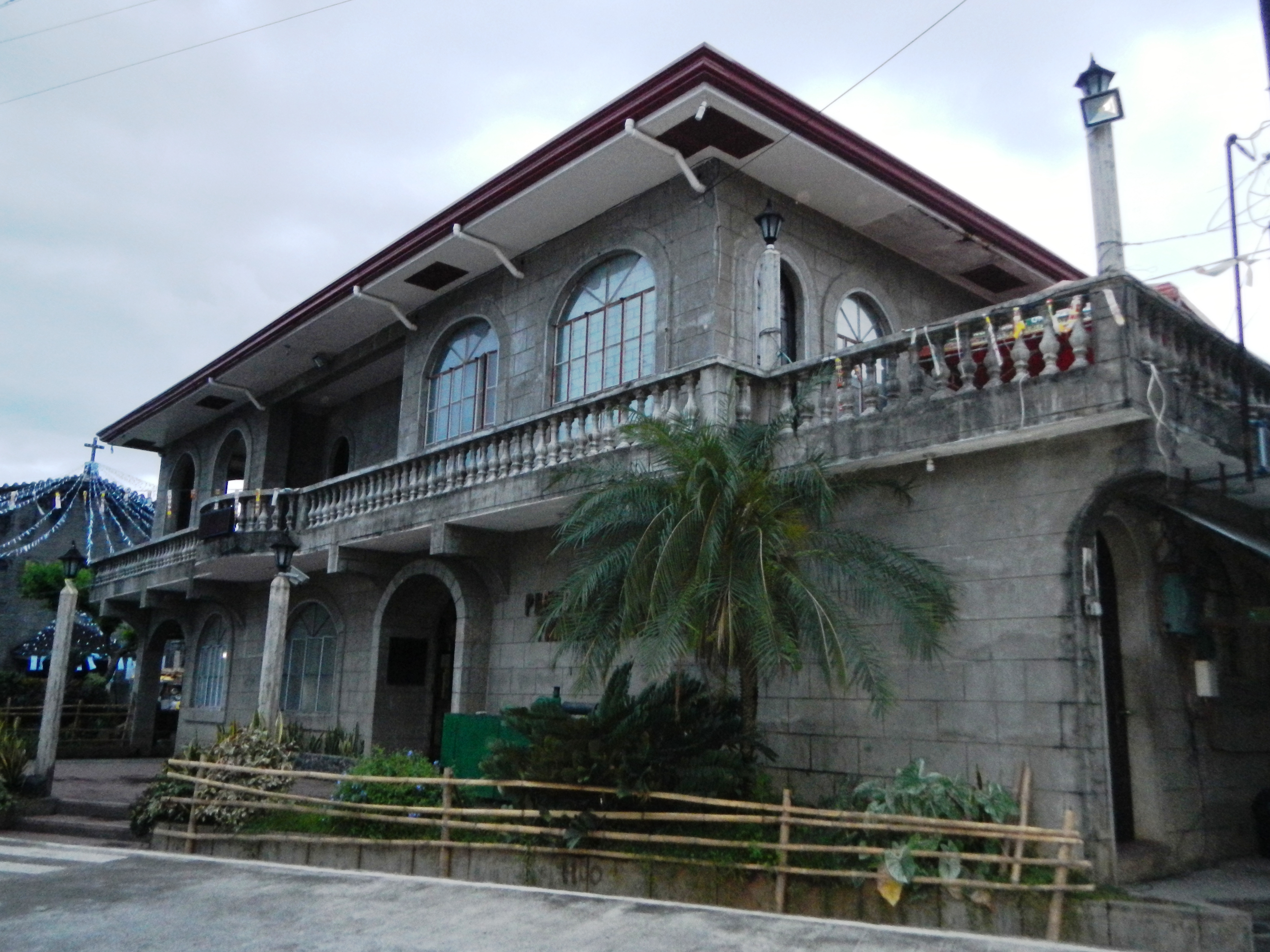
Pangil Town Hall

=== List of local chief executives ===
Under the American Civil Government

- 1900-1905 Antonio A. Fabricante
- 1906-1907 Pedro Dalena
- 1908-1909 Agustin Martinez
- 1910-1912 Roman Maulawin
- 1913-1919 Engracio Balita
- 1920-1922 Victor Acapulco
- 1923-1925 Antonio Aclan
- 1926-1928 Abraham de Guia
- 1929-1934 Santiago T. Adre

During the Commonwealth Period

- 1935-1937 Canuto Galvez
- 1938-1940 Esteban C. Icarangal

During World War II

- 1941-1945 Zoilo Martinez Pajarillo

During the post- war period

- 1946-1947 Santiago T. Adre
- 1948-1955 Alfredo M. Fabricante
- 1956-1959 Pastor de Ramos
- 1960-1963 Geminiano C. Gualberto

During the Marcos dictatorship

- 1964-1967 Cristobal T. Demery
- 1968-1971 Geminiano C. Gualberto
- 1972-1979 Pedro D. Aritao

During the Contemporary Period

- 1980-1992 Dominador V. Manzana
- 1992-1995 Valentin B. Santa Ana
- 1995-2004 Sergio C. Manzana
- 2004-2013 Juanita C. Manzana
- 2013-2016 Jovit Reyes
- 2016-2019 Oscar Rafanan
- 2019-2020 Jovit Reyes
- 2020–present Gerald A. Aritao

== Education ==
The Pangil-Pakil Schools District Office governs all educational institutions within the municipality. It oversees the management and operations of all private and public, from primary to secondary schools.

=== Primary and elementary schools ===
- Dambo Elementary School
- Galalan Elementary School
- J. Fernandez Y Zoril (Asufre) Elementary School
- Pangil Elementary School
- Saray Elementary School
- Shama Institute of Little Lamb Academy
- Sulib Elementary School
- Victor O. De Guia, Jr. Memorial Elementary School (Balian Bo. School)

=== Secondary schools ===
- Balian Integrated National High School

=== Higher educational institution ===
- Balian Community College
- St. Peter of Alcantara College

== Notable people ==
- Leo M. Drona – Catholic Bishop. Second Bishop of the Roman Catholic Diocese of San Jose (Nueva Ecija) and Third Bishop of the Roman Catholic Diocese of San Pablo, Laguna.
- Kidlat Tahimik - the Father of Indie Films and recognized as National Artist of the Philippines for Film.

== Gallery ==
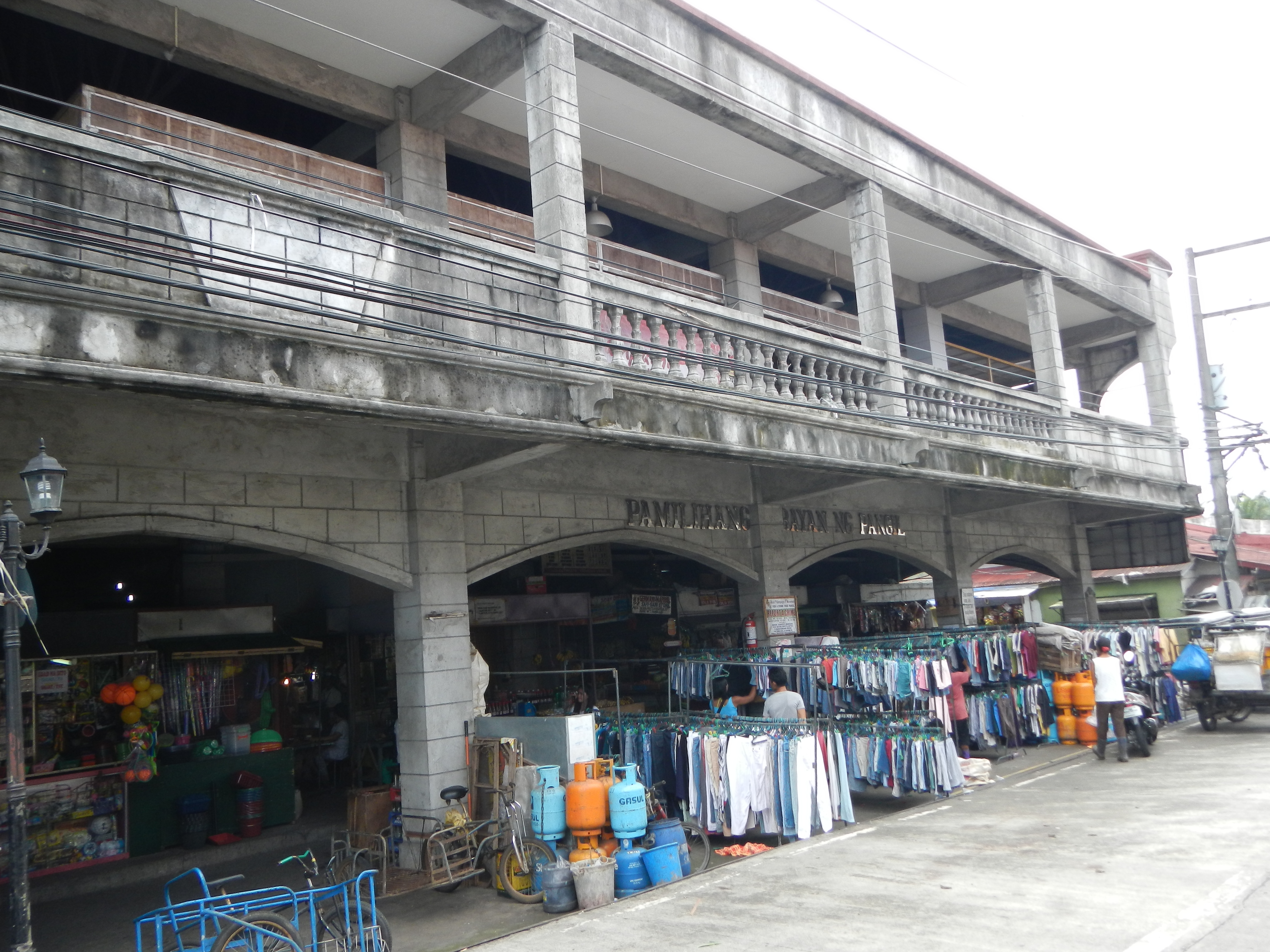
Public market

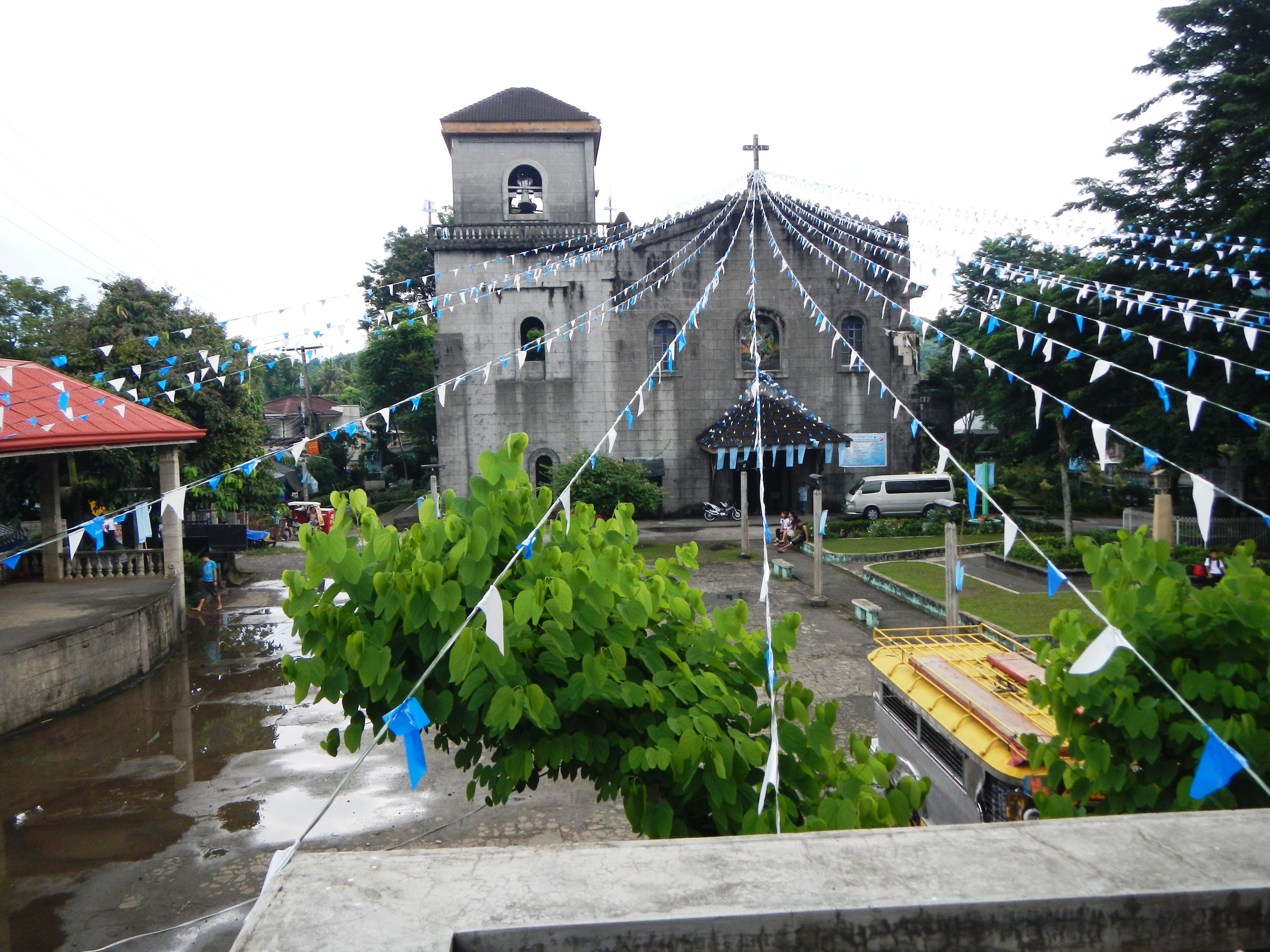
Church and plaza

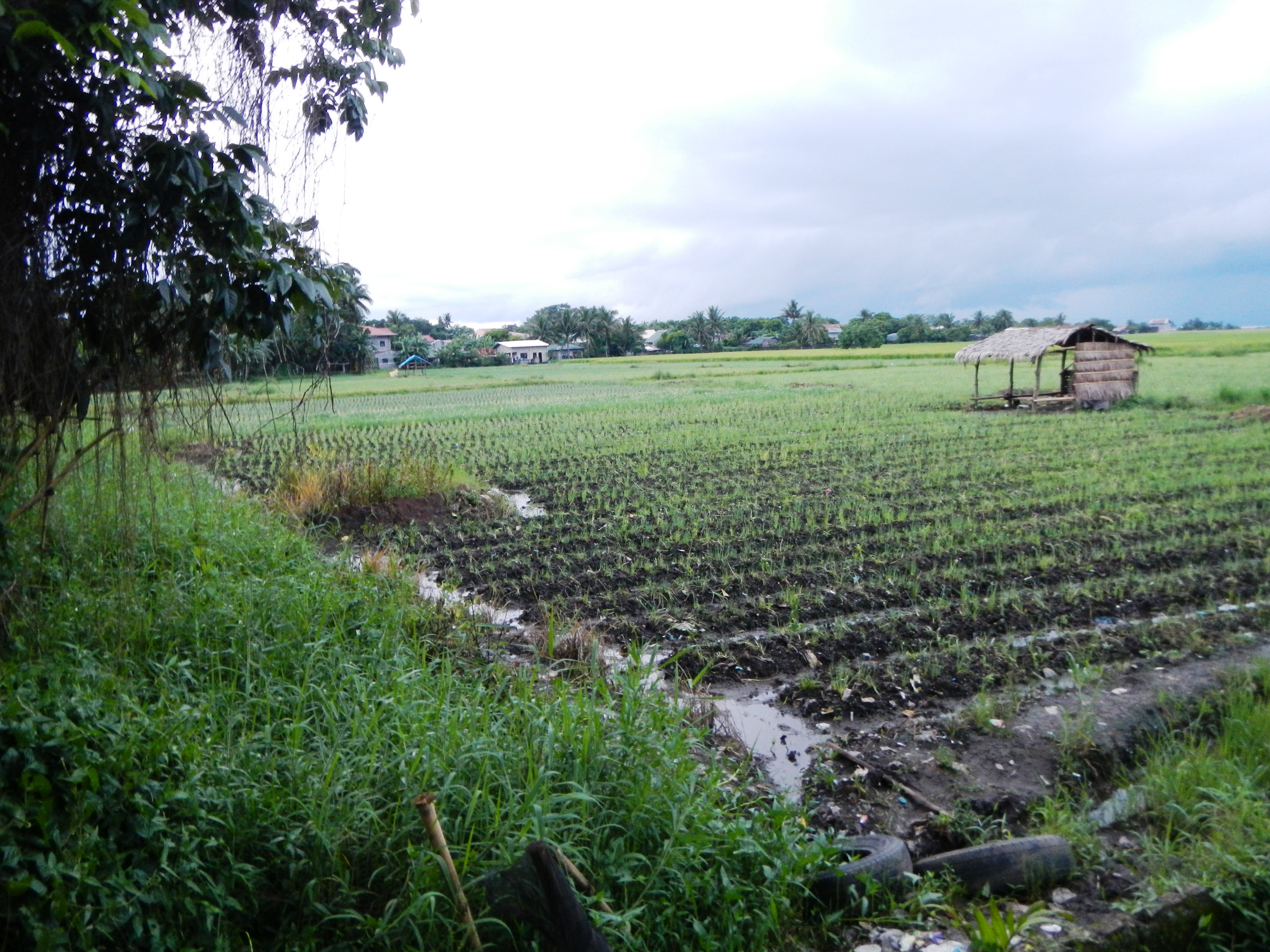
Rice field at Pangil
