= List of barangays in Laguna (province) =

The province of Laguna has 681 barangays comprising its 24 towns and 6 cities.

== Barangays ==
Most populous in its respective city/town (as of 2020)

Barangay	Population						City or Town
Barangay	2020	2010	2007	2000	1995	1990	City or Town
Abo	1,187	991	903	783	712	657	Nagcarlan
Acevida	1,294	1,406	1,513	1,200	1,210	1,209	Siniloan
Adia	1,120	1,002	920	779	615	570	Santa Maria
Alibungbungan	1,971	1,737	1,604	1,248	989	895	Nagcarlan
Alipit	375	320	247	210	151	139	Magdalena
Alipit	439	369	363	346	285	283	Santa Cruz
Alumbrado	1,099	887	958	698	569	378	Nagcarlan
Amonoy	150	408	355	196	55	115	Majayjay
Amuyong	636	581	531	439	343	360	Mabitac
Anglas	427	302	269	209	138	73	Cavinti
Anibong	415	280	283	237	205	218	Pagsanjan
Anos	8,815	7,446	7,264	7,105	5,786	5,313	Los Baños
Antipolo	2,999	2,396	2,398	2,077	1,830	1,415	Rizal
Aplaya	3,303	3,114	3,253	2,953	2,568	2,610	Pila
Aplaya	15,858	14,172	11,659	11,026	9,957	8,727	Santa Rosa
Asana (Poblacion)	531	467	462	442	451	503	Famy
Atisan	1,271	1,225	1,193	1,060	936	908	San Pablo
Baanan	971	758	699	697	656	651	Magdalena
Baclaran	14,606	12,192	12,683	6,430	2,315	1,883	Cabuyao
Bacong-Sigsigan	142	198	141	112	152	174	Famy
Bagong Anyo (Poblacion)	1,128	1,171	1,343	1,251	1,296	1,366	Liliw
Bagong Bayan II-A (Poblacion)	6,471	5,639	6,123	5,181	2,509	2,343	San Pablo
Bagong Kalsada	3,892	3,306	2,090	2,202	1,884	1,410	Calamba
Bagong Pag-Asa (Poblacion)	325	339	402	392	452	384	Famy
Bagong Pag-Asa (Poblacion)	636	559	582	468	465	438	Siniloan
Bagong Pook	5,208	3,165	2,752	2,376	2,065	1,787	Pila
Bagong Pook	2,310	2,239	2,314	2,373	2,454	1,999	Santa Maria
Bagong Pook VI-C (Poblacion)	1,859	1,921	2,131	2,183	1,931	2,280	San Pablo
Bagong Silang	707	577	627	584	661	576	Los Baños
Bagong Silang	2,963	2,755	2,908	2,904	2,511	2,229	Lumban
Bagong Silang	5,736	6,343	5,400	4,838	4,320	2,612	San Pedro
Bagumbarangay (Poblacion)	118	216	195	208	259	284	Siniloan
Bagumbayan	13,364	9,614	7,657	7,058	6,365	5,166	Santa Cruz
Bagumbayan	2,083	1,584	1,688	1,398	1,212	1,311	Santa Maria
Bagumbayan (Poblacion)	5,503	4,556	4,179	3,733	3,182	3,052	Paete
Bakia	512	584	488	472	424	364	Majayjay
Balanac	1,210	892	649	653	546	395	Magdalena
Balanac	51	250	247	184	31	14	Majayjay
Balayhangin	5,570	5,294	5,503	4,751	4,041	3,568	Calauan
Balayong	73	246	153	176	44	22	Majayjay
Balayong	331	290	234	108	102	70	Nagcarlan
Balian	6,435	5,795	5,740	4,934	4,435	3,825	Pangil
Balibago	21,566	14,968	13,575	12,444	9,054	6,730	Santa Rosa
Balimbing	433	413	396	353	301	248	Nagcarlan
Balimbingan (Poblacion)	1,052	1,131	1,050	1,191	1,107	1,002	Lumban
Balinacon	646	643	527	476	330	231	Nagcarlan
Balitoc	729	609	677	404	334	266	Famy
Balubad	2,131	1,582	1,390	1,063	888	594	Lumban
Bambang	7,638	7,021	6,787	5,834	4,617	4,222	Los Baños
Bambang	2,172	1,922	2,004	1,568	1,286	894	Nagcarlan
Banaba (Poblacion)	646	592	522	527	540	481	Famy
Banago	2,981	2,466	2,114	1,699	1,432	1,151	Nagcarlan
Banay-Banay	34,260	21,934	17,419	9,846	7,695	4,598	Cabuyao
Bañadero	12,647	7,116	5,309	3,647	3,018	2,315	Calamba
Banca-Banca	1,394	1,383	1,345	1,201	976	683	Nagcarlan
Banca-Banca	3,905	3,032	2,999	2,613	2,192	1,717	Victoria
Bangco	175	95	129	164	112	–	Cavinti
Bangcuro	584	500	459	395	292	218	Nagcarlan
Bangkusay (Poblacion)	474	542	571	585	656	703	Paete
Bangyas	2,931	2,946	2,726	2,156	1,642	1,380	Calauan
Banilad	204	240	205	156	58	110	Majayjay
Banilad	666	581	491	416	256	194	Nagcarlan
Banilan	1,843	1,708	1,543	1,384	1,121	976	Pakil
Banlic	20,646	12,675	9,707	8,232	5,999	4,572	Cabuyao
Banlic	18,335	12,780	12,626	10,732	6,885	2,009	Calamba
Baño (Poblacion)	593	485	494	370	326	432	Pakil
Banti	82	410	298	306	85	87	Majayjay
Barandal	18,076	4,625	2,994	1,565	500	541	Calamba
Barangay 1 (Poblacion)	5,823	6,569	6,415	5,179	5,407	4,872	Calamba
Barangay 2 (Poblacion)	10,627	8,005	6,764	4,938	4,463	4,654	Calamba
Barangay 3 (Poblacion)	4,537	4,408	5,111	4,264	3,991	4,055	Calamba
Barangay 4 (Poblacion)	3,301	3,237	2,989	3,068	2,830	2,629	Calamba
Barangay 5 (Poblacion)	5,858	6,285	5,406	3,900	3,630	3,614	Calamba
Barangay 6 (Poblacion)	1,693	2,447	2,309	2,220	2,278	2,356	Calamba
Barangay 7 (Poblacion)	2,357	2,519	2,706	2,425	2,048	1,468	Calamba
Barangay Dos (Poblacion)	1,573	1,840	1,947	2,197	1,905	1,837	Cabuyao
Barangay I (Poblacion)	3,796	2,780	2,830	2,699	2,253	1,973	Alaminos
Barangay I (Poblacion)	1,485	1,551	1,642	1,325	1,624	1,973	Pagsanjan
Barangay I (Poblacion)	1,247	1,532	1,514	1,440	1,393	1,293	Santa Cruz
Barangay I (Poblacion)	1,219	838	1,034	849	769	658	Santa Maria
Barangay I-A (Poblacion)	577	546	544	621	729	674	San Pablo
Barangay I-B (Poblacion)	4,002	4,523	5,183	5,086	5,217	3,758	San Pablo
Barangay II (Poblacion)	2,220	2,634	2,245	1,893	1,887	1,451	Alaminos
Barangay II (Poblacion)	1,941	1,924	1,961	2,341	2,592	2,158	Pagsanjan
Barangay II (Poblacion)	1,280	1,641	1,568	1,736	1,855	1,882	Santa Cruz
Barangay II (Poblacion)	627	642	706	897	882	730	Santa Maria
Barangay II-A (Poblacion)	2,896	2,676	2,697	2,789	–	–	San Pablo
Barangay II-B (Poblacion)	1,853	2,255	2,173	2,160	2,155	2,066	San Pablo
Barangay II-C (Poblacion)	1,056	1,141	1,281	1,333	1,416	1,310	San Pablo
Barangay II-D (Poblacion)	979	1,219	1,400	1,392	1,451	1,376	San Pablo
Barangay II-E (Poblacion)	2,148	2,851	3,016	3,439	3,582	3,805	San Pablo
Barangay II-F (Poblacion)	2,185	2,106	2,106	1,768	1,763	1,509	San Pablo
Barangay III (Poblacion)	2,741	2,629	2,304	2,259	1,857	1,732	Alaminos
Barangay III (Poblacion)	434	669	596	759	750	1,013	Santa Cruz
Barangay III (Poblacion)	812	836	934	870	976	897	Santa Maria
Barangay III-A (Poblacion)	217	401	250	306	309	518	San Pablo
Barangay III-B (Poblacion)	891	893	877	1,060	1,238	959	San Pablo
Barangay III-C (Poblacion)	2,773	2,940	2,819	3,139	2,926	2,696	San Pablo
Barangay III-D (Poblacion)	1,231	1,310	1,512	1,723	1,710	1,544	San Pablo
Barangay III-E (Poblacion)	591	626	649	643	633	553	San Pablo
Barangay III-F (Poblacion)	213	308	258	351	401	371	San Pablo
Barangay IV (Poblacion)	3,254	3,127	3,026	2,602	2,183	1,952	Alaminos
Barangay IV (Poblacion)	977	1,202	1,268	1,429	1,595	1,706	Santa Cruz
Barangay IV (Poblacion)	504	500	609	669	713	683	Santa Maria
Barangay IV-A (Poblacion)	720	782	716	1,091	989	1,101	San Pablo
Barangay IV-B (Poblacion)	845	463	398	606	616	549	San Pablo
Barangay IV-C (Poblacion)	584	820	683	917	965	954	San Pablo
Barangay Tres (Poblacion)	4,274	2,846	3,153	2,675	2,259	2,285	Cabuyao
Barangay Uno (Poblacion)	3,690	2,839	2,589	2,702	2,364	2,437	Cabuyao
Barangay V (Poblacion)	388	681	652	683	1,003	1,141	Santa Cruz
Barangay V-A (Poblacion)	461	485	599	822	882	821	San Pablo
Barangay V-B (Poblacion)	845	911	667	688	721	737	San Pablo
Barangay V-C (Poblacion)	313	473	473	548	660	699	San Pablo
Barangay V-D (Poblacion)	269	407	508	495	493	606	San Pablo
Barangay VI-A (Poblacion)	529	497	596	582	552	619	San Pablo
Barangay VI-B (Poblacion)	880	862	831	715	535	779	San Pablo
Barangay VI-D (Poblacion)	1,531	1,931	1,679	2,001	1,977	1,874	San Pablo
Barangay VI-E (Poblacion)	2,617	2,613	2,519	2,359	2,256	2,500	San Pablo
Barangay VII-A (Poblacion)	1,432	1,705	1,693	1,640	1,733	1,901	San Pablo
Barangay VII-B (Poblacion)	620	521	743	711	850	1,079	San Pablo
Barangay VII-C (Poblacion)	85	167	142	168	215	339	San Pablo
Barangay VII-D (Poblacion)	135	80	86	87	129	228	San Pablo
Barangay VII-E (Poblacion)	177	154	251	216	223	339	San Pablo
Barangay Zone I (Poblacion)	561	484	511	406	396	280	Luisiana
Barangay Zone II (Poblacion)	294	367	435	288	424	351	Luisiana
Barangay Zone III (Poblacion)	494	332	456	350	403	436	Luisiana
Barangay Zone IV (Poblacion)	512	520	521	487	470	471	Luisiana
Barangay Zone V (Poblacion)	827	848	809	893	873	775	Luisiana
Barangay Zone VI (Poblacion)	531	631	578	579	543	526	Luisiana
Barangay Zone VII (Poblacion)	423	437	510	518	479	562	Luisiana
Barangay Zone VIII (Poblacion)	299	413	331	381	380	525	Luisiana
Batino	1,616	1,249	1,295	665	302	276	Calamba
Batong Malake	12,578	11,884	13,448	11,772	11,902	12,145	Los Baños
Batuhan	2,974	2,341	1,189	1,577	1,430	1,096	Famy
Bautista	3,208	2,444	2,375	2,106	1,611	1,410	San Pablo
Bayanihan (Poblacion)	538	447	505	492	475	429	Mabitac
Bayaquitos	108	126	40	125	53	38	Nagcarlan
Bayate	227	210	114	136	85	32	Liliw
Baybayin (Poblacion)	1,466	1,307	1,538	1,464	1,604	1,407	Los Baños
Bayog	11,613	9,671	8,675	6,882	5,690	5,161	Los Baños
Bigaa	13,665	10,051	8,649	7,515	5,973	5,805	Cabuyao
Biñan	6,434	5,235	4,655	3,604	2,611	1,882	Pagsanjan
Biñan (Poblacion)	7,103	3,750	1,099	432	504	310	Biñan
Bitaoy	196	232	200	117	123	96	Majayjay
Bitin	6,888	6,141	5,275	4,934	3,676	3,012	Bay
Bongkol	775	605	682	548	442	374	Liliw
Botocan	931	1,083	951	793	755	698	Majayjay
Buboy	1,576	1,256	1,236	987	821	661	Nagcarlan
Buboy	1,804	1,548	1,453	1,199	937	923	Pagsanjan
Bubukal	305	228	185	141	142	97	Liliw
Bubukal	7,131	5,668	5,507	4,578	3,601	3,067	Santa Cruz
Bubukal	1,267	1,022	889	866	908	877	Santa Maria
Bubuyan	3,193	1,666	1,466	1,204	952	864	Calamba
Bucal	14,289	11,346	12,171	10,002	7,131	6,100	Calamba
Bucal	491	961	612	481	355	281	Magdalena
Buenavista	2,462	1,720	1,603	1,609	1,466	1,328	Magdalena
Buenavista	486	241	201	158	132	85	Nagcarlan
Buhanginan	391	334	256	175	140	91	Nagcarlan
Buhay	1,110	1,089	1,031	797	713	517	Siniloan
Bukal	1,263	1,055	1,145	1,011	809	733	Cavinti
Bukal	745	521	558	443	177	87	Majayjay
Bukal	796	728	666	576	494	350	Nagcarlan
Bukal	767	630	591	388	278	147	Pila
Bulajo	529	449	441	408	336	271	Cavinti
Bulihan	2,836	2,236	2,124	1,466	1,277	956	Famy
Bulilan Norte (Poblacion)	2,314	2,194	2,112	1,672	1,520	1,480	Pila
Bulilan Sur (Poblacion)	3,481	3,273	3,271	2,873	2,551	2,116	Pila
Bunga	407	321	269	220	188	161	Nagcarlan
Bungahan	3,812	1,709	1,848	876	469	394	Biñan
Bunggo	4,437	3,809	3,650	2,864	1,796	1,550	Calamba
Bungkol	777	762	734	631	536	393	Magdalena
Buo	132	167	194	185	69	51	Magdalena
Burgos	147	311	315	121	114	63	Majayjay
Burgos (Poblacion)	2,203	2,204	2,264	1,659	1,414	973	Pakil
Burlungan	729	658	571	550	463	368	Magdalena
Burol	3,551	1,783	1,722	1,372	1,156	1,035	Calamba
Burol	43	351	263	259	33	11	Majayjay
Butong	14,764	12,360	12,274	4,082	2,814	2,358	Cabuyao
Caballero (Poblacion)	678	691	651	516	554	490	Famy
Cabanbanan	5,907	4,968	4,349	3,829	3,199	2,637	Pagsanjan
Cabooan	1,981	1,716	1,629	1,269	911	560	Santa Maria
Cabuyao	122	90	74	68	73	32	Liliw
Cabuyew	268	291	287	205	169	105	Nagcarlan
Caingin	24,481	18,608	12,230	9,491	7,478	6,310	Santa Rosa
Calangay	1,479	1,043	1,099	1,097	834	877	Santa Maria
Calendola	3,797	3,835	3,815	3,255	3,524	3,268	San Pedro
Calios	10,082	8,594	7,427	6,153	6,734	4,971	Santa Cruz
Caliraya	1,130	998	923	693	569	539	Lumban
Calo	4,100	3,576	3,819	3,171	2,614	2,269	Bay
Calumpang	3,729	3,589	2,902	2,916	2,523	2,264	Liliw
Calumpang	1,022	825	796	750	792	618	Nagcarlan
Calumpang (Poblacion)	362	452	514	406	519	451	Famy
Calusiche	991	912	720	449	329	247	Pagsanjan
Camaligan	1,345	978	918	639	405	439	Calamba
Cambuja	2,139	1,532	1,540	1,416	932	1,148	Santa Maria
Canlalay	20,354	19,238	19,622	18,471	17,680	14,127	Biñan
Canlubang	60,292	54,655	54,602	45,294	34,484	20,112	Calamba
Cansuso	1,417	1,238	1,015	968	755	1,054	Cavinti
Casa Real	1,992	1,401	1,601	1,283	991	930	Pakil
Casile	4,240	3,427	3,586	2,492	1,425	1,963	Biñan
Casile	3,619	2,128	1,555	1,249	966	980	Cabuyao
Casinsin	2,192	1,677	1,500	1,427	1,164	1,159	Pakil
Chrysanthemum	12,433	–	–	–	–	–	San Pedro
Cigaras	3,593	2,847	2,332	2,378	1,944	1,581	Magdalena
Concepcion	4,298	3,355	2,928	1,658	1,156	837	Lumban
Concepcion	1,211	1,114	931	540	409	430	Pila
Concepcion	8,292	7,928	6,880	6,514	6,188	5,520	San Pablo
Coralan	2,647	2,393	2,063	1,872	1,753	1,563	Santa Maria
Coralao	495	519	386	416	273	170	Majayjay
Cuebang Bato	289	83	123	102	50	57	Famy
Cueva	1,117	717	733	492	641	633	Santa Maria
Culoy	111	64	66	86	76	17	Liliw
Cuyab	21,422	20,964	20,970	17,266	14,585	10,416	San Pedro
Dagatan	526	472	406	323	476	463	Liliw
Damayan (Poblacion)	813	696	654	659	661	575	Famy
Dambo	2,338	1,897	1,846	1,469	1,124	1,015	Pangil
Daniw	1,615	1,148	1,007	622	445	370	Victoria
Daniw (Danliw)	891	724	727	516	537	386	Liliw
Dayap	21,784	17,673	7,100	4,36	3,720	3,325	Calauan
De La Paz	32,841	29,568	31,304	24,650	19,583	18,947	Biñan
De La Paz	580	558	514	421	415	370	Luisiana
Del Carmen	1,186	1,089	1,013	990	824	815	Alaminos
Del Remedio	17,871	13,789	13,475	11,872	10,701	9,020	San Pablo
Diezmo	6,622	2,681	2,689	1,557	876	745	Cabuyao
Dila	6,762	5,167	4,987	3,698	3,091	2,972	Bay
Dila	39,496	27,059	30,080	21,632	14,574	3,976	Santa Rosa
Dingin	1,585	943	755	770	482	505	Pagsanjan
Dita	636	353	296	162	152	114	Liliw
Dita	34,650	20,600	20,857	13,058	11,224	9,180	Santa Rosa
Dolores	2,321	2,251	1,958	1,792	1,568	1,324	San Pablo
Don Jose	18,039	12,054	14,181	5,289	2,488	1,570	Santa Rosa
Dorado	265	773	667	622	538	600	Pakil
Duhat	1,830	1,468	1,527	1,224	1,108	1,184	Cavinti
Duhat	7,393	6,633	6,445	5,404	4,781	3,522	Santa Cruz
East Poblacion	657	672	689	673	691	665	Rizal
Entablado	167	172	116	205	199	75	Rizal
Ermita (Poblacion)	556	583	586	615	726	713	Paete
Estrella	8,025	4,413	5,146	4,729	3,396	2,697	San Pedro
Fatima	6,491	–	–	–	–	–	San Pedro
G. Redor (Poblacion)	239	674	888	593	734	489	Siniloan
G.S.I.S.	2,828	2,517	2,453	2,083	1,858	1,500	San Pedro
Gagalot	923	590	406	353	278	311	Majayjay
Galalan	1,161	849	1,035	852	633	611	Pangil
Ganado	6,463	3,952	3,518	2,381	1,113	501	Biñan
Gatid	10,000	8,910	7,820	7,443	6,511	5,754	Santa Cruz
Gen. Luna	1,294	1,360	1,664	1,624	1,655	1,593	Siniloan
Gonzales (Poblacion)	2,614	2,682	2,426	2,551	2,233	2,052	Pakil
Gulod	17,215	9,417	10,127	8,508	6,964	6,053	Cabuyao
Halang	8,582	6,829	6,442	5,591	5,742	3,750	Calamba
Halayhayin	129	65	46	97	190	89	Magdalena
Halayhayin	4,847	3,923	4,115	3,285	3,090	2,412	Siniloan
Hanggan	3,114	1,516	1,632	1,225	979	782	Calauan
Hornalan	2,053	1,397	1,302	970	760	704	Calamba
Ibaba	8,069	4,536	5,011	3,675	2,825	2,334	Santa Rosa
Ibaba del Norte (Poblacion)	3,108	3,024	3,015	2,740	2,286	2,176	Paete
Ibaba del Sur (Poblacion)	2,277	2,630	2,670	2,589	2,700	2,390	Paete
Ibabang Atingay	458	487	442	314	161	78	Magdalena
Ibabang Banga	835	636	676	384	482	364	Majayjay
Ibabang Bayucain	172	297	220	140	52	12	Majayjay
Ibabang Butnong	1,995	1,591	1,450	1,238	1,146	911	Magdalena
Ibabang Palina	147	118	84	30	48	26	Liliw
Ibabang San Roque	2,091	1,461	1,392	918	624	320	Liliw
Ibabang Sungi	216	177	280	213	67	65	Liliw
Ibabang Taykin	1,009	1,003	975	692	723	591	Liliw
Ilaya del Norte (Poblacion)	2,392	1,973	2,460	2,282	2,229	2,186	Paete
Ilaya del Sur (Poblacion)	1,571	1,390	1,825	1,814	1,902	1,861	Paete
Ilayang Atingay	339	334	318	234	192	163	Magdalena
Ilayang Banga	1,187	1,090	955	959	568	373	Majayjay
Ilayang Bayucain	84	224	180	164	157	55	Majayjay
Ilayang Butnong	1,562	1,049	1,045	920	746	610	Magdalena
Ilayang Palina	2,296	1,851	1,873	1,642	1,367	1,111	Liliw
Ilayang San Roque	253	150	66	104	33	18	Liliw
Ilayang Sungi	145	124	80	205	51	7	Liliw
Ilayang Taykin	2,981	2,589	2,368	1,486	1,097	669	Liliw
Ilog	349	230	275	200	82	63	Magdalena
Imok	2,534	1,793	1,449	1,136	1,023	1,134	Calauan
Inao-Awan	1,046	911	861	778	559	542	Cavinti
Inayapan	810	566	558	556	737	379	Santa Maria
Isabang	150	155	129	103	63	34	Majayjay
Isla (Poblacion)	2,875	2,923	2,793	2,435	1,881	1,319	Pangil
J. Rizal (Poblacion)	418	458	416	499	480	538	Siniloan
Jasaan	891	865	524	337	324	319	Santa Cruz
Jose Laurel, Sr.	691	432	365	384	422	506	Santa Maria
Jose Rizal	1,148	1,074	1,113	1,062	795	682	Santa Maria
Kabulusan	4,330	3,482	3,283	3,265	2,895	2,095	Pakil
Kanluran (Poblacion)	1,403	1,507	1,605	1,978	1,791	1,652	Calauan
Kanluran (Poblacion)	4,236	4,322	4,928	4,505	4,582	4,628	Santa Rosa
Kanluran Kabubuhayan	479	342	333	174	125	125	Nagcarlan
Kanluran Lazaan	611	640	568	529	594	495	Nagcarlan
Kanluran Talaongan	1,906	1,692	1,649	1,496	950	710	Cavinti
Kanlurang Bukal	4,423	4,315	3,611	2,822	2,733	2,366	Liliw
Kapatalan	1,939	1,253	959	325	335	167	Famy
Kapatalan	1,630	2,525	2,072	2,330	1,636	1,377	Siniloan
Kataypuanan	238	278	221	147	161	109	Famy
Kay-Anlog	20,487	2,665	2,195	1,377	1,119	962	Calamba
Kayhakat	1,387	1,106	1,068	1,056	923	776	Santa Maria
La Mesa	17,569	11,836	11,961	9,038	3,355	852	Calamba
Labangan	281	320	278	131	118	84	Nagcarlan
Labas	21,288	15,086	14,945	9,841	6,390	4,684	Santa Rosa
Labayo	148	116	228	287	158	–	Cavinti
Labuin	5,758	4,587	3,767	3,908	2,898	2,488	Pila
Labuin	4,588	4,578	3,690	3,251	2,733	2,281	Santa Cruz
Laguan	741	598	603	601	511	857	Liliw
Laguan	511	360	313	235	164	96	Rizal
Laguerta	5,461	1,766	1,752	1,245	964	896	Calamba
Laguio	797	549	410	371	171	199	Siniloan
Lagulo	353	228	300	143	58	29	Nagcarlan
Lalakay	4,234	4,253	3,903	4,003	3,480	3,216	Los Baños
Lambac	1,013	805	698	547	298	251	Pagsanjan
Lambac (Poblacion)	1,064	1,266	1,518	1,043	890	771	Mabitac
Lamot 1	2,933	2,461	2,413	1,881	1,768	1,620	Calauan
Lamot 2	7,504	6,162	5,979	5,267	3,791	3,195	Calauan
Landayan	33,235	28,052	26,428	21,384	17,420	14,323	San Pedro
Langgam	30,946	21,303	16,556	8,815	6,268	5,919	San Pedro
Langkiwa	39,526	25,709	2,713	1,771	1,179	936	Biñan
Laram	6,536	5,826	5,666	4,553	3,858	3,951	San Pedro
Lawa	12,245	9,169	6,132	5,203	3,085	2,075	Calamba
Lawaguin	488	383	356	394	373	339	Nagcarlan
Layasin	630	591	624	570	352	263	Cavinti
Layug	603	537	449	452	333	318	Cavinti
Layugan	316	192	222	296	186	165	Pagsanjan
Lecheria	10,907	8,391	6,722	6,219	5,453	4,241	Calamba
Lewin	2,391	2,120	2,339	1,798	849	912	Lumban
Libis ng Nayon (Poblacion)	1,106	837	771	566	616	411	Mabitac
Limao	4,641	4,168	3,477	2,844	2,631	2,076	Calauan
Linga	3,580	3,372	3,542	2,947	2,606	2,185	Pila
Lingga	6,193	5,817	6,322	5,077	3,827	4,290	Calamba
Liyang	198	284	221	154	110	65	Famy
Liyang	601	618	525	393	252	139	Siniloan
Llavac	1,428	1,943	1,765	1,188	1,113	602	Siniloan
Loma	13,068	6,769	6,980	1,601	1,079	925	Biñan
Longos	6,830	5,872	5,887	5,158	4,646	3,900	Kalayaan
Looc	26,819	14,524	12,444	7,903	5,558	5,267	Calamba
Lucong	1,181	985	1,100	904	795	593	Mabitac
Luquin	242	267	376	237	185	220	Liliw
Maahas	8,785	6,800	6,412	4,214	3,533	3,192	Los Baños
Maate	227	351	313	126	106	114	Famy
Mabacan	4,933	4,008	3,856	2,796	2,450	2,149	Calauan
Mabato	724	705	702	574	644	475	Calamba
Mabato-Azufre	1,562	1,398	1,522	1,475	1,360	993	Pangil
Macabling	20,406	17,049	14,638	8,626	6,159	4,490	Santa Rosa
Macasipac	584	555	588	514	450	484	Santa Maria
Macatad	3,034	2,161	2,101	1,952	1,362	1,060	Siniloan
Magdalo (Poblacion)	276	373	373	278	308	333	Famy
Magdapio	2,335	1,839	1,955	1,579	1,439	1,232	Pagsanjan
Magsaysay	12,793	11,554	11,673	9,302	6,715	4,846	San Pedro
Magsaysay	2,375	1,611	1,798	1,492	1,318	758	Siniloan
Maharlika	5,580	–	–	–	–	–	San Pedro
Mahipon	2,475	2,110	2,039	1,892	1,588	1,347	Cavinti
Maiit	304	201	188	180	147	116	Nagcarlan
Maitim	4,657	4,002	4,104	3,375	2,761	2,510	Bay
Majada Labas	10,571	5,172	4,606	2,822	2,405	1,945	Calamba
Makiling	12,508	7,510	7,100	5,130	4,326	3,382	Calamba
Malaban	35,989	28,550	30,636	28,024	18,768	21,826	Biñan
Malabo-Kalantukan	567	529	521	326	248	164	Liliw
Malaking Ambling	742	766	601	600	513	380	Magdalena
Malamig	6,243	2,929	2,853	1,089	231	131	Biñan
Malaya	2,355	2,124	2,080	1,632	1,210	965	Nagcarlan
Maligaya (Poblacion)	330	204	270	316	209	234	Mabitac
Malinao	588	444	413	372	305	295	Magdalena
Malinao	752	907	873	678	343	121	Majayjay
Malinao	1,451	1,237	1,250	1,088	940	899	Nagcarlan
Malinao	751	554	514	414	325	239	Santa Cruz
Malinta	6,531	6,258	5,913	5,646	5,184	4,256	Los Baños
Malitlit	27,433	22,223	20,713	14,936	8,114	3,690	Santa Rosa
Malusak (Poblacion)	2,906	5,253	4,840	1,963	2,089	2,222	Santa Rosa
Mamatid	61,085	50,213	37,166	10,020	7,052	6,513	Cabuyao
Mampalasan	13,586	6,086	5,374	2,681	1,955	1,364	Biñan
Manaol	1,707	1,652	1,595	1,345	1,251	1,168	Nagcarlan
Mapagong	7,254	4,942	3,618	3,676	2,503	2,322	Calamba
Maracta (Poblacion)	1,068	967	1,046	1,137	1,137	1,025	Lumban
Maravilla	687	508	468	423	376	294	Magdalena
Maravilla	1,303	1,216	1,376	1,105	932	644	Nagcarlan
Marinig	45,343	37,169	25,619	10,293	7,837	7,215	Cabuyao
Market Area (Poblacion)	16,017	13,086	13,984	9,585	7,284	4,660	Santa Rosa
Masapang	6,781	5,386	4,517	3,924	3,437	2,915	Victoria
Masaya	5,936	5,136	3,853	4,001	3,617	2,930	Bay
Masico	2,753	2,250	1,994	1,455	979	828	Pila
Masiit	4,977	4,121	4,276	3,892	2,927	2,790	Calauan
Masikap (Poblacion)	1,648	1,708	1,868	1,680	1,700	1,773	Liliw
Masikap (Poblacion)	454	507	535	587	509	465	Mabitac
Masili	3,827	3,585	2,859	2,742	2,548	2,024	Calamba
Masinao	851	717	700	659	515	480	Santa Maria
Maslun (Poblacion)	2,775	2,591	2,920	2,899	2,679	2,726	Liliw
Matalatala	4,352	3,197	2,571	2,101	1,644	1,881	Mabitac
Mataling-Ting	477	491	456	288	424	385	Santa Maria
Matikiw	818	552	638	506	430	331	Pakil
Maulawin	4,221	4,073	4,040	3,661	3,745	3,187	Pagsanjan
Maunong	4,395	2,105	1,917	1,501	1,231	1,109	Calamba
Mayapa	28,302	21,826	21,968	18,379	17,412	13,258	Calamba
Mayatba	454	376	381	281	2400	268	Famy
Mayatba	405	419	334	297	100	128	Siniloan
May-It	159	350	352	283	56	66	Majayjay
Mayondon	17,817	16,181	15,751	13,618	11,394	10,418	Los Baños
Maytalang I	3,986	3,649	3,610	2,716	2,109	1,872	Lumban
Maytalang II	1,088	980	846	497	486	434	Lumban
Maytoong (Poblacion)	1,809	1,790	1,914	2,010	2,093	2,190	Paete
Mendiola	5,978	5,091	4,992	4,270	4,102	3,655	Siniloan
Milagrosa (Tulo)	9,687	5,308	5,568	3,843	2,595	2,507	Calamba
Minayutan	293	190	191	156	142	218	Famy
Mojon	4,447	2,760	2,773	2,184	1,921	1,672	Liliw
Mojon	1,336	1,051	714	588	406	321	Pila
Munting Ambling	742	1,007	874	1,010	720	601	Magdalena
Munting Kawayan	744	615	712	565	259	185	Majayjay
Nagcalbang	194	105	242	140	37	13	Nagcarlan
Nanguma	2,508	2,513	2,321	1,768	1,677	1,361	Mabitac
Nanhaya (Poblacion)	7,275	6,856	7,021	6,693	6,115	5,566	Victoria
Narra	2,297	2,100	1,930	1,754	1,587	–	San Pedro
Natividad (Poblacion)	2,567	2,771	2,661	2,206	1,961	1,951	Pangil
Niugan	38,576	26,807	21,993	7,172	5,980	5,792	Cabuyao
Novaliches	889	794	629	531	203	336	Liliw
Nueva	4,286	5,555	8,359	7,823	6,732	4,984	San Pedro
Numero	580	476	538	395	450	–	Mabitac
Olla	1,009	1,043	1,073	1,019	784	623	Majayjay
Oobi	730	1,007	776	576	382	243	Majayjay
Oogong	4,782	3,490	3,227	2,404	2,413	1,877	Santa Cruz
Oples	1,465	1,271	1,271	1,096	801	254	Liliw
Oples	502	415	370	302	227	196	Nagcarlan
Origuel (Poblacion)	1,446	1,183	1,086	1,292	1,381	1,399	Majayjay
P. Burgos	4,805	2,599	2,790	2,486	2,205	1,852	Siniloan
Paagahan	4,043	3,681	3,229	3,103	2,820	2,313	Mabitac
Paciano Rizal	4,041	3,789	3,531	3,267	2,781	2,399	Bay
Paciano Rizal	15,679	11,958	11,733	10,152	8,152	8,169	Calamba
Pacita 1	22,581	–	–	–	–	–	San Pedro
Pacita 2	11,993	–	–	–	–	–	San Pedro
Pagalangan	1,630	1,391	1,647	1,651	1,462	986	Victoria
Pag-Asa (Poblacion)	1,089	1,206	1,301	1,300	1,355	1,465	Liliw
Pag-Asa (Poblacion)	946	998	953	956	781	723	Mabitac
Pagsawitan	10,183	9,299	8,913	8,451	7,289	5,680	Santa Cruz
Palasan	3,620	3,118	2,916	2,367	1,774	1,603	Santa Cruz
Palayan	1,052	631	655	351	266	200	Liliw
Palayan	1,314	1,181	1,101	719	664	494	Nagcarlan
Palina	1,537	1,439	1,168	877	699	649	Nagcarlan
Palingon	5,249	6,403	5,093	4,612	3,410	3,824	Calamba
Paliparan	1,057	942	888	630	550	494	Calauan
Palma	3,052	2,251	2,135	1,827	1,599	1,406	Alaminos
Palo-Alto	18,874	10,628	7,270	2,881	2,132	1,913	Calamba
Panalaban	67	199	210	123	33	7	Majayjay
Pandeno	3,474	3,379	3,040	2,513	2,245	2,236	Siniloan
Pangil	817	740	614	414	244	168	Majayjay
Panglan	441	467	440	315	101	16	Majayjay
Pansol	11,623	10,868	9,980	8,378	6,517	4,941	Calamba
Pansol	2,493	2,444	1,993	1,731	1,649	1,423	Pila
Pao-o	827	643	545	513	449	413	Santa Maria
Paowin	890	571	571	716	710	593	Cavinti
Parang Ng Buho	949	780	702	579	611	625	Santa Maria
Parian	25,558	20,248	19,587	13,601	10,767	10,278	Calamba
Patimbao	9,306	7,957	7,289	6,026	6,106	4,574	Santa Cruz
Paule 1	1,277	1,054	1,053	802	695	582	Rizal
Paule 2	2,110	1,725	1,709	1,066	988	941	Rizal
Perez	3,252	2,723	2,661	2,081	1,597	1,651	Calauan
Piit	700	518	422	354	269	244	Majayjay
Pinagbayanan	6,094	5,305	5,011	4,061	3,217	2,865	Pila
Pinagsanjan	5,134	4,986	4,991	4,233	4,131	3,566	Pagsanjan
Pittland	6,052	1,740	1,627	1,086	808	623	Cabuyao
Platero	14,803	11,428	12,866	9,287	8,083	6,247	Biñan
Poblacion	5,012	3,640	3,031	2,842	3,414	3,334	Biñan
Poblacion	6,696	6,480	6,334	6,469	6,225	6,248	Cavinti
Poblacion	2,495	2,649	2,084	2,714	2,584	2,705	Magdalena
Poblacion	5,771	5,572	5,861	5,950	5,261	5,483	San Pedro
Poblacion I (Poblacion)	1,545	1,840	1,904	1,913	2,038	2,096	Nagcarlan
Poblacion II (Poblacion)	3,309	3,432	3,604	3,495	4,228	3,885	Nagcarlan
Poblacion III (Poblacion)	2,346	2,925	2,810	3,113	3,348	3,068	Nagcarlan
Pook	121	434	319	305	89	96	Majayjay
Pook	2,089	1,796	1,808	1,445	1,289	1,078	Rizal
Pook	55,705	33,544	21,775	15,269	10,434	6,753	Santa Rosa
Primera Parang (Poblacion)	1,040	1,230	1,196	1,219	1,167	1,359	Lumban
Primera Pulo (Poblacion)	2,104	2,295	2,176	2,277	2,162	2,074	Lumban
Prinza	5,284	3,996	2,737	2,699	598	606	Calamba
Prinza	2,840	2,551	2,719	2,491	2,186	1,873	Calauan
Pulo	35,113	15,124	13,193	7,746	5,722	4,748	Cabuyao
Pulong Santa Cruz	29,421	19,277	16,440	11,045	8,587	4,666	Santa Rosa
Punta	7,321	3,511	2,615	1,555	1,214	1,108	Calamba
Putho Tuntungin	9,300	8,692	7,445	5,438	4,548	4,088	Los Baños
Puting Lupa	2,389	1,720	2,383	1,375	1,091	927	Calamba
Puypuy	4,390	3,203	2,805	2,173	1,863	1,344	Bay
Quinale (Poblacion)	7,255	7,035	7,476	6,643	6,035	5,308	Paete
Real	16,371	13,805	13,375	11,019	9,645	7,409	Calamba
Riverside	3,028	2,727	4,244	2,878	2,019	826	San Pedro
Rizal	301	292	119	147	172	125	Majayjay
Rizal (Poblacion)	688	799	885	927	946	1,000	Liliw
Rizal (Poblacion)	3,130	2,440	2,097	1,713	1,603	1,448	Pakil
Rosario	5,911	–	–	–	–	–	San Pedro
Sabang	1,395	1,130	1,038	726	523	328	Magdalena
Sabang	522	428	367	260	245	204	Nagcarlan
Sabang	3,731	2,873	2,345	2,184	1,637	1,211	Pagsanjan
Saimsim	6,166	5,504	4,634	1,704	861	962	Calamba
Sala	10,903	8,275	7,491	8,077	6,298	5,960	Cabuyao
Salac (Poblacion)	1,107	1,253	1,301	1,381	1,357	1,426	Lumban
Salangbato	884	887	790	556	468	374	Famy
Salasad	3,047	2,276	2,245	1,805	1,449	1,211	Magdalena
Salubungan	1,947	1,739	1,701	1,474	1,393	1,211	Siniloan
Sampaguita Village	4,941	5,342	4,571	4,162	3,286	3,324	San Pedro
Sampaloc	4,258	4,227	3,370	3,622	3,132	2,806	Pagsanjan
Sampiruhan	9,466	8,144	6,788	6,002	4,960	3,750	Calamba
San Agustin	6,235	4,650	4,482	3,857	3,332	2,809	Alaminos
San Agustin (Poblacion)	1,432	1,382	1,397	1,250	1,047	954	Bay
San Andres	4,473	3,180	2,958	2,783	2,309	1,822	Alaminos
San Antonio	5,730	5,583	5,563	4,723	4,216	3,589	Bay
San Antonio	36,163	23,067	30,468	18,192	14,933	14,916	Biñan
San Antonio	11,263	9,082	9,198	8,162	7,225	4,967	Kalayaan
San Antonio	15,978	13,173	12,544	8,627	7,684	7,620	Los Baños
San Antonio	3,289	3,035	2,432	2,510	2,367	1,851	Luisiana
San Antonio	1,548	1,298	1,216	1,033	868	775	Mabitac
San Antonio	3,836	3,024	3,315	2,650	2,077	1,822	Pila
San Antonio	59,368	52,074	47,825	38,504	32,276	21,270	San Pedro
San Antonio 1	6,081	4,813	4,374	3,169	2,631	2,025	San Pablo
San Antonio 2	4,693	3,492	3,497	2,800	2,212	1,842	San Pablo
San Bartolome	3,572	3,160	2,938	2,311	1,933	1,783	San Pablo
San Benito	6,655	5,720	4,876	4,586	3,948	3,356	Alaminos
San Benito	3,267	2,537	2,431	1,979	1,591	1,463	Victoria
San Buenaventura	1,954	1,896	1,929	1,641	1,552	1,340	Luisiana
San Buenaventura	4,396	3,696	3,292	3,206	2,427	2,338	San Pablo
San Crispin	5,067	3,795	2,778	2,843	2,900	2,510	San Pablo
San Cristobal	14,881	12,584	13,453	8,197	6,159	3,876	Calamba
San Cristobal	5,682	5,452	4,956	4,906	4,119	3,764	San Pablo
San Diego	2,705	2,372	2,530	2,132	2,100	2,055	Luisiana
San Diego	5,068	5,179	4,741	4,024	3,748	2,974	San Pablo
San Felix	1,499	1,153	949	817	595	543	Victoria
San Francisco	2,744	2,430	2,447	1,892	1,282	1,317	Nagcarlan
San Francisco (Calihan)	14,916	14,824	13,283	11,141	10,218	8,542	San Pablo
San Francisco	6,584	4,681	4,512	3,665	2,657	2,286	Victoria
San Francisco (Halang)	39,271	23,429	20,324	19,097	14,682	9,417	Biñan
San Francisco (Poblacion)	2,899	2,322	2,232	2,473	2,608	2,066	Majayjay
San Gabriel	8,875	7,800	7,121	6,025	3,978	4,055	San Pablo
San Gregorio	3,504	3,294	3,065	2,629	2,291	2,268	Alaminos
San Gregorio	8,720	5,508	4,801	3,196	2,661	2,001	San Pablo
San Ignacio	6,025	4,534	4,217	3,407	3,173	2,479	San Pablo
San Ildefonso	3,035	2,479	2,074	1,953	1,783	1,583	Alaminos
San Isidro	2,754	2,506	2,025	2,042	2,000	1,807	Bay
San Isidro (Putol)	23,324	18,145	15,495	7,243	3,475	2,571	Cabuyao
San Isidro	3,572	3,154	2,974	1,797	1,888	2,029	Calauan
San Isidro	489	342	335	240	216	173	Liliw
San Isidro	2,783	2,415	2,067	2,455	2,063	2,048	Luisiana
San Isidro	613	461	396	433	426	316	Majayjay
San Isidro	2,757	2,957	2,505	2,746	2,452	2,063	Pagsanjan
San Isidro	4,262	3,527	3,428	2,912	2,362	2,238	San Pablo
San Joaquin	1,670	1,467	1,474	1,057	860	632	San Pablo
San Jose	6,599	5,839	6,082	5,689	5,034	5,232	Biñan
San Jose	4,061	4,203	4,299	3,795	3,111	3,491	Calamba
San Jose	934	926	994	426	457	284	Luisiana
San Jose	10,720	6,992	5,803	4,217	2,918	2,005	San Pablo
San Jose	2,923	2,041	2,205	2,150	1,746	1,499	Santa Cruz
San Jose (Poblacion)	1,314	1,487	1,392	1,548	1,573	1,502	Pangil
San Juan	3,543	2,640	2,195	1,836	1,393	946	Alaminos
San Juan	4,826	4,780	4,309	3,892	3,729	3,997	Calamba
San Juan	349	340	351	241	247	174	Luisiana
San Juan	3,356	3,452	3,430	2,752	2,606	2,227	San Pablo
San Juan	3,972	2,523	1,886	2,008	1,846	1,415	Santa Cruz
San Juan (Poblacion)	6,662	5,990	6,118	6,260	5,084	4,251	Kalayaan
San Lorenzo	1,901	1,903	1,743	1,444	1,328	958	San Pablo
San Lorenzo Ruiz	5,800	–	–	–	–	–	San Pedro
San Lucas 1	6,127	5,343	4,805	4,703	3,953	3,130	San Pablo
San Lucas 2	6,474	5,770	4,462	3,547	2,583	2,293	San Pablo
San Luis	292	382	301	202	225	128	Luisiana
San Marcos	2,756	2,800	2,831	2,579	2,405	2,051	San Pablo
San Mateo	3,141	2,910	2,765	2,161	1,897	1,749	San Pablo
San Miguel	2,145	1,938	1,650	1,340	1,106	974	Alaminos
San Miguel	1,106	896	771	537	388	383	Mabitac
San Miguel	1,769	1,181	866	590	581	639	Pila
San Miguel	3,513	2,975	2,577	2,227	1,876	1,543	San Pablo
San Miguel (Poblacion)	4,132	2,576	2,193	2,915	3,512	3,221	Majayjay
San Nicolas	7,255	4,480	4,475	3,458	2,883	2,307	San Pablo
San Nicolas (Poblacion)	1,356	1,361	1,341	1,277	1,400	1,294	Bay
San Pablo	239	266	292	173	202	111	Luisiana
San Pablo Norte	2,751	2,853	3,264	3,162	3,121	2,941	Santa Cruz
San Pablo Sur	3,200	3,113	3,013	2,376	2,345	1,798	Santa Cruz
San Pedro	277	359	326	129	261	59	Luisiana
San Pedro	3,120	2,402	2,318	1,738	1,354	1,228	San Pablo
San Rafael	200	247	161	152	254	26	Luisiana
San Rafael	4,672	3,467	3,326	3,249	2,660	2,350	San Pablo
San Roque	2,283	1,536	1,714	1,436	1,235	1,073	Alaminos
San Roque	383	423	500	392	233	147	Luisiana
San Roque	110	299	200	241	48	3	Majayjay
San Roque	3,313	3,086	3,071	2,624	2,028	1,694	San Pablo
San Roque	7,161	6,974	7,925	7,043	6,105	6,020	San Pedro
San Roque (Poblacion)	10,852	8,420	8,746	7,801	6,930	6,001	Victoria
San Salvador	626	655	701	522	367	335	Luisiana
San Vicente	9,236	8,762	11,339	10,205	10,008	9,596	Biñan
San Vicente	3,505	3,169	3,281	2,227	1,407	1,317	San Pablo
San Vicente	27,561	92,092	86,716	77,717	62,737	58,796	San Pedro
Santa Ana	2,926	2,525	2,156	1,626	1,485	1,341	San Pablo
Santa Catalina	2,553	2,377	2,251	1,952	1,668	1,346	San Pablo
Santa Catalina (Poblacion)	2,042	1,322	1,132	1,275	1,740	1,685	Majayjay
Santa Clara Norte (Poblacion)	2,501	2,424	2,491	2,198	2,060	1,631	Pila
Santa Clara Sur (Poblacion)	5,901	5,253	5,691	5,044	4,279	3,747	Pila
Santa Cruz	2,726	2,439	2,122	1,997	1,778	1,700	Bay
Santa Cruz	2,823	2,365	2,415	1,919	1,663	1,516	San Pablo
Santa Elena	4,606	4,423	4,269	3,681	3,095	2,793	San Pablo
Santa Felomina	3,567	3,431	3,405	2,951	2,639	2,291	San Pablo
Santa Isabel	3,830	3,258	3,342	2,852	2,389	2,224	San Pablo
Santa Lucia	3,024	2,680	2,269	2,011	1,942	1,697	Nagcarlan
Santa Maria	4,022	3,293	3,422	2,293	1,807	1,754	San Pablo
Santa Maria Magdalena	2,778	2,428	2,427	2,159	1,807	1,579	San Pablo
Santa Monica	10,088	7,266	7,183	5,574	4,547	4,156	San Pablo
Santa Rosa	3,497	3,579	3,813	3,430	3,442	3,252	Alaminos
Santa Veronica	1,920	1,540	1,270	1,116	876	769	San Pablo
Santiago	3,856	1,376	1,630	1,574	1,284	1,391	Santa Maria
Santiago I	2,739	2,068	1,807	1,749	1,589	1,518	San Pablo
Santiago II	3,445	3,030	3,061	2,483	1,720	2,032	San Pablo
Santisima Cruz	9,801	9,921	9,887	9,538	8,434	9,514	Santa Cruz
Santisimo Rosario	5,397	4,528	4,382	3,590	3,122	2,889	San Pablo
Santo Angel	8,574	8,774	8,447	7,699	6,956	4,199	San Pablo
Santo Angel Central	4,588	4,551	4,306	4,246	3,983	3,509	Santa Cruz
Santo Angel Norte	5,417	5,773	5,257	4,775	5,146	4,586	Santa Cruz
Santo Angel Sur	4,066	4,794	4,206	4,160	4,520	4,970	Santa Cruz
Santo Cristo	3,240	3,086	3,058	2,946	3,012	2,037	San Pablo
Santo Domingo	9,904	6,237	5,019	3,768	3,180	2,593	Bay
Santo Domingo	6,159	5,456	5,548	4,660	3,746	3,183	Biñan
Santo Domingo	552	502	553	436	422	386	Luisiana
Santo Domingo	6,863	3,178	2,617	1,295	1,107	867	Santa Rosa
Santo Niño	7,736	5,201	6,892	4,935	3,593	2,279	Biñan
Santo Niño	5,682	4,163	4,168	3,156	2,316	1,752	San Pablo
Santo Niño	3,892	4,052	4,071	4,053	4,018	3,870	San Pedro
Santo Niño (Poblacion)	1,100	1,174	1,282	1,285	1,148	1,205	Lumban
Santo Tomas	12,986	11,918	2,921	2,096	1,710	1,421	Calauan
Santo Tomas	1,755	1,740	1,453	1,375	1,136	1,001	Luisiana
Santo Tomas (Calabuso)	55,649	38,990	39,370	30,113	21,727	10,530	Biñan
Saray	405	273	321	372	440	602	Pakil
Segunda Parang (Poblacion)	1,199	1,242	1,103	1,587	1,499	1,184	Lumban
Segunda Pulo (Poblacion)	1,589	1,418	1,513	1,768	1,618	1,389	Lumban
Sibulan	523	471	508	363	282	298	Nagcarlan
Silangan (Poblacion)	1,662	1,953	2,069	1,900	1,983	1,597	Calauan
Silangan Ilaya	2,385	2,067	1,971	1,596	1,283	829	Nagcarlan
Silangan Kabubuhayan	880	855	784	851	718	715	Nagcarlan
Silangan Lazaan	1,314	1,248	1,198	1,102	1,039	936	Nagcarlan
Silangan Napapatid	836	797	721	636	501	423	Nagcarlan
Silangan Talaongan	2,024	1,670	1,653	1,757	1,131	961	Cavinti
Silangang Bukal	174	148	178	90	109	116	Liliw
Sinagtala (Poblacion)	883	732	779	857	844	745	Mabitac
Sinalhan	26,274	19,082	20,412	15,886	13,252	9,709	Santa Rosa
Sinipian	611	676	695	539	420	389	Nagcarlan
Sirang Lupa	12,938	8,225	6,683	5,466	3,252	2,248	Calamba
Sisilmin	341	275	381	181	173	160	Cavinti
Soledad	3,760	2,476	2,925	2,094	1,727	1,443	San Pablo
Soro-soro	7,189	6,708	6,595	4,837	5,422	3,334	Biñan
Suba	2,099	1,690	1,977	1,823	1,719	1,276	Majayjay
Sucol	5,233	4,779	4,300	3,640	3,196	2,380	Calamba
Sulib	6,774	6,081	6,432	5,779	4,697	3,996	Pangil
Sulsuguin	286	232	224	196	214	189	Nagcarlan
Sumucab	421	323	324	297	212	321	Cavinti
Tadlak	4,043	3,342	3,002	2,302	1,773	1,322	Los Baños
Taft (Poblacion)	1,300	1,277	1,426	1,297	1,232	877	Pakil
Tagapo	42,104	20,573	24,058	16,067	12,659	9,523	Santa Rosa
Tagumpay	3,118	2,026	1,919	1,586	1,380	1,145	Bay
Tala	3,014	2,557	2,601	2,282	1,992	1,452	Rizal
Talaga	2,319	1,967	1,872	1,536	1,045	1,024	Rizal
Talahib	328	318	274	222	221	230	Nagcarlan
Talangan	2,038	1,949	1,977	1,895	1,800	1,488	Nagcarlan
Talangka	1,881	1,678	1,580	1,424	1,213	1,043	Santa Maria
Talortor	1,105	952	743	632	633	533	Majayjay
Tanawan	294	199	235	161	106	13	Magdalena
Tanawan	85	289	236	193	51	71	Majayjay
Tavera (Poblacion)	1,810	1,868	1,982	1,572	1,276	963	Pakil
Taytay	415	506	436	214	177	225	Majayjay
Taytay	3,490	3,069	3,026	2,288	2,288	1,958	Nagcarlan
Tibatib	199	192	126	134	134	130	Cavinti
Timbao	15,464	8,746	3,497	1,837	1,161	981	Biñan
Timugan (Poblacion)	5,848	5,279	5,322	4,538	3,827	3,275	Los Baños
Tipacan	155	200	149	126	17	19	Nagcarlan
Tipunan	1,323	1,156	1,029	768	648	522	Magdalena
Tranca	3,388	3,150	2,996	2,500	2,159	2,017	Bay
Tubigan	6,247	6,416	5,331	4,217	3,621	3,657	Biñan
Tubuan	2,308	2,153	1,933	1,453	1,108	948	Pila
Tungkod	1,745	1,357	804	1,118	873	855	Santa Maria
Tunhac	1,957	2,325	2,669	1,793	1,371	847	Famy
Turbina	6,268	4,475	3,677	2,143	1,482	1,384	Calamba
Tuy	2,115	1,750	1,671	1,391	1,309	1,041	Rizal
Tuy-Baanan	1,214	913	888	816	749	637	Liliw
Udia	960	734	704	481	374	223	Cavinti
Ulango	1,060	858	845	739	822	748	Calamba
United Bayanihan	5,385	6,542	5,420	3,882	2,577	1,741	San Pedro
United Better Living	6,204	6,473	6,779	1,412	791	640	San Pedro
Uwisan	2,971	2,358	2,367	1,826	1,166	1,084	Calamba
Villa Nogales	126	228	155	147	190	200	Majayjay
Wakat	1,702	1,558	1,252	1,227	1,006	1,002	Nagcarlan
Wawa	4,084	3,321	2,832	2,762	2,233	1,692	Lumban
Wawa	3,030	3,044	2,945	2,462	2,411	2,062	Siniloan
West Poblacion	1,074	1,069	1,229	1,294	1,335	1,132	Rizal
Yukos	5,431	5,133	4,899	4,102	3,398	3,009	Nagcarlan
Zapote	14,684	4,027	1,859	807	796	423	Biñan
Barangay	2020	2010	2007	2000	1995	1990	City or municipality
*Italicized names are former names.; *Dashes (—) in cells indicate unavailable census data.

[top]
