= PNHS =

PNHS may refer to:

- Persons of National Historic Significance
- Plainfield North High School, a public high school in Plainfield, Illinois
- Portage Northern High School, a public high school in Portage, Michigan
- Pretoria North High School, a public high school in Pretoria, South Africa
- Punta National High School - Main (Calamba City)
- Parañaque National High School
