= Kay-Anlog, Calamba =

Kay-Anlog
- Component Barangay
- Kay-Anlog
- Shot of Purok Uno

- Seal
- Interactive map of Kay-Anlog
- Location of Kay-Anlog in Luzon map
- Coordinates: 14°9′50.25″N 121°7′10.79″E
- Country: Philippines
- Province: Laguna
- Region: Calabarzon (Region IV-A)
- City: Calamba
- Puroks: 4

Government
  - Chairman: Nemar G. Mendoza
  - Councilors: Nancy G. Mendoza; Jimmy O. Castillo; Joanne M. Soriano; Marcos E. Alcantara; Valeriano T. Evangelista; Marni M. Matamis; Aaron Lucido
  - SK Chairman: Kym Ervin Alcantara

Area
  - Land: 2.72 km^{2} (1.05 sq mi)
- Elevation: 167.406 m (549.23 ft)

Population (2024)
  - Total: 21,095
  - Density: 7,756.25/km^{2} (20,088.6/sq mi)
- Time zone: UTC+8 (PST)
- Postal code: 4027
- Area code: 49

Kay-Anlog is a component barangay of the city in Calamba, Laguna, Philippines, situated in the southern part of the city, adjacent to the barangays of Milagrosa, Burol, Bubuyan, and Ulango.

== Geography ==
Kay-Anlog is located at the southern edge of the city of Calamba, being one of the "upland barangays". At 272 hectares, it is one of the largest barangays by area in Calamba. It is a landlocked barangay bordered by Makiling and Milagrosa to the east, Ulango to the south, Punta to the north, Bubuyan and Burol to the west, Laurel, Batangas to the south. All of those districts are in Calamba, excluding barangay Laurel that is in Tanauan, Batangas.

== Puroks ==
Kay-Anlog is subdivided into 4 puroks (zones). These are:

- Purok uno (zone one) or kanluran(west);
- Purok dos (zone two) or gitna(middle);
- Purok tres (zone three) or silangan(east) and;
- Purok kwatro (zone four) or pasong diablo

Kay-Anlog has 6 subdivisions these are;

- Mother Ignacia
- Villa Andrea
- Villa Javier
- Southville 6
- Calambeño Ville 5
- Valley Breeze

== History ==
The namesake of the barangay is from Anlog, a man who is said to be the original resident of Buwisan and a former estate steward. He originally lived in Ulango, Tanauan, Batangas. The phrase "Kay Anlog" means "Anlog's property" as the area is named after him.

In the 1903 Philippine census, Buisan can be found as one of Calamba's barangays. It is said to be the former name of the barangay. In 1918 census, Quianlog appeared and Buisan disappeared from the census. This is due to changing of name of the barangay. Thru time, the barangay was eventually named Kay-Anlog.

== Demographics ==
=== Population ===
Population census of Kay-Anlog
Year	Pop.	±% p.a.
1903	48	—
1918	48	+0.00%
1948	299	+6.29%
1960	452	+3.50%
1970	527	+1.55%
1980	639	+1.95%
1990	962	+4.18%
1995	1,119	+2.87%
2000	1,337	+3.89%
2007	2,195	+7.08%
2010	2,665	+7.32%
2015	13,946	+37.05%
2020	20,487	+8.43%
2024	21,095	+0.70%
Source: Philippine Statistics Authority

In 1903 Census, the barangay was known as "Buisan". In 1918, it became "Quianlog" in 1948 it became "Buwisan" and on the following censuses it was named "Kay-Anlog".

Before 2010, Kay-Anlog was one of the barangays with the least population due to its remoteness especially from Calamba Poblacion. After the 2010 census, the population increased drastically due to government's housing projects in the barangay and became one of the most populous barangays in the city.

=== Religion ===
According to the 2015 Philippine census of the Philippine Statistics Authority, majority of the population of Kay-Anlog are Christian, with most being a part of the Roman Catholic Church at 89.33%. Other religions present in Kay-Anlog are Iglesia ni Cristo (3.97%), Jesus is Lord Church (0.57%), Church of Jesus Christ of Latter-day Saints (0.27%), Evangelicals (0.26%), Seventh Day Adventist (0.22%), Jesus is Alive Community Incorporated (0.14%), Islam (0.11%), Philippine Independent Church (0.10%), Jehovah's Witnesses (0.09%), and other Mainline Protestants.

Religious Affiliation of Population of Kay-Anlog (2015)
Roman Catholic Church	12,458
Iglesia ni Cristo	553
Jesus is Lord Church	80
Church of Jesus Christ of Latter-day Saints	37
Evangelicals	36
Seventh Day Adventist	30
Other Baptists	183
Other Religious Affiliations	569

== Education ==
Kay-Anlog has two public elementary schools and a private elementary school, these are: Kay-Anlog Elementary School, Southville 6 Elementary School, and South Greenfields Academy of Learning Incorporated respectively. Recently, Kay-anlog opened it's first ever secondary school but it is only available for Grade 7 students and the building is in pending construction. The nearest secondary schools in Kay-Anlog with Grade 8 and above are Punta Integrated School (public) and ACC Institute (private) both located in Punta.

Immanuel International Theological College is also located in Kay-Anlog.

== Government ==
Barangay Chairman of Kay-Anlog, Calamba, Laguna
- Punong Barangay ng Kay-Anlog (in Tagalog)
- Incumbent; Nemar Mendoza since December 1, 2023
- Style: Barangay Chairman, Chairman, Barangay Captain, Captain
- Residence: Kay-Anlog Barangay Hall Building, Brgy. Kay-Anlog, Calamba, Laguna
- Appointer: Elected via popular vote
- Inaugural holder: Narciso Unico
- Formation: 1982

Just like any barangays in the Philippines, Kay-Anlog is headed by elected officials, the topmost being the Punong Barangay or the Barangay Chairperson (addressed as Kapitan; also known as the Barangay Captain). The Kapitan is aided by the Sangguniang Barangay (Barangay Council) whose members, called Barangay Kagawad ("Councilors"), are also elected.

=== Barangay Officials ===
On 14 May 2018, a barangay elections were held in all barangays of the country including Kay-Anlog. Originally scheduled for October 2016, these elections supposedly concluded the 2016 election cycle that started in May with the election of the Philippine president, the members of Philippine Congress and provincial, city and municipal officials. It was then postponed to October 2017, then was postponed further to May 2018. There were attempts to postpone it further, but Congress ran out of time to pass a law to postpone the elections further. Elections for the reformed Sangguniang Kabataan (SK; youth councils) will also be held at the same time. This shall be the first SK elections since 2010.

Incumbent Kay-Anlog barangay officials
Barangay Council
Position	Name
Barangay Chairman	Nemar G. Mendoza
Barangay Councilors	Nancy G. Mendoza
Barangay Councilors	Jimmy O. Castillo
Barangay Councilors	Joanne M. Soriano
Barangay Councilors	Marcos E. Alcantara
Barangay Councilors	Valeriano T. Evangelista
Barangay Councilors	Marni M. Matamis
Barangay Councilors	Aaron O. Lucido
Sangguniang Kabataan Council
Position	Name
SK Chairman	Kym Ervin J. Alcantara
SK Councilors	Liza P. De Leon
SK Councilors	Clint Newton A. Magpantay
SK Councilors	Jayson Miranda
SK Councilors	Francis Jay A. Latagan
SK Councilors	Zaira Mae F. Miranda
SK Councilors	Jhowin Homer A. Maglinao
SK Councilors	Rico G. Cedalla

=== List of Barangay Chairmen of Kay-Anlog ===
- Narciso Unico (1982–1989)
- Basilio Panganiban (1989–2007)
- Felipe Tercero (2007–2010)
- Nestor Mendoza (2010–2023)
- Nemar Mendoza (2023–present)

== Climate ==
Kay-Anlog has a tropical climate. There is significant rainfall in most months of the year. The short dry season has little effect on the overall climate. The climate here is classified as Am by the Köppen-Geiger system. The temperature here averages 26.4 °C. The average annual rainfall is 2021 mm.

Climate data for Kay-Anlog
Month	Jan	Feb	Mar	Apr	May	Jun	Jul	Aug	Sep	Oct	Nov	Dec	Year
Mean daily maximum °C	28.9	29.9	31.5	32.9	32.7	31.4	30.3	30.0	30.2	30.2	29.7	28.8	30.5
Daily mean °C	24.9	25.4	26.6	27.9	28.0	27.3	26.5	26.4	26.5	26.3	25.9	25.2	26.4
Mean daily minimum °C	20.9	20.9	21.7	22.9	23.4	23.2	22.8	22.9	22.8	22.5	22.2	21.6	22.3
Average precipitation cm	4.6	2.2	2.7	3.8	16.5	23.0	32.7	31.3	27.4	23.1	20.5	14.3	202.1
Mean daily maximum °F	84.0	85.8	88.7	91.2	90.9	88.5	86.5	86.0	86.4	86.4	85.5	83.8	87.0
Daily mean °F	76.8	77.7	79.9	82.2	82.4	81.1	79.7	79.5	79.7	79.3	78.6	77.4	79.5
Mean daily minimum °F	69.6	69.6	71.1	73.2	74.1	73.8	73.0	73.2	73.0	72.5	72.0	70.9	72.2
Average precipitation inches	1.8	0.9	1.1	1.5	6.5	9.1	12.9	12.3	10.8	9.1	8.1	5.6	79.7
Mean daily sunshine hours	11.5	11.5	12.0	12.5	13.0	13.0	13.0	12.5	12.0	12.0	11.5	11.5	12.2
Source 1:
Source 2:

== See also ==
Kay-Anlog local elections, 2007
