= Lost & Found (video game) =

Upcoming video game

- Developer: ShaggyBearGames
- Publisher: ShaggyBearGames
- Designer: Kurt Reodica
- Platform: Windows
- Release: 2027
- Genre: Adventure
- Mode: Single-player

Lost & Found is an upcoming adventure-mystery video game developed by Filipino solo developer Kurt Reodica under the studio name ShaggyBearGames. The game is scheduled for release on Windows through Steam in 2027.

Set in 2007, the story follows a dog character Rico, a struggling artist who returns to his hometown of Luisiana after failing to build a career in the city. Looking for stable work, he accepts a job at the town's lost and found office. As Rico begins to return lost property, he begins to learn more about the people of the town, and the memories associated with the objects they leave behind. Players explore each item by interviewing residents, looking for clues and determining who the rightful owner is.

The game attracted attention online for its visual presentation, which combines 2D animation, 3D environments, and pixel-art elements. Reodica cited animated series such as The Amazing World of Gumball as one of the project's artistic influences. He is also inspired by the 2023 film Perfect Days. From that, Reodica aims for the NPCs in the game to feel the same way, ordinary people with everyday routines but with deeper emotions and personal stories beneath the surface.

== Gameplay ==
Lost & Found is a story-focused adventure game centered on exploration and investigation. Players take on the role of Rico, who manages the local lost and found office and converses with the residents of Luisiana. Every piece of evidence collected has a story to tell about its owner and players are encouraged to listen in on conversations, locations and details within the scope of each case.

The game features branching outcomes and dialogue choices. Returning an item to the wrong person could change the course of certain events or affect Rico's relationships with other characters. Luisiana is depicted as a quiet provincial town based on the day-to-day life in the Philippines. In the background are sari-sari stores, roadside eateries, tricycles and other familiar sights of rural communities.

== Plot ==
After losing his job in the city Rico returns home to Luisiana to try and start over. But he soon discovers that the town he once knew has changed over the years. Some of his old friends have moved away, local establishments have disappeared, and many residents are fighting their own private wars.

Rico's job in the lost and found exposes him to the lives of the different townspeople. Photographs, receipts, letters and souvenirs slowly yield tales of love, regret, family and change in everyday things. As Rico becomes more entrenched in Luisiana, he reconnects with the town and discovers truths that lie just below its placid surface.

== Development ==
Lost & Found is being developed by Kurt Reodica, who works independently under the name ShaggyBearGames. Reodica is responsible for the game's writing, programming, animation, and overall design. Before entering game development, Reodica worked in animation at Puppeteer Animation Studios after finishing his Multimedia Arts course at De La Salle Lipa. He said he draws inspiration from slice-of-life films and animated television shows dealing with everyday experiences and emotional storytelling.

The project is inspired by story-driven titles like Night In the Woods (2017) and Return of the Obra Dinn (2018). It focuses on the way players get to know the characters little by little, by exploring the town, noticing small details, and slowly putting together what they find along the way. Development on the game reportedly began around 2025, when Reodica has spoken about the challenges of handling every part of production by himself while trying to keep the project ambitious without going beyond what he could realistically manage. He said, "We're working on a vertical slice demo and a playable build is expected in early 2027." Reodica has also spoken about the idea of releasing the game on consoles at a later stage.

== Reception ==
On March 27, 2026, before its release, Reodica announced that Lost & Found had already reached 5,000 wishlists on Steam. A few days later, on April 5, he shared that the game had grown to 12,000 wishlists within its first two days on the platform.
