= Punta Integrated School =

Public high school in Laguna, Philippines

- Pinagsamang Paaralan ng Punta
- Old logo of Punta Integrated School when it was still called as Punta National High School

Location
- Purok 6, Punta; Calamba, Laguna; Philippines
- Coordinates: 14°10′36″N 121°07′04″E

Information
- Type: Public
- Established: 1971
- School district: Calamba West
- Principal: Imee P. Aldea
- Grades: 7 to 12
- Campus: Punta, Calamba

Punta Integrated School formerly known as Punta National High School is a public high school in Punta, Calamba, Laguna, Philippines. It offers both junior high school (grades 7–10) and senior high school (grades 11–12).
