= Luisiana =

Municipality in Laguna, Philippines

Luisiana Luis y Ana
- Municipality
- Municipality of Luisiana
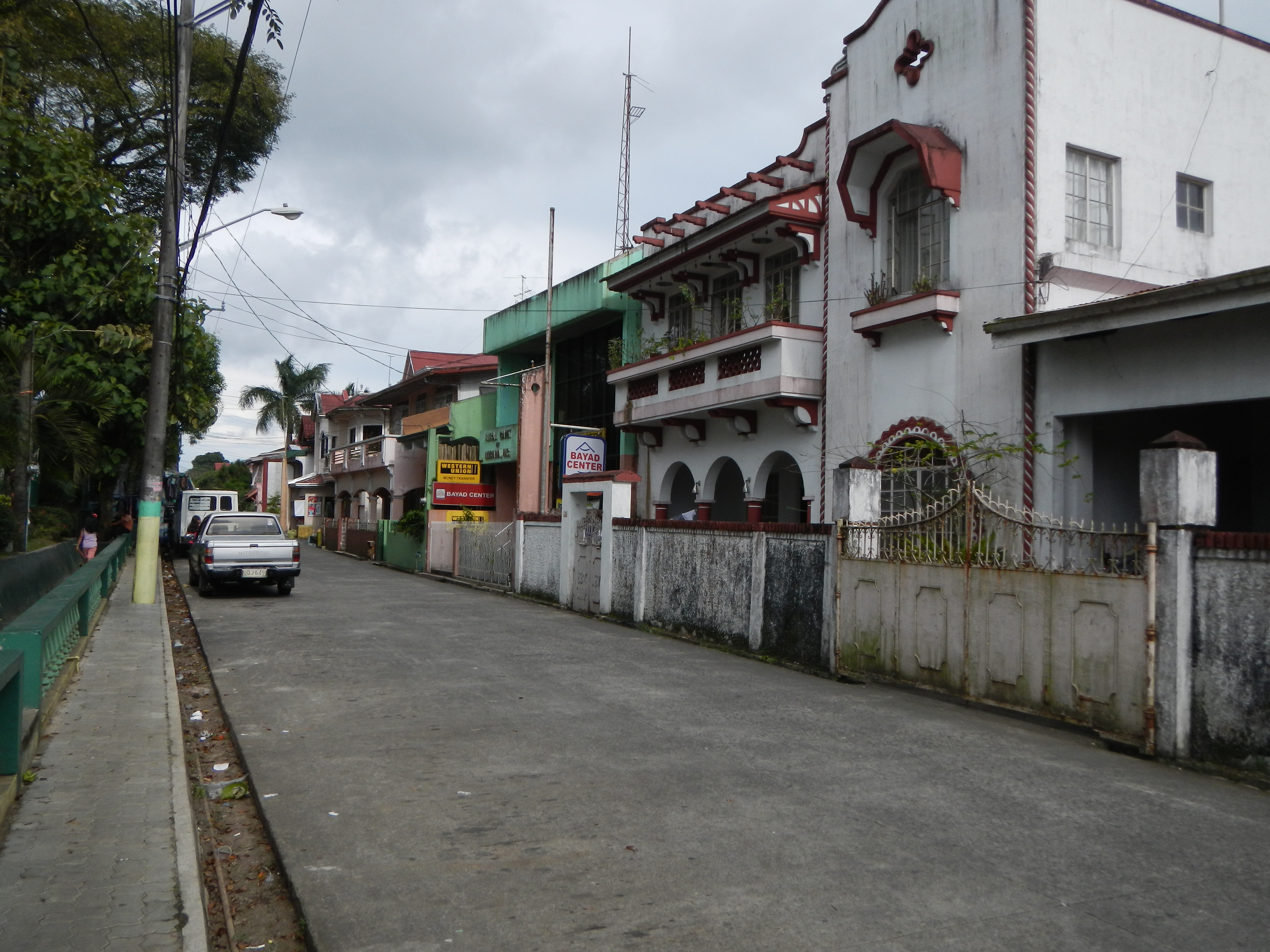
- Downtown area Town Hall Hulugan Falls

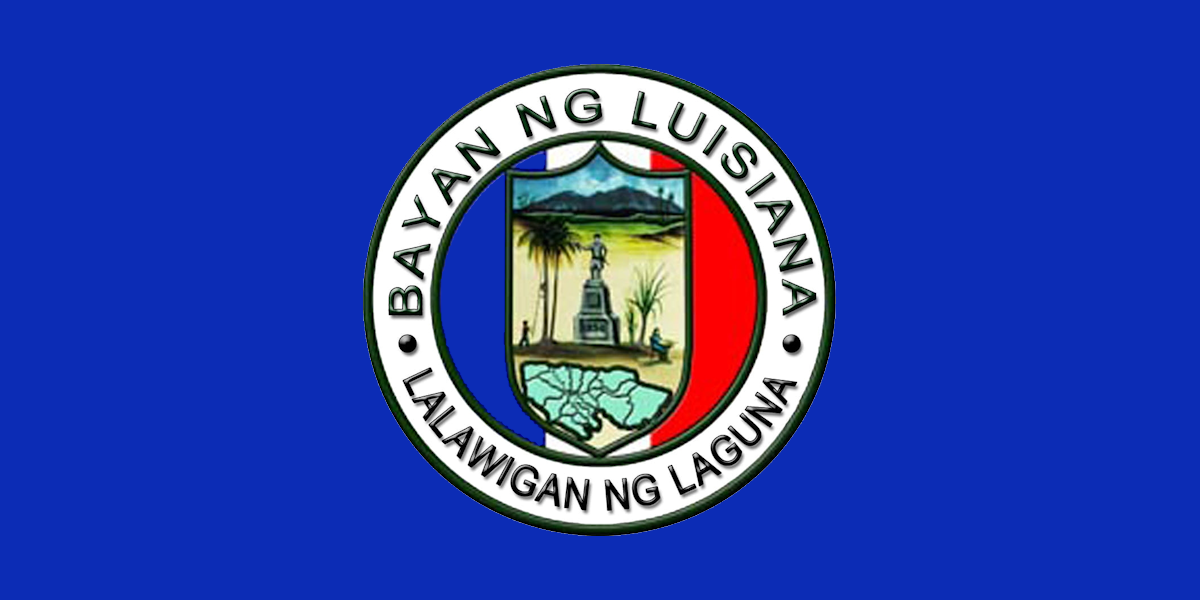
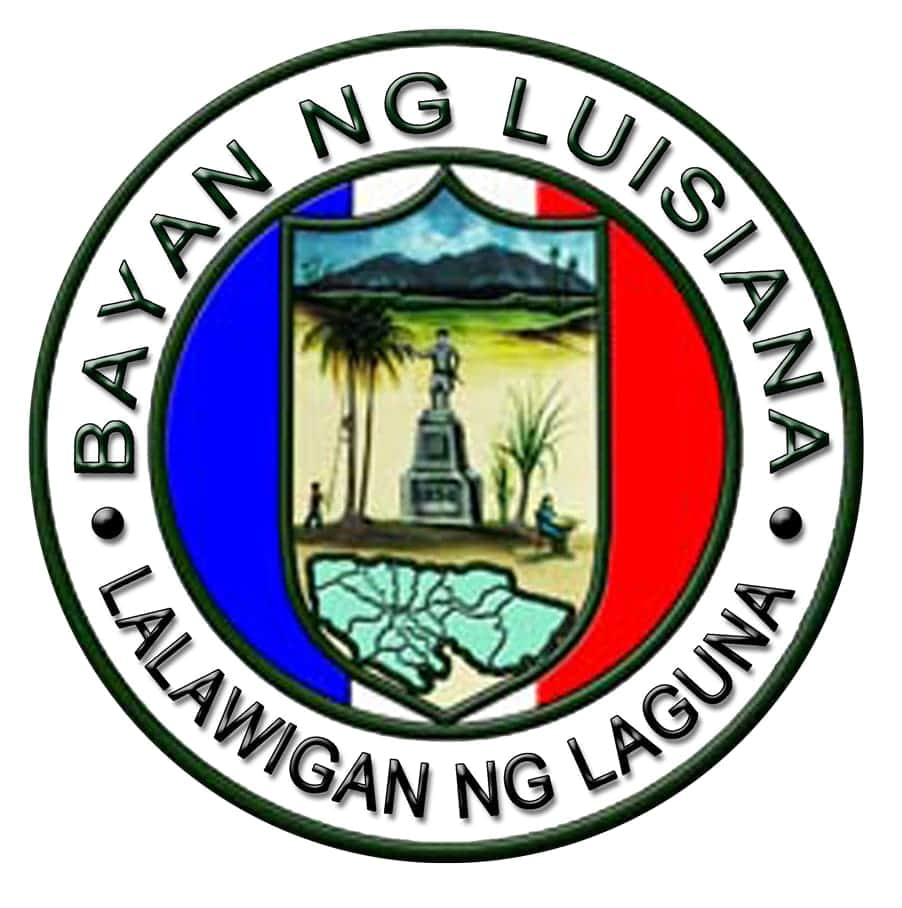
- Flag Seal
- Nicknames: Little Baguio of Laguna; Pandán Capital of Laguna and the Philippines; Home of Hulugan Falls, Pandan Products, Bibingka And Lambanog
- Anthem: Luisiana March
- Map of Laguna with Luisiana highlighted
- Interactive map of Luisiana
- Location within the Philippines
- Coordinates: 14°11′06″N 121°30′39″E
- Country: Philippines
- Region: Calabarzon
- Province: Laguna
- District: 4th district
- Founded: April 3, 1854
- Named for: Don Luis Bernardo and Doña Ana Bernardo
- Barangays: 23 (see Barangays)

Government
  - Type: Sangguniang Bayan
  - Mayor: Jonieces R. Acaylar
  - Vice Mayor: Hans Christian Rondilla
  - Representative: Benjamin C. Agarao Jr.
  - Municipal Council: Members: Hans Christian R. Rondilla; Romnick A. Racoma; Elaine E. Teope; Eulogio D. Suario Jr.; Marlon M. Oblinida; Arnulfo I. Abrejera; Marvin A. Padayhag; Raya Fe A. Gaela
  - Electorate: 15,164 voters (2025)

Area
  - Total: 73.31 km^{2} (28.31 sq mi)
- Highest elevation: 973 m (3,192 ft)
- Lowest elevation: 10 m (33 ft)

Population (2024 census)
  - Total: 21,824
  - Density: 297.7/km^{2} (771.0/sq mi)
  - Households: 5,102
- Demonym: Luisianahin

Economy
  - Income class: 4th municipal income class
  - Poverty incidence: 13.34% (2023)
  - Revenue: ₱ 163 million (2024)
  - Assets: ₱ 564.5 million (2024)
  - Expenditure: ₱ 61.62 million (2024)
  - Liabilities: ₱ 170.4 million (2024)

Service provider
  - Electricity: Manila Electric Company (Meralco)
- Time zone: UTC+8 (PST)
- ZIP code: 4032
- PSGC: 0403412000
- IDD : area code: +63 (0)49
- Native languages: Tagalog

Luisiana, officially the Municipality of Luisiana (Tagalog: Bayan ng Luisiana), is a municipality in the province of Laguna, Philippines. According to the 2024 census, it has a population of 21,824 people.

It is known as the Little Baguio of Laguna because of its high elevation and cool climate akin to Baguio.

== History ==
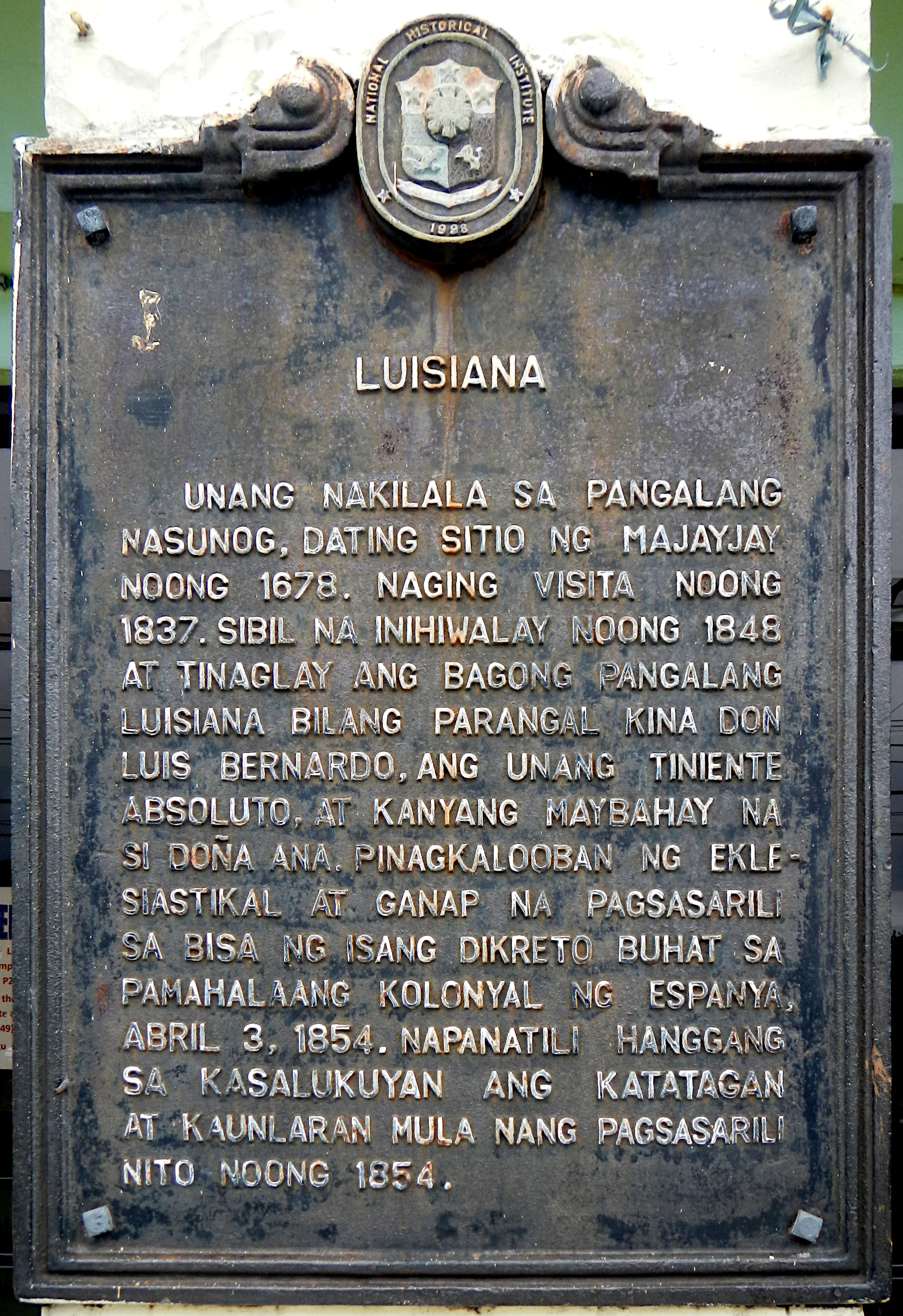
National historical marker installed in 1998 at the municipal hall

During the 17th century, there was an area of land in Laguna known as Terreno de Nasunog or Lupain ng Nasunog, which was part of Majayjay, Laguna. The name "Luisiana" was given in honor of Don Luis Bernardo and his wife Doña Ana Esperanza, who fought for the independence of Luisiana.

In 1825, Don Luis Bernardo, one of Nasunog de Majayjay's principales, initiated the move to establish it as a town and parish separate and independent from Majayjay. However, it was only in 1832 when Nasunog de Majayjay was elevated to a visita, which was later called Visita de Luisiana.

The original name was "Luis y Ana", which later became "Luisiana". It was only on April 3, 1854, that ecclesiastical independence was granted to San Luis by the Marqués de Novaliches, then the Governor-General, with the corresponding approval of the Archbishop of Manila, with Don Marcos Bartolomé as its first interim parish priest. The town's Catholic church, dedicated to Our Lady of the Rosary, was established in 1854 but burnt down in 1872 before being rebuilt.

In 1903, the towns of Cavinti and Luisiana were united, Pedro Villanueva of Cavinti was elected mayor, and the Philippine Independent Church was founded in April 1904. The Romana family funded the construction of a couple of Protestant churches. However, in 1907, under the leadership of Don Blas Oración, through the Civil Commission, Cavinti separated from Luisiana and became an independent town.

== Government ==
=== Elected officials ===
Luisiana Municipal Officials (2025–2028)
| Name | Party | Term of office | |
| Name | Party | Start | End |
Municipal Mayor
| Jomapher "Mapher" U. Alvarez | PFP | 30 June 2025 | 30 June 2028 |
Municipal Vice Mayor
| Jonieces "Engr. Joni" R. Acaylar | Lakas–CMD | 30 June 2025 | 30 June 2028 |
Member of the Municipal Council
| Hans Christian "Ian" R. Rondilla | NUP | 30 June 2025 | 30 June 2028 |
| Romnick A. Racoma | AKAY | 30 June 2025 | 30 June 2028 |
| Elaine E. Teope | AKBAYAN | 30 June 2025 | 30 June 2028 |
| Eulogio "Oyong" D. Suario Jr. | Lakas–CMD | 30 June 2025 | 30 June 2028 |
| Marlon M. Oblinida | PFP | 30 June 2025 | 30 June 2028 |
| Arnulfo "Bisaya" I. Abrejera | AKAY | 30 June 2025 | 30 June 2028 |
| Marvin "Mr. Announcer" A. Padayhag | AKAY | 30 June 2025 | 30 June 2028 |
| Raya Fe A. Gaela | Lakas–CMD | 30 June 2025 | 30 June 2028 |
ABC Federation President
| Felicisimo "Felicing" B. Esperanza | Nonpartisan (San Diego) | 15 December 2023 | 30 June 2028 |
SK Federation President
| Duke Ezekiel A. Cuala | Nonpartisan (San Antonio) | 15 December 2023 | 30 June 2028 |

== Geography ==
Luisiana is bounded on the north by Pagsanjan and Cavinti, on the west by Magdalena and Majayjay, on the south by Lucban and on the east by Sampaloc.

Luisiana is 22 kilometers (14 mi) from the provincial capital Santa Cruz, 109 kilometers (68 mi) from Manila and 34 kilometers (21 mi) from Lucena.

Luisiana occupies 8,096.33 hectares (20,006.5 acres) on a plateau 430 meters (1,410 ft) atop the Sierra Madre mountains.

=== Barangays ===
Luisiana is politically subdivided into 23 barangays, as indicated below. Each barangay consists of puroks and some have sitios.

- De La Paz
- Barangay Zone I (Poblacion)
- Barangay Zone II (Poblacion)
- Barangay Zone III (Poblacion)
- Barangay Zone IV (Poblacion)
- Barangay Zone V (Poblacion)
- Barangay Zone VI (Poblacion)
- Barangay Zone VII (Poblacion)
- Barangay Zone VIII (Poblacion)
- San Antonio
- San Buenaventura
- San Diego
- San Isidro
- San Jose
- San Juan
- San Luis
- San Pablo
- San Pedro
- San Rafael
- San Roque
- San Salvador
- Santo Domingo
- Santo Tomas

=== Climate ===
The climate is cold, humid, and tropical. The average yearly temperature is around 26 °C (78.8 °F).

Climate data for Luisiana, Laguna
| Month | Jan | Feb | Mar | Apr | May | Jun | Jul | Aug | Sep | Oct | Nov | Dec | Year |
|---|---|---|---|---|---|---|---|---|---|---|---|---|---|
| Mean daily maximum °C (°F) | 24 (75) | 25 (77) | 26 (79) | 29 (84) | 29 (84) | 28 (82) | 27 (81) | 27 (81) | 27 (81) | 26 (79) | 25 (77) | 24 (75) | 26 (80) |
| Mean daily minimum °C (°F) | 20 (68) | 20 (68) | 20 (68) | 21 (70) | 22 (72) | 22 (72) | 22 (72) | 22 (72) | 22 (72) | 21 (70) | 21 (70) | 20 (68) | 21 (70) |
| Average precipitation mm (inches) | 58 (2.3) | 41 (1.6) | 32 (1.3) | 29 (1.1) | 91 (3.6) | 143 (5.6) | 181 (7.1) | 162 (6.4) | 172 (6.8) | 164 (6.5) | 113 (4.4) | 121 (4.8) | 1,307 (51.5) |
| Average rainy days | 13.4 | 9.3 | 9.1 | 9.8 | 19.1 | 22.9 | 26.6 | 24.9 | 25.0 | 21.4 | 16.5 | 16.5 | 214.5 |
Source: Meteoblue

== Demographics ==
Population census of Luisiana
| Year | Pop. | ±% p.a. |
|---|---|---|
| 1903 | 4,174 | — |
| 1918 | 5,224 | +1.51% |
| 1939 | 6,963 | +1.38% |
| 1948 | 6,883 | −0.13% |
| 1960 | 8,746 | +2.02% |
| 1970 | 11,494 | +2.77% |
| 1975 | 12,346 | +1.44% |
| 1980 | 12,199 | −0.24% |
| 1990 | 14,241 | +1.56% |
| 1995 | 16,269 | +2.53% |
| 2000 | 17,109 | +1.09% |
| 2007 | 19,255 | +1.64% |
| 2010 | 20,148 | +1.66% |
| 2015 | 19,720 | −0.41% |
| 2020 | 20,859 | +1.19% |
| 2024 | 21,824 | +1.09% |
Source: Philippine Statistics Authority

In the 2024 census, the population of Luisiana, Laguna, was 21,824 people, with a density of 300 inhabitants per square kilometer or 780 inhabitants per square mile.

== Economy ==
Poverty incidence of Luisiana (%)

Source: Philippine Statistics Authority

Luisiana is basically an agricultural town. At the poblacion, there are only a few commercial establishments which cater to the basic services of the people. Most of them still go to Santa Cruz to do their shopping or marketing and to avail themselves of other services not available in their town.

Income sources of the people of Luisiana mainly include agriculture, such as copra, pandan, palay, bamboo and bunliw, with a light industry base and service-sector economy. Piggery and poultry farming are also an additional income.

== Education ==
The Luisiana Schools District Office governs all educational institutions within the municipality. It oversees the management and operations of all private and public, from primary to secondary schools.

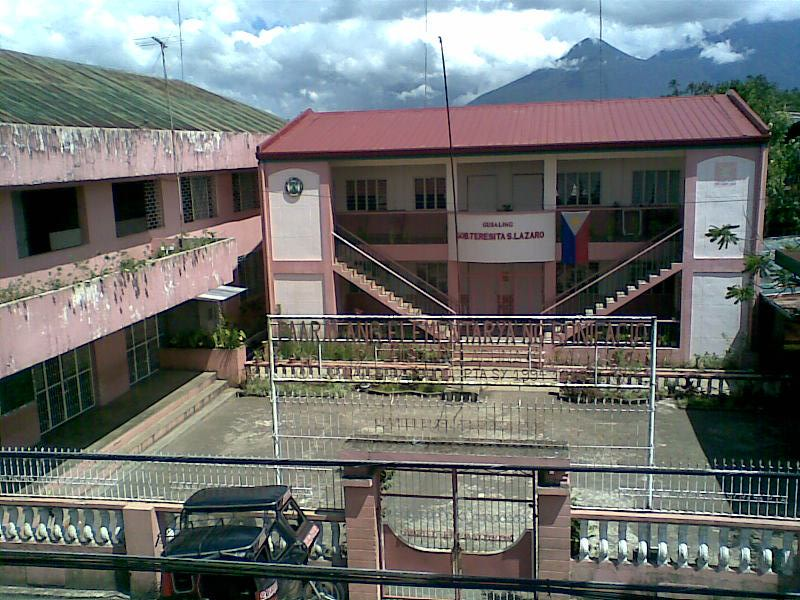
Bonifacio Elementary School

=== Primary and elementary schools ===
- Bonifacio Elementary School
- Dela Paz-San Pablo Elementary School
- Luisiana Adventist Elementary School
- Luisiana Central Elementary School
- San Antonio Elementary School
- San Buenaventura Elementary School
- San Isidro Elementary School
- San Rafael-San Roque Elementary School
- San Salvador Elementary School
- Sto. Domingo Elementary School
- UCCP Agape Child Development Center

Liceo de Luisiana, Our Lady of the Holy Rosary Parish Church and Plaza

=== Secondary schools ===
- Liceo de Luisiana
- Luis Bernardo Memorial High School
- Luisiana Integrated National High School (Formerly San Buenaventura National High School - Annex)
- San Buenaventura National High School

== Sister cities ==
- (Philippines) Makati
- (Philippines) Malaybalay City
- (Philippines) Guipos, Zamboanga del Sur
- (Philippines) Baguio

== Gallery ==
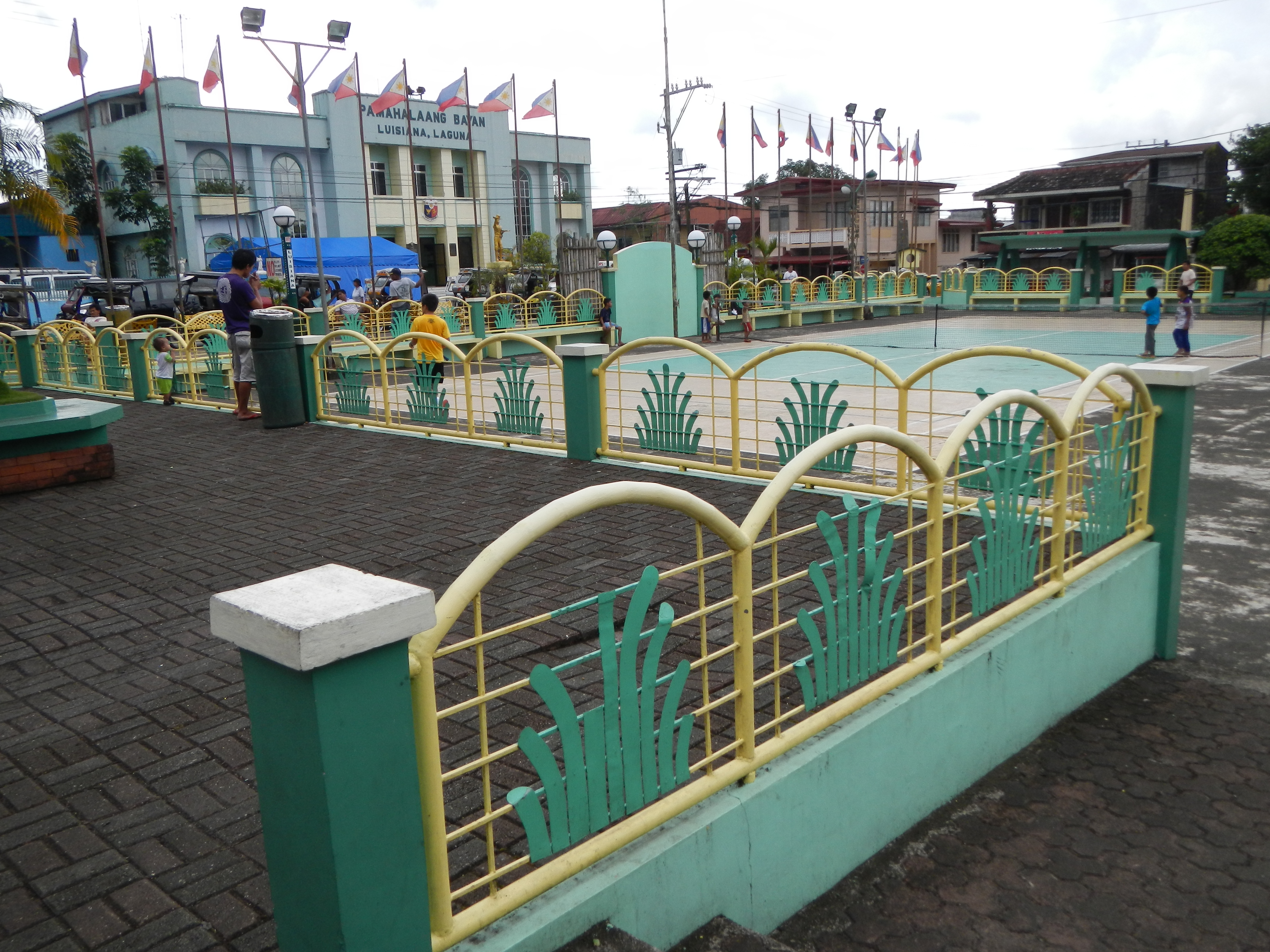
Plaza with Municipal Hall in background

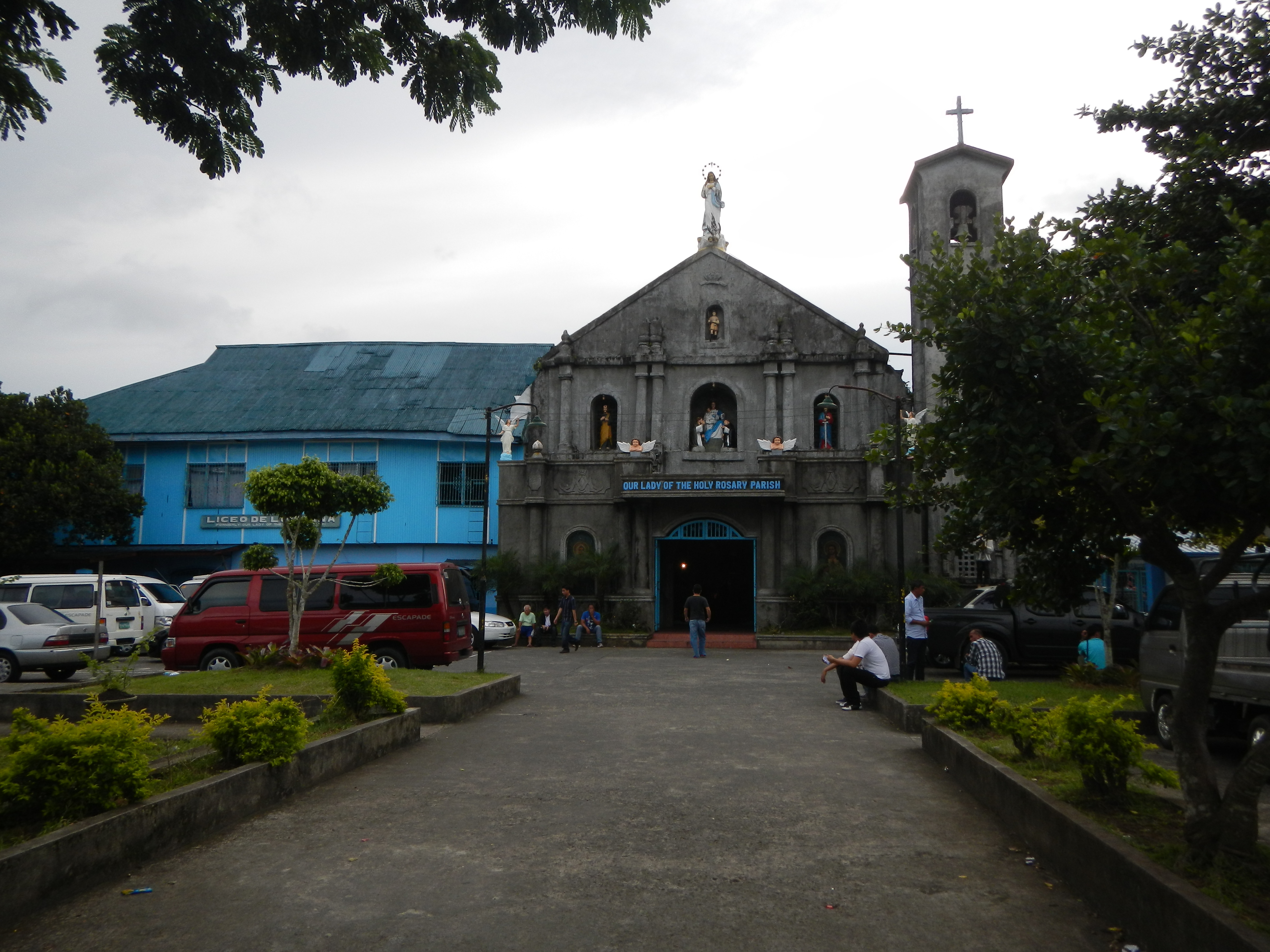
Luisiana Roman Catholic Church

Don Luis Bernárdo monument in front of the Municipal Hall

Hulugan Falls

== In popular culture ==
Luisiana will be the main setting of an upcoming video game titled Lost & Found.

Luisiana is also the main shooting location of the 2002 & 2017 Movies "Buko Pandan" and "Sinandomeng".
