= Victoria, Laguna =

Municipality in Laguna, Philippines

Victoria
- Municipality
- Municipality of Victoria
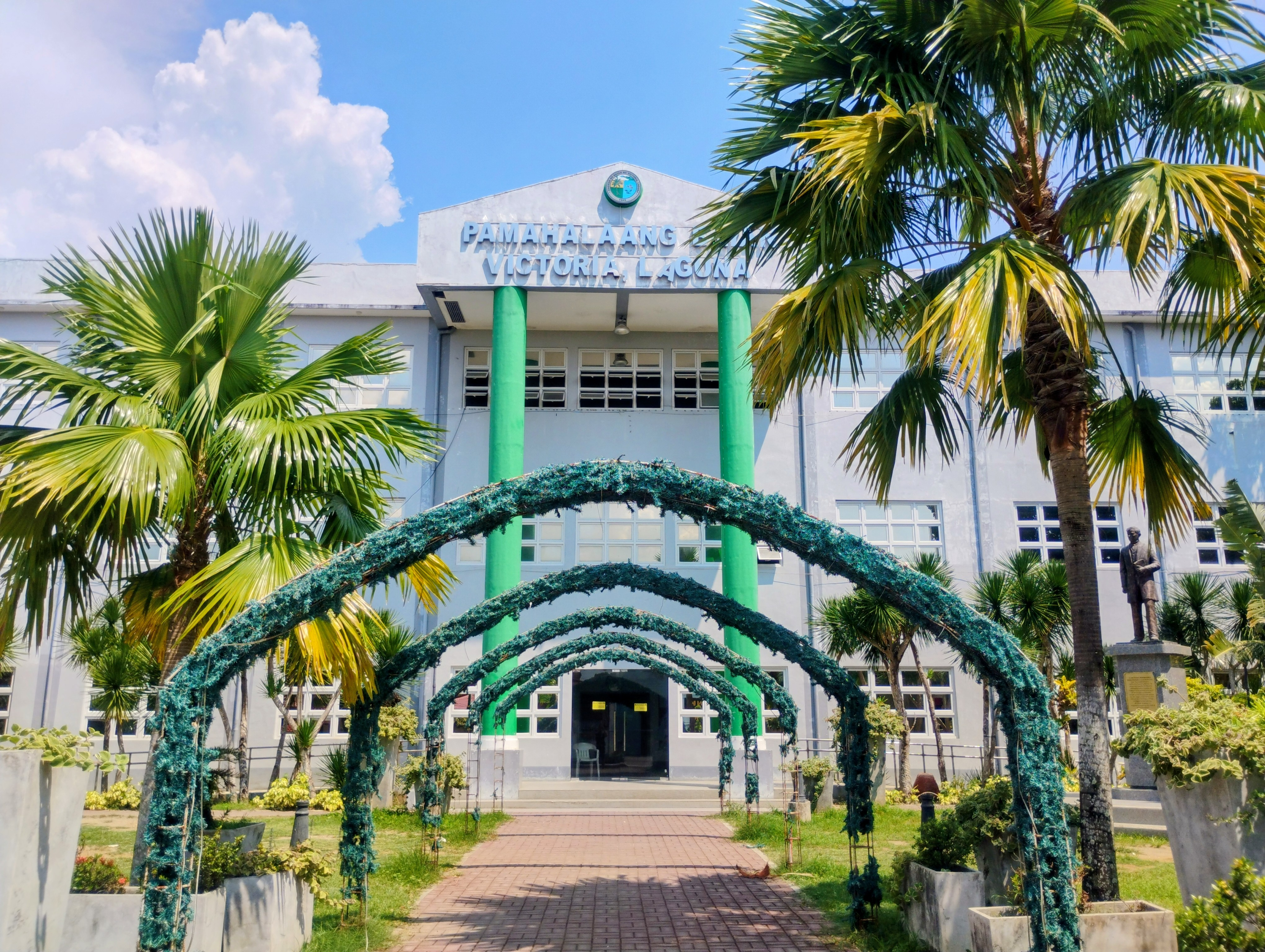
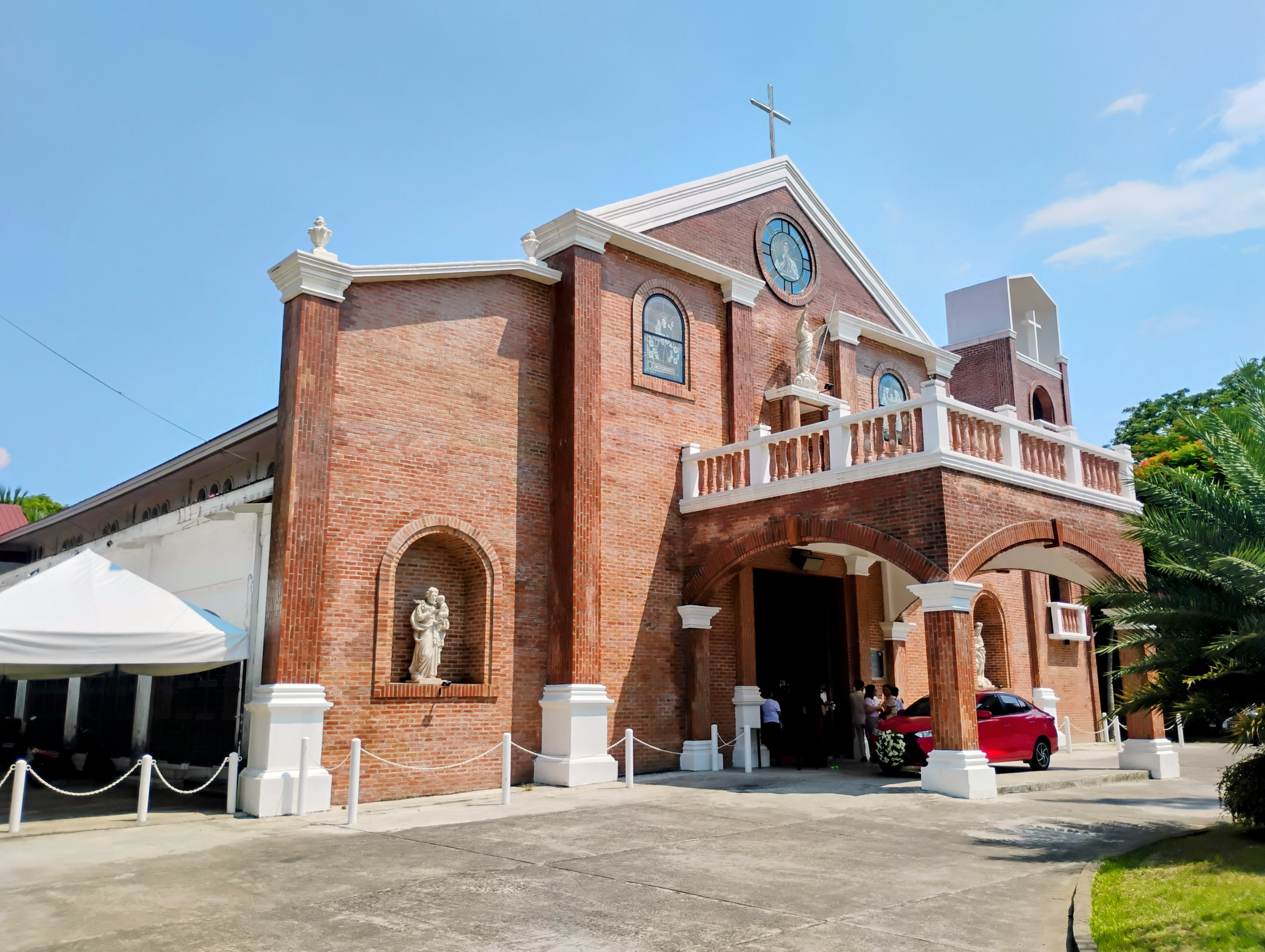
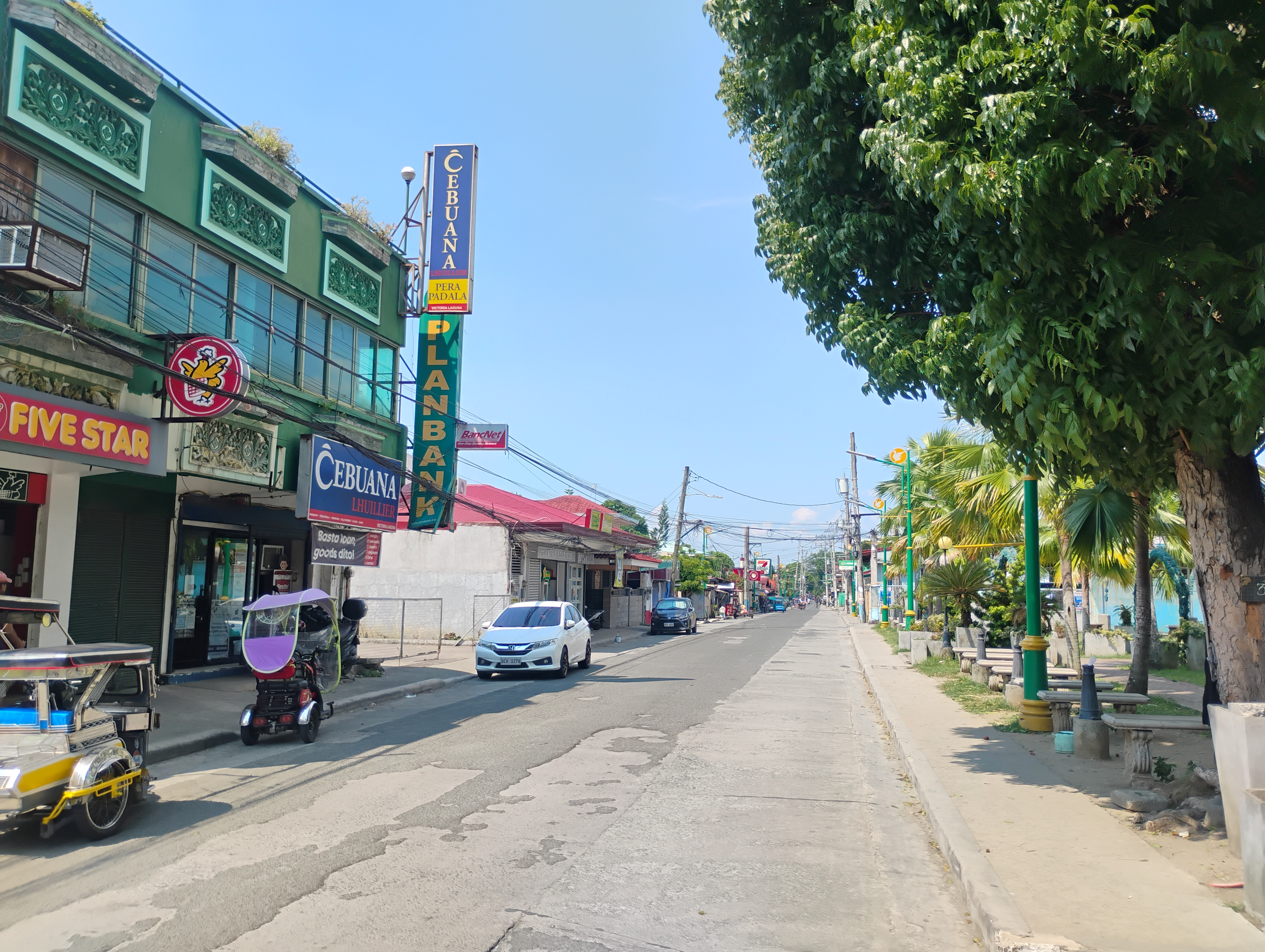
- Victoria Municipal Hall La Resurreccion Parish Church Victoria Town Proper

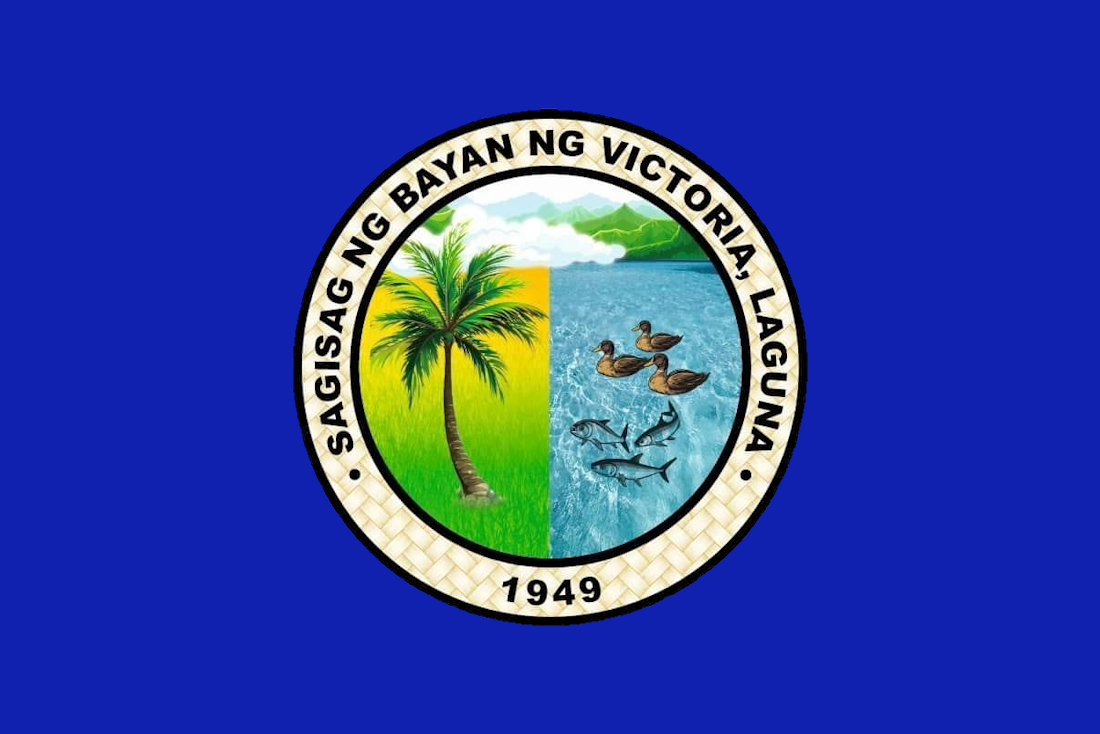
- Flag Seal
- Nickname: Duck Raising Capital of the Philippines
- Map of Laguna with Victoria highlighted
- Interactive map of Victoria
- Location within the Philippines
- Coordinates: 14°13′30″N 121°19′30″E
- Country: Philippines
- Region: Calabarzon
- Province: Laguna
- District: 3rd district
- Founded: November 15, 1949
- Named for: Victoria Quirino
- Barangays: 9 (see Barangays)

Government
  - Type: Sangguniang Bayan
  - Mayor: Dwight C. Kampitan
  - Vice Mayor: Recto D. Kampitan Jr.
  - Representative: Loreto Amante
  - Municipal Council: Members: Nicanot R. Pahutan; Jhon Paul D. Pahutan; Florencio M. Laraño; Analyn E. Nava; Prudencio Greviher L. Pahutan III; Efren H. Maloles; Ser David H. Martin; James Felix O. Rebong III
  - Electorate: 29,285 voters (2025)

Area
  - Total: 22.35 km^{2} (8.63 sq mi)
- Elevation: 14 m (46 ft)
- Highest elevation: 212 m (696 ft)
- Lowest elevation: 1 m (3.3 ft)

Population (2024 census)
  - Total: 45,230
  - Density: 2,024/km^{2} (5,241/sq mi)
  - Households: 11,943

Economy
  - Income class: 2nd municipal income class
  - Poverty incidence: 6.74% (2023)
  - Revenue: ₱ 180.7 million (2024)
  - Assets: ₱ 411.2 million (2024)
  - Expenditure: ₱ 74.09 million (2024)
  - Liabilities: ₱ 114 million (2024)

Service provider
  - Electricity: Manila Electric Company (Meralco)
- Time zone: UTC+8 (PST)
- ZIP code: 4011
- PSGC: 0403430000
- IDD : area code: +63 (0)49
- Native languages: Tagalog

Victoria, officially the Municipality of Victoria (Tagalog: Bayan ng Victoria), is a municipality in the province of Laguna, Philippines. According to the 2024 census, it has a population of 45,230 people. Large amounts of ducks are reared in the municipality, with an annual festival celebrating the town's founding anniversary dedicated to the animal.

== Etymology ==
The name Victoria, meaning "victory" in English, comes from the Spanish language. It was named after Victoria Quirino, the daughter of former President Elpidio Quirino, under whose presidency the municipality was established. The younger Quirino also served as the First Lady, as her father was a widower.

== History ==
Prominent citizens and civic leaders found new hope to make Nanhaya, then a barrio of Pila, a town when the Americans granted the Philippines independence in 1946. They revived the move to separate from Pila. During this time, citizens proposed to name the town Trinidad, after the young republic's First Lady, the wife of then-President Manuel Roxas. Strong opposition shelved the proposal once more.

After Roxas's death, Elpidio Quirino took over the presidency. Nanhaya's residents remained undaunted. They tried once more, intensifying the campaign. The Fernandez clan, the town's most prominent and wealthiest family, including Judge Jose Fernandez, then Mayor Alejandro Fernandez and Atty. Ramon H. Fernandez Sr., as well as Andres Franco, Dr. Agrifino Oca, Gregorio Herradura, and Leonardo Rebong, stood for the proposal. On November 15, 1949, President Elpidio Quirino signed into effect Executive Order No. 282, segregating barrios Nanhaya, Bancabanca, Daniw, Masapang, San Benito, San Felix, San Francisco and San Roque from Pila and forming a new independent municipality.

After Pateros became highly urbanized and densely populated, Victoria became a destination of balut traders and became the "Duck Raising Center of the Philippines". The town was featured as the detour challenge of Leg 11 of the 5th Season of The Amazing Race. Victoria celebrates the Itik Festival every second week of November.

The municipal seat of Pila was once located in Barangay Pagalangan, now one of Victoria's barangays. The remains of Pila's original parish church can still be found in Pagalangan, which in the past made that community a target of treasure hunters seeking antiques. Pagalangan ceased to be Pila's capital when the town center was relocated due to frequent flooding.

== Geography ==
Victoria is located along the southeastern shore of Laguna de Bay, 76 kilometers (47 mi) south of Manila and 11 kilometers (6.8 mi) from Santa Cruz. It is bordered by the municipalities of Calauan to the southwest, Nagcarlan to the southeast and Pila to the northeast.

=== Barangays ===
Victoria is politically subdivided into 9 barangays, as indicated below. Each barangay consists of puroks and some have sitios.

Currently, there are two barangays which are classified as urban (highlighted in bold).

- Banca-banca
- Daniw
- Masapang
- **Nanhaya (Poblacion)**
- Pagalangan
- San Benito
- San Felix
- San Francisco
- **San Roque (Poblacion)**

== Demographics ==
Population census of Victoria
Year	Pop.	±% p.a.
1960	8,922	—
1970	12,741	+3.62%
1975	13,810	+1.63%
1980	16,522	+3.65%
1990	21,847	+2.83%
1995	25,424	+2.88%
2000	29,765	+3.44%
2007	33,829	+1.78%
2010	34,604	+0.83%
2015	39,321	+2.46%
2020	43,408	+2.10%
2024	45,230	+0.99%
Source: Philippine Statistics Authority

In the 2024 census, the population of Victoria was 45,230 people, with a density of 2,000 inhabitants per square kilometer or 5,200 inhabitants per square mile.

== Economy ==
Poverty incidence of Victoria (%)

Source: Philippine Statistics Authority

== Ducks ==
The municipality is known as the duck-raising capital of the Philippines. Following the town's nickname, the Itik (duck) Festival is celebrated on the town's founding anniversary. Through Presidential Proclamation 663, October 14, 2024 was declared a special non-working day in celebration of its 75th Founding Anniversary and the 23rd Itik Festival.

== Government ==
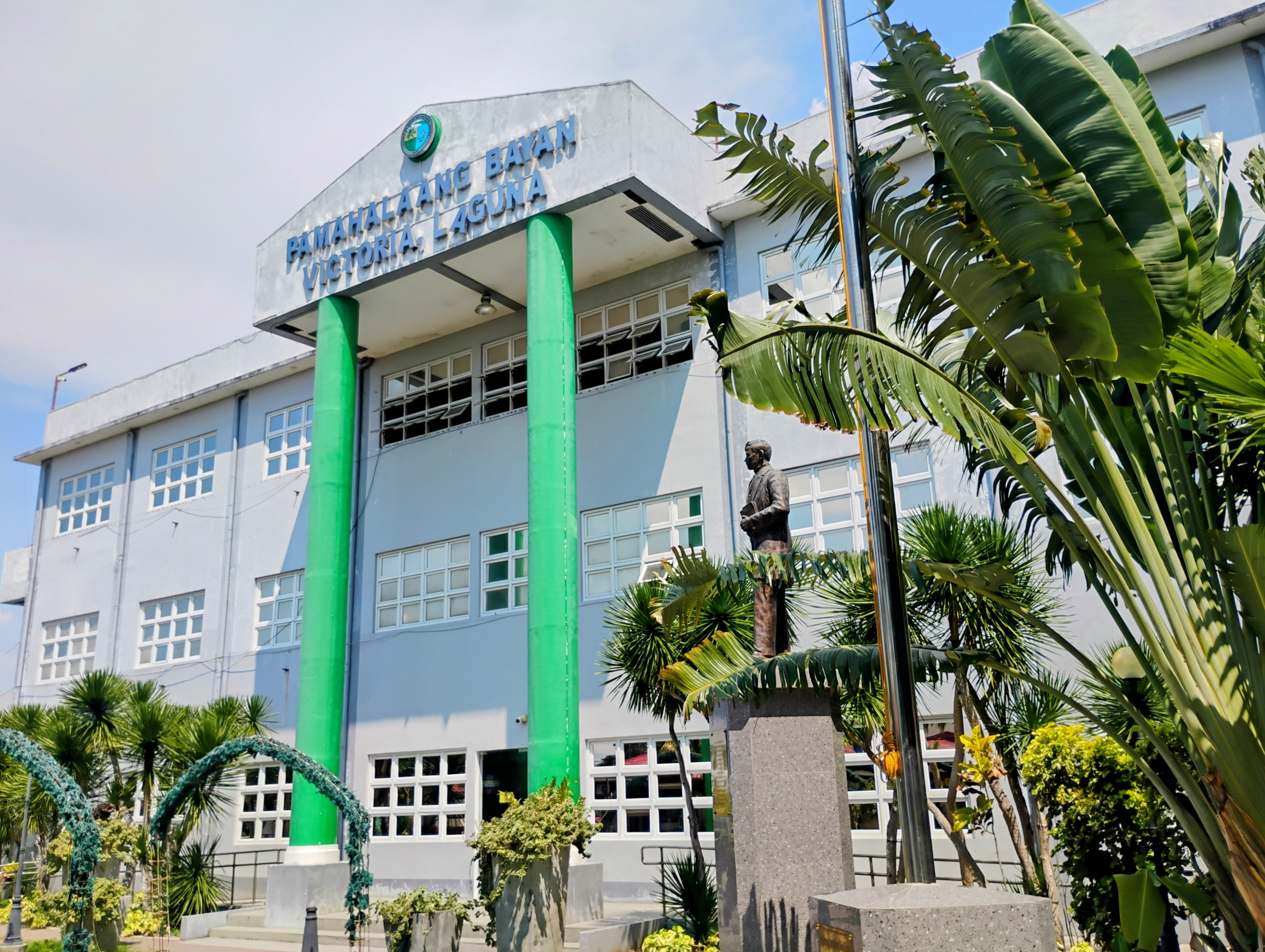
Victoria Town Hall

=== Elected officials ===
Victoria municipal officials (2022–2025)
Name	Party
Mayor
Dwight C. Kampitan	Nacionalista
Vice Mayor
RJ Kampitan	Nacionalista
Municipal Councilors
Florencio M. Laraño	Nacionalista
Wilfredo Herradura	PDP–Laban
Giland Perez	PDP–Laban
Homer Herradura	Nacionalista
Sonny Lazaro	PDP–Laban
Analyn Nava	Independent
Jhon Paul D. Pahutan	Aksyon
SD Martin	PDP–Laban
Ex Officio Municipal Council Members
**ABC President**	Leoncio S. Fajardo (San Francisco)
**SK President**	John Patrick S. Cambe (Masapang)
**SB Secretary**	Caylene T. Fernandez

== Education ==
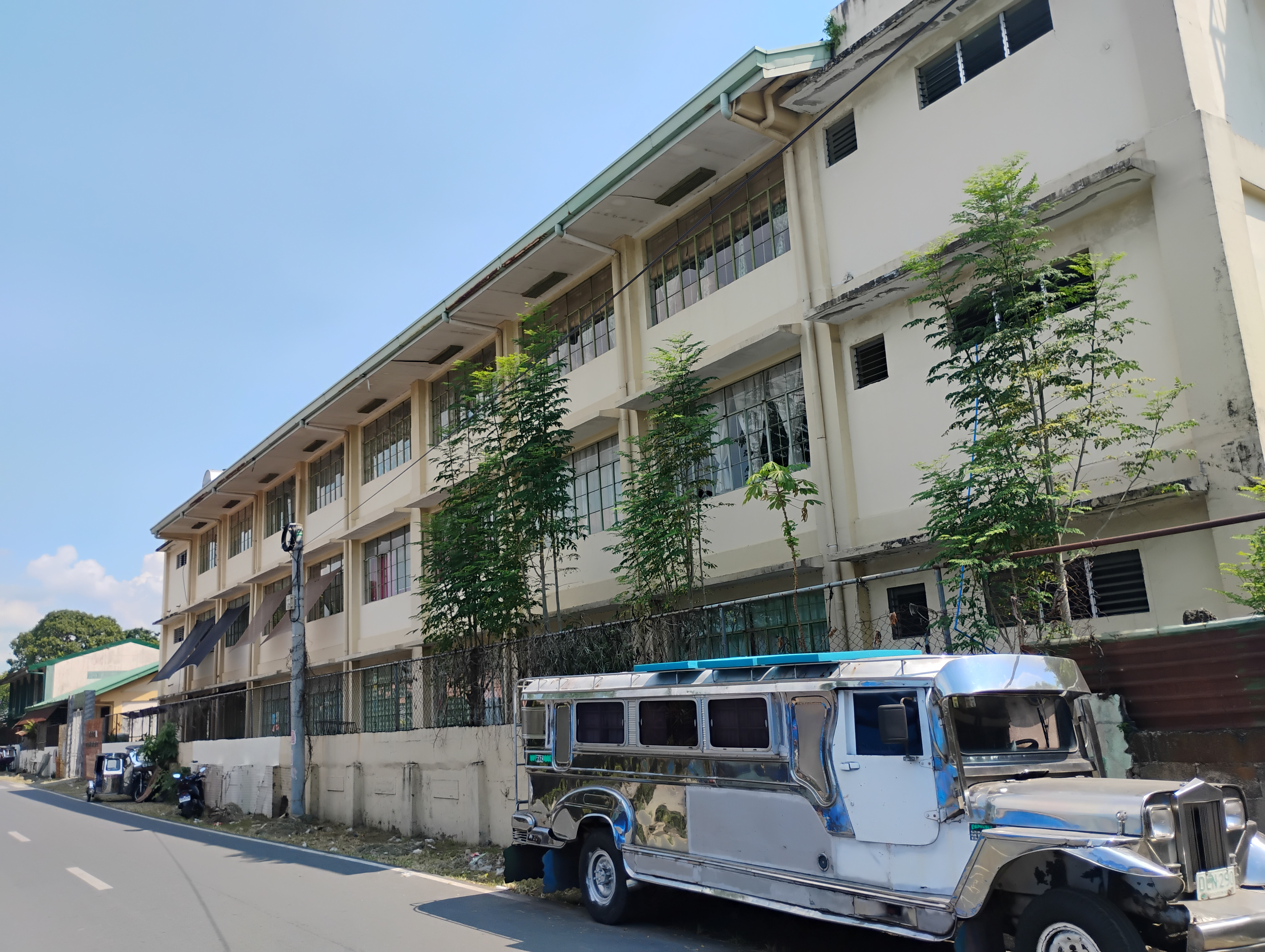
Victoria Elementary School

The Victoria Schools District Office governs all educational institutions within the municipality. It oversees the management and operations of all private and public schools from the primary to the secondary levels.

=== Primary and elementary schools ===
- Banca-Banca Elementary School
- Daniw Elementary School (Banca-Banca Extension)
- G. Herradura Elementary School
- Jesus The Only Messiah SChool of Wisdom
- Maranatha Christian Academy-Victoria
- Masapang Elementary School
- Missionari Della Fede Community Learning Center
- Pagalangan Elementary School
- San Benito Elementary School
- San Felix Elementary School
- San Francisco Elementary School
- T. Daguinsin Elementary School
- Victoria Elementary School

=== Secondary schools ===
- Banca-Banca Integrated National High School
- Masapang National High School
- Nanhaya National High School
- San Benito National High School
- San Francisco Integrated NHS
- San Roque National High School

=== Higher educational institution ===
- Moreh Global Innovative College
- Victoria Senior High School
