= Punta, Calamba =

Punta Punta
- Rural Barangay
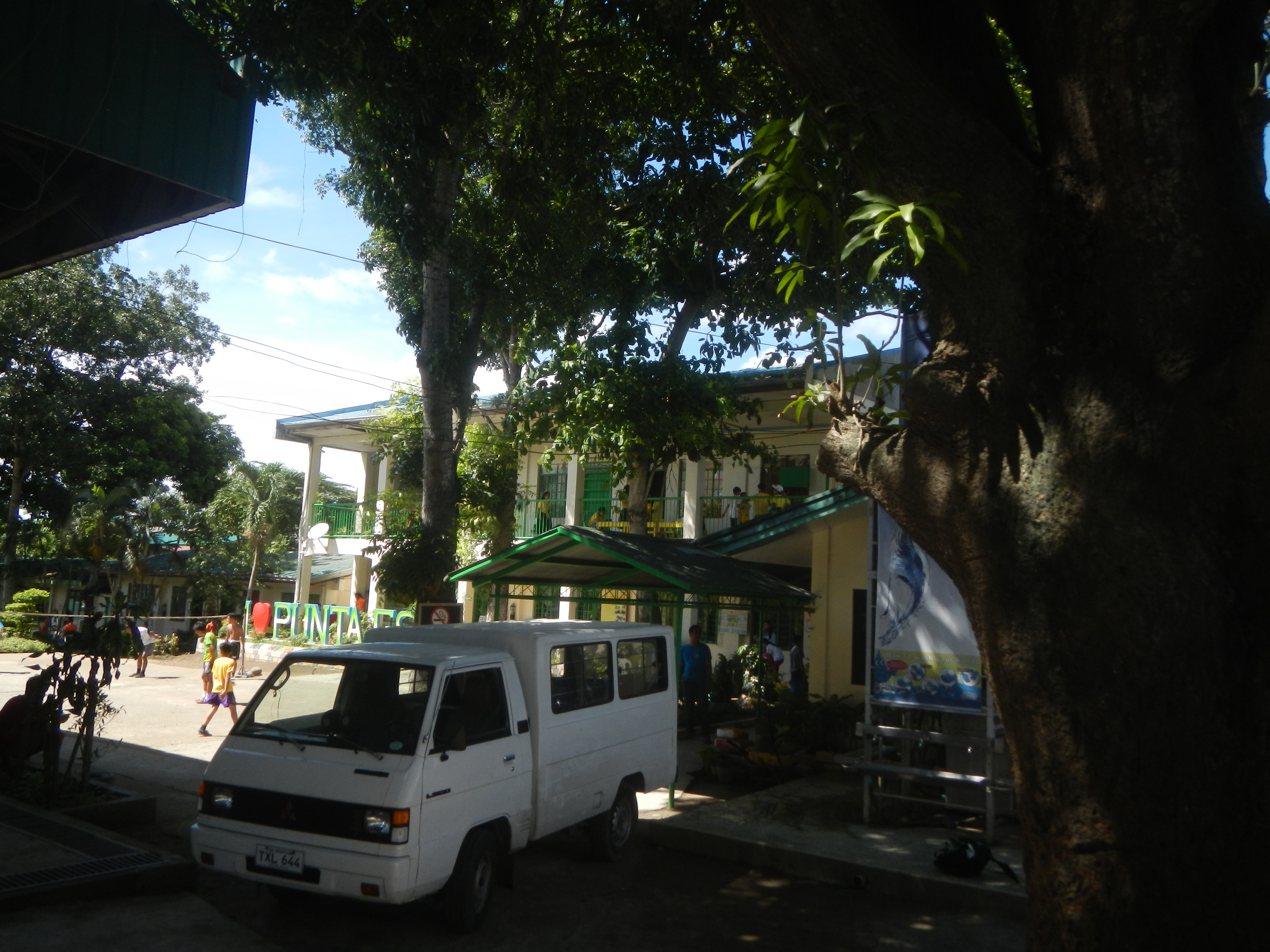
- A Punta Elementary School (Calamba)

- Seal
- Coordinates: 14°10′40″N 121°7′14″E
- Country: Philippines
- Province: Laguna
- Region: Calabarzon (Region IV-A)
- City: Calamba
- Number of Puroks: 6

Government
  - Chairman: Justino Perez Carandang
  - Councilors: Amelia Lanceta Reyes; Efren Lalap; Cesar Malabanan Samiano; Myra Perez Lanceta; Romeo Villanueva Dela Guardia; Rechie Yaneza Villanueva; Demetria Dimapilis Cabato

Area
  - Land: 3.31 km^{2} (1.28 sq mi)

Population
  - Total: 8,639
- Time zone: UTC+8 (PST)
  - Summer (DST): UTC+8 (not observed)
- Postal code: 4027
- Area code: 49

Punta is a rural barangay of Calamba, Laguna in the Philippines. It is situated in the central-south portion of the city.

== Geography ==
Barangay Punta is located in the western part of Calamba. The barangay is bordered by: Kay-Anlog in the south; Bubuyan in the west; Milagrosa in the east, Palo-Alto in the north-west and Barandal in the north. It has a total land area of 331 hectares. Punta is now an industrial barangay in Calamba and it extends into barangay Prinza. The Filinvest Technology Park in Ciudad de Calamba Barangay Punta is under the PEZA Philippine Economic Zone Authority . Some of the manufacturing company inside the economic zone are the EXELPACK CORPORATION, a packaging company own by a Filipino businessman, Fabtech, Primatech, Cleanpack, Auro a local chocolate manufacturer and some other under PEZA company. Punta is approximately 3 kilometers from barangay Mayapa and 2.5 kilometers from CPIP Calamba Premier International Park in barangay Batino. Some of the exclusive subdivisions in Ciudad de Calamba owned by the Filinvest Land are the Montebllo and Punta Alteza.

== Demography ==
According to 2007 Census, Punta has a population of 2,615, one of the least-populated barangays in Calamba

Population census of Punta
Year	Pop.	±% p.a.
1918	380	—
1990	1,108	+1.50%
1995	1,214	+1.73%
2000	1,555	+5.45%
2010	3,511	+8.49%
2015	4,175	+3.35%
2020	7,321	+12.55%
2024	8,639	+4.05%
Source: Philippine Statistics Authority
