= Calamba =

Calamba may refer to:

- Calamba, Laguna, a city in the Philippines
  - Calamba Poblacion, a barangay district in Calamba, Laguna
  - Calamba Island, an island in the city of Calamba situated at the Laguna de Bay
  - Calamba railway station in Calamba, Laguna
  - Calamba Claypot, a giant water pot in Calamba
  - Calamba Doctors' Hospital, a hospital in Calamba, Laguna
  - Calamba Premiere International Park, an industrial park in Calamba
  - Calamba Bayside National High School, a National High School in Calamba Bayside
- Calamba, Misamis Occidental, a municipality in the Philippines

== See also ==
- Kalamba, another name for tapayan earthen jars in the Tagalog language
- Kalamba, a town in Kenya
