= Calamba City Hall =

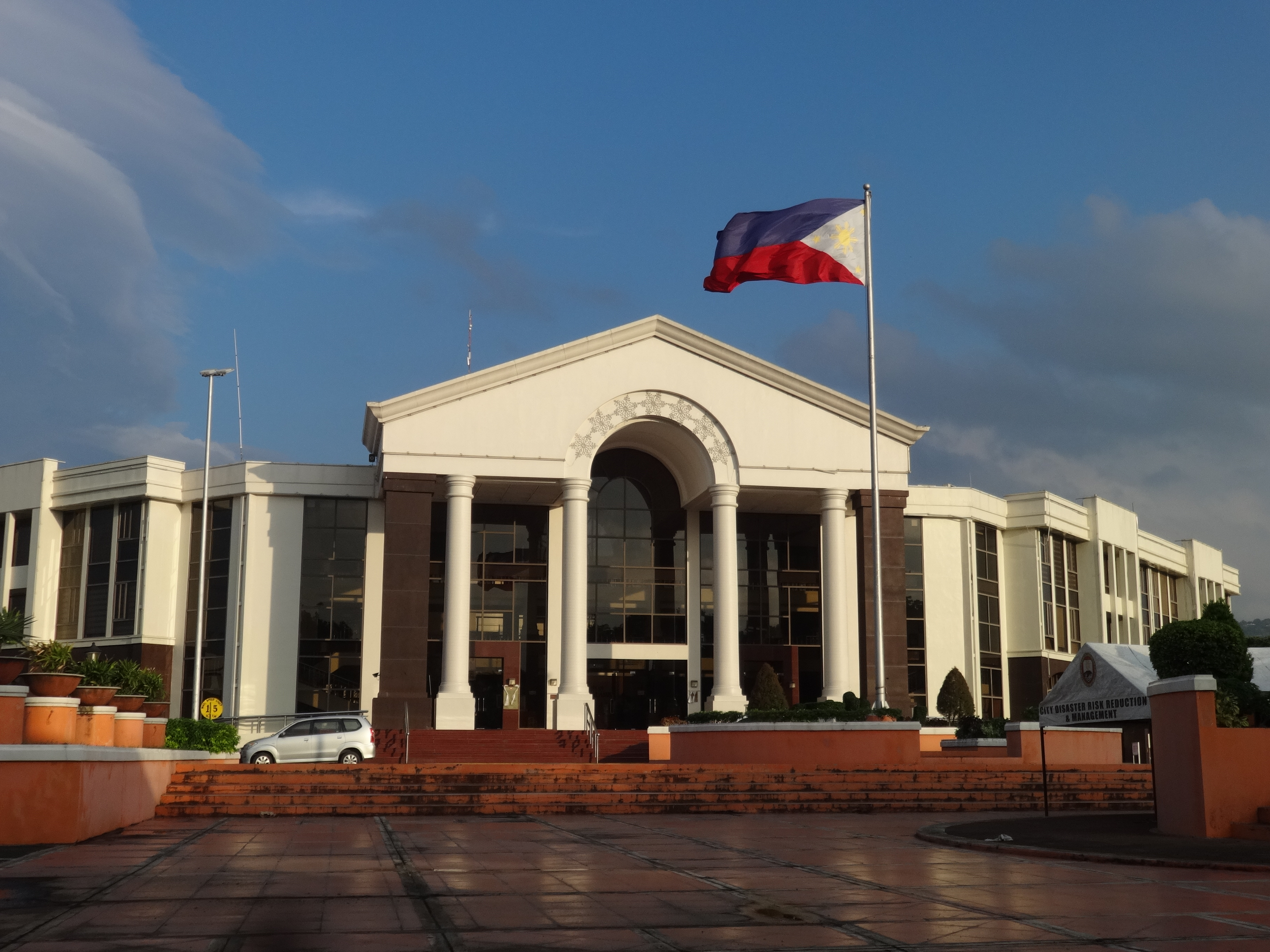
- The Calamba City Hall as seen from the front of Jose Rizal Plaza
- Interactive map of the Calamba City Hall area

General information
- Status: Completed
- Type: Government building
- Location: New City Hall Complex. Chipeco Avenue Extra, Brgy. Real, Calamba, Laguna, Philippines
- Coordinates: 14°11′38″N 121°09′36″E
- Completed: April 2, 2009
- Opening: 2010
- Owner: City of Calamba
- Management: City of Calamba

Height
- Roof: Octagon roof

Technical details
- Floor count: 3
- Lifts/elevators: 4

Design and construction
- Developer: City of Calamba

The Calamba City Hall (Filipino: Gusaling Panlungsod ng Calamba), officially the City Hall of Calamba is located in the plaza of Calamba, Laguna in the Philippines. It is where the mayor of the city holds office and the chambers in the Calamba City Council., The old Calamba City Hall was located near the St. John the Baptist Parish Church and the Calamba Claypot which is the current site of City College of Calamba.

== Etymology ==
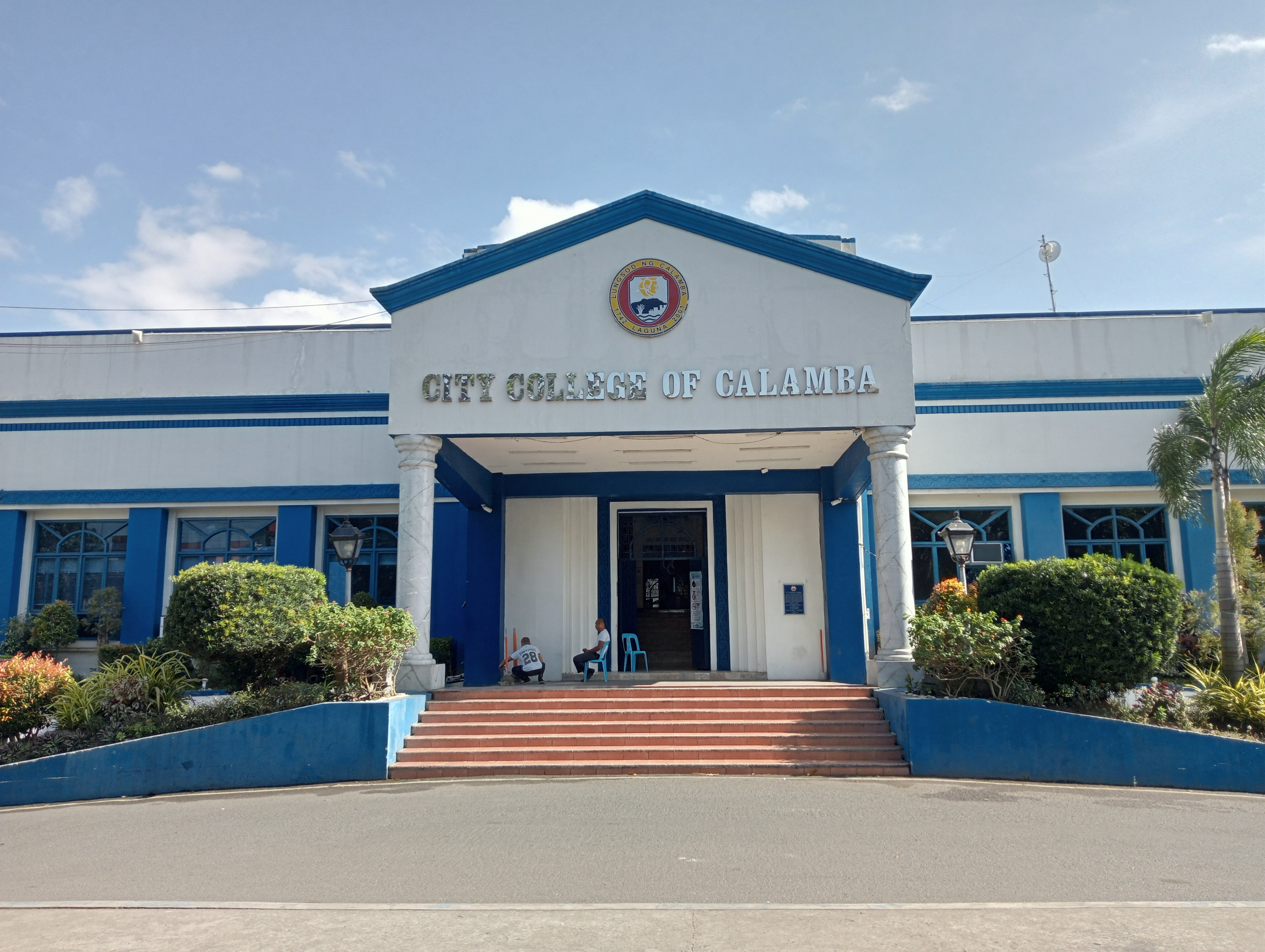
Old City Hall currently the City College of Calamba

The Calamba City Hall, built in 2009, is made from Octagon-pine which holds the front and the back of the city hall. The Calamba City Council decided to design the new hall into an octagon shape, believed to be a unique city hall in the Philippines in the 21st century, which represents Calamba City as the new Regional Center of Region 4-A Calabarzon in the year 2003, followed by Lucena City in Quezon.

== See also ==
- Calamba Church
- Calamba Claypot
- Rizal Shrine
