= Lisp (disambiguation) =

A lisp is a type of speech impediment.

Lisp or LISP may also refer to:

== Computing ==
- Lisp (programming language), a family of computer programming languages
- Locator/Identifier Separation Protocol, a "map-and-encapsulate" Internet protocol

== Other uses ==
- Lisp (band), an English trip hop band
- Lisp (group), the Japanese girl group
- Light Industry and Science Park, a series of industrial parks in the Philippines

== See also ==
- Lisp Machines, a company that built Lisp machines out of MIT
- Lisp machine, general-purpose computers designed to efficiently run Lisp
- Rhotacism (speech impediment), 'lisp' on the letter R
