= Calamba Poblacion =

Poblacion District Calamba, Laguna
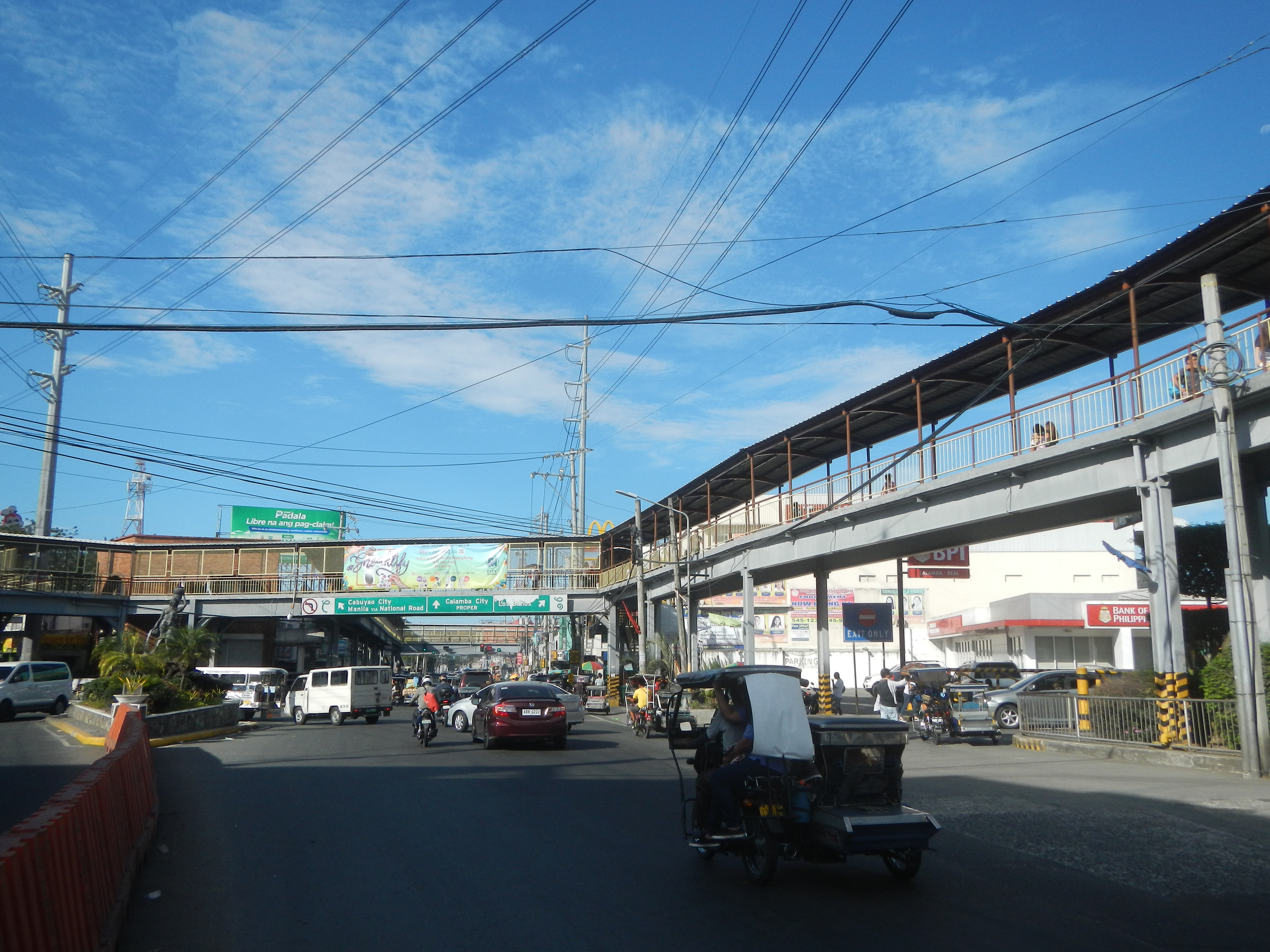
- A Crossing-Calamba City as seen from SM City of Calamba
- Country: Philippines
- Region: Calabarzon (Region IV-A)
- Province: Laguna
- City: Calamba
- Barangay: Poblacion Calamba

Area
  - Land: 2.303 km^{2} (0.889 sq mi)

Population (2022)
  - Total: 33,411
  - Density: 14,510/km^{2} (37,570/sq mi)
- Time zone: UTC+8 (Philippine Standard Time)
- ZIP code: 4027
- Area code: 050
- Spoken languages: (mostly) Tagalog
- Feast: June 19 – Buhayani Festival

Calamba Poblacion, is a urbanized barangay district located at the east edge, in the city of Calamba, Laguna, Philippines. This district comprises seven barangays, Barangay I, II, III, IV, V, VI, VII. The Calamba Poblacion is bounded of Calamba River between Parian.

== Population ==
No	Barangay	Land Area (hectares)	Population (2024)	Population (2020)
1	Barangay I	29.2	4,767	5,823
2	Barangay II	17.1	11,053	10,627
3	Barangay III	29.8	4,060	4,537
4	Barangay IV	4.5	3,230	3,301
5	Barangay V	25.6	5,384	5,858
6	Barangay VI	42.3	2,757	1,693
7	Barangay VII	81.8	2,160	2,357

== Gallery ==
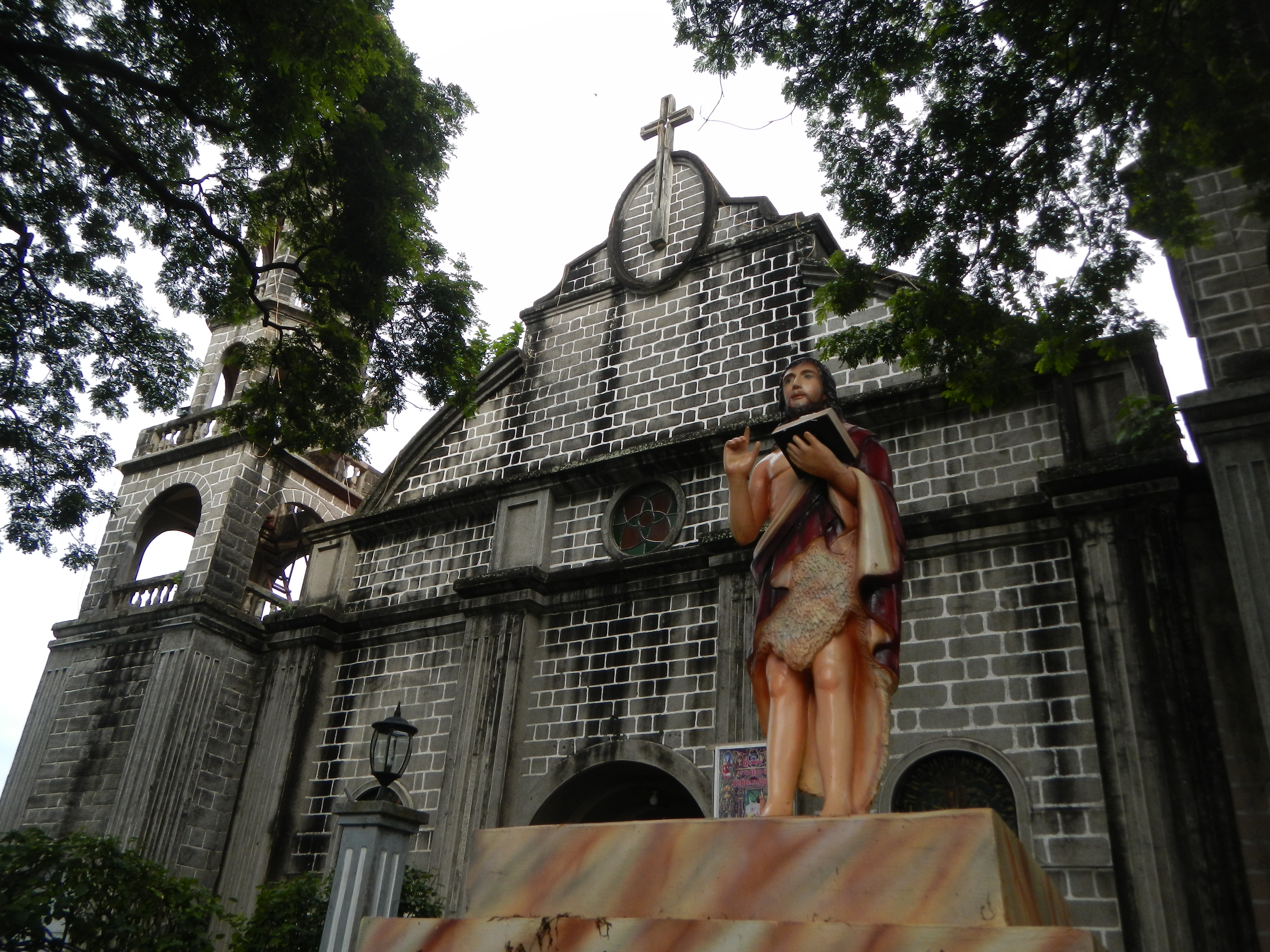
Saint John Baptist Parish in (Pob. 5)

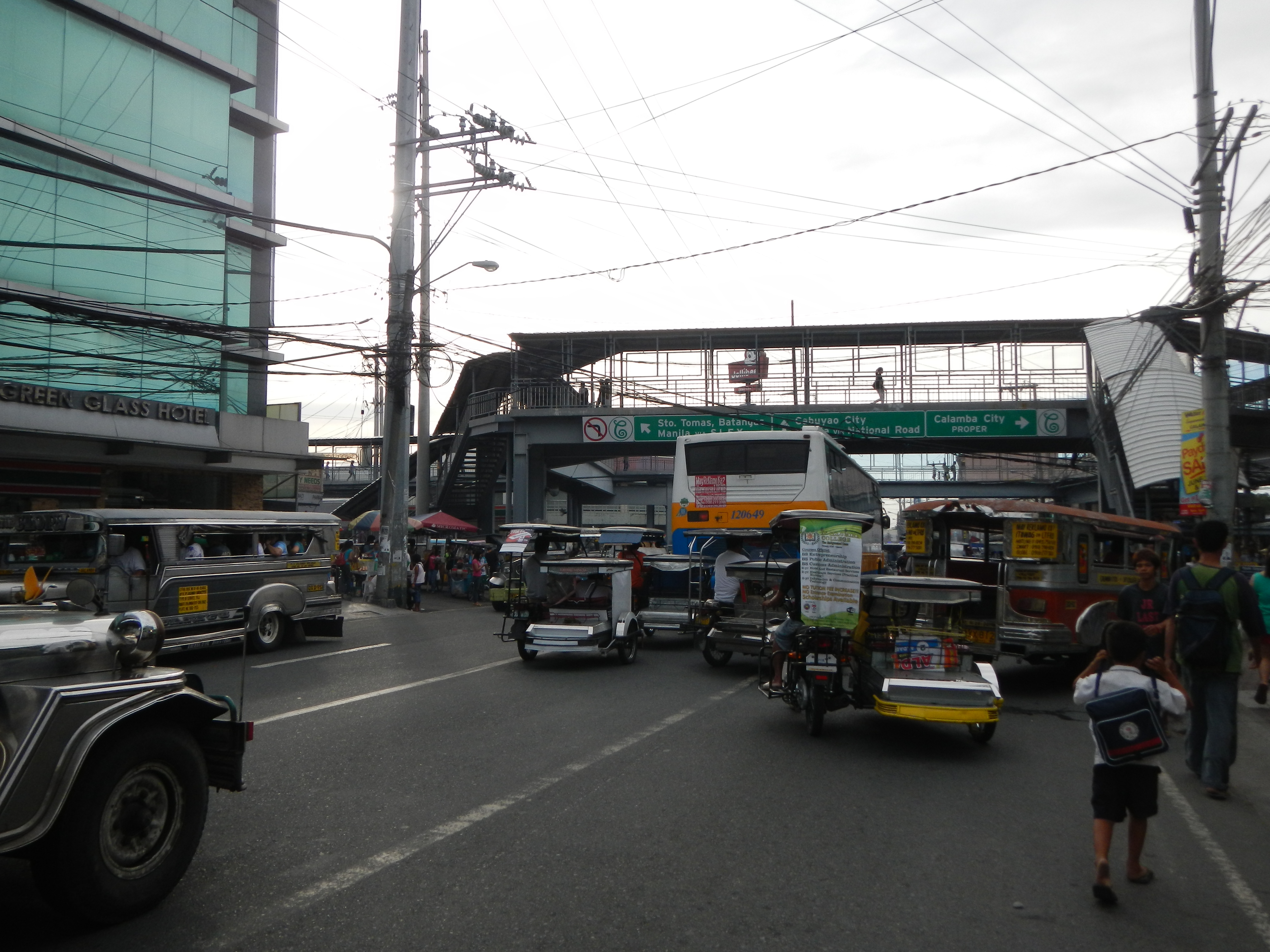
A crossing in (Pob. 1)

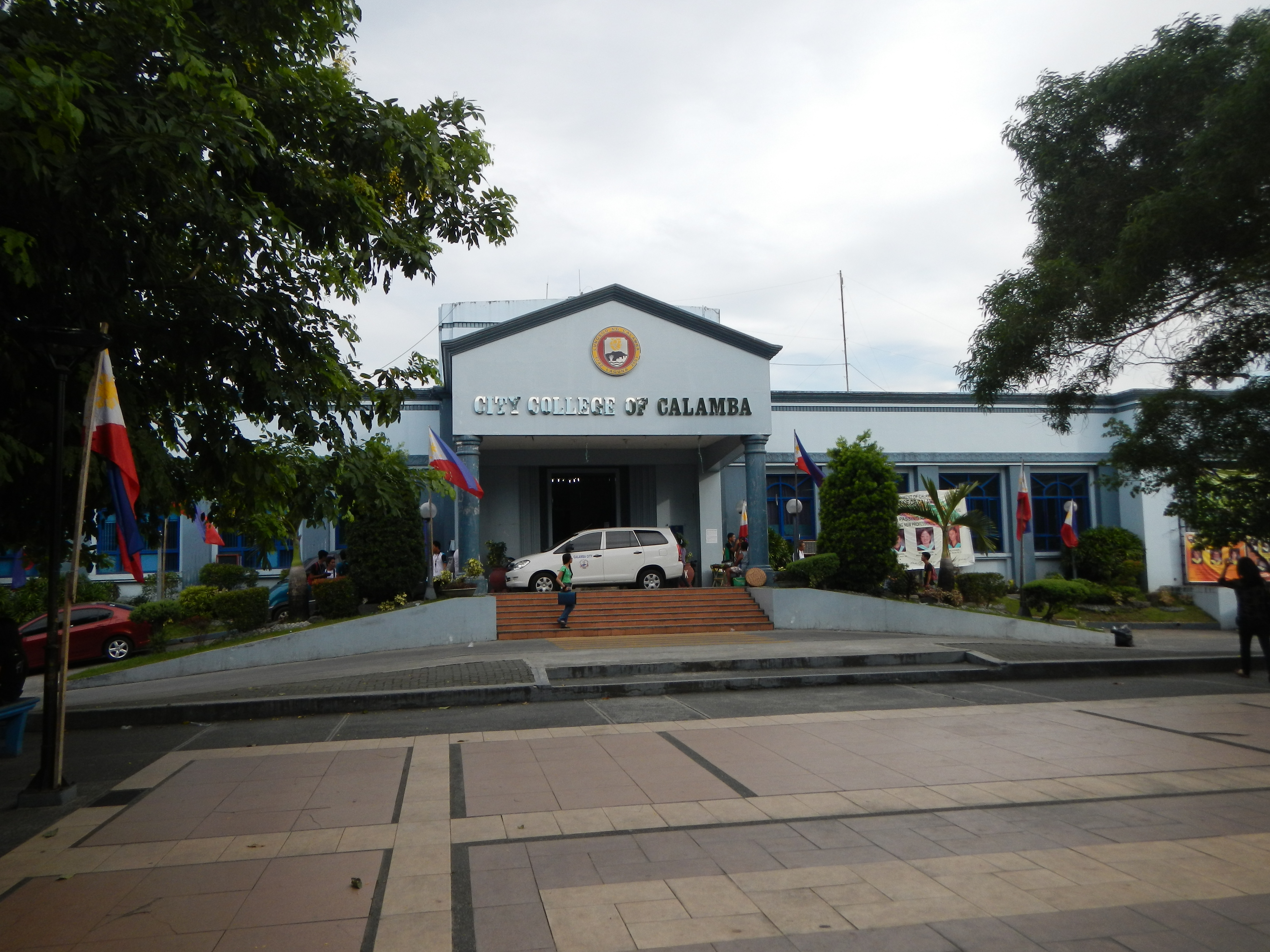
City College of Calamba in (Pob. 5)

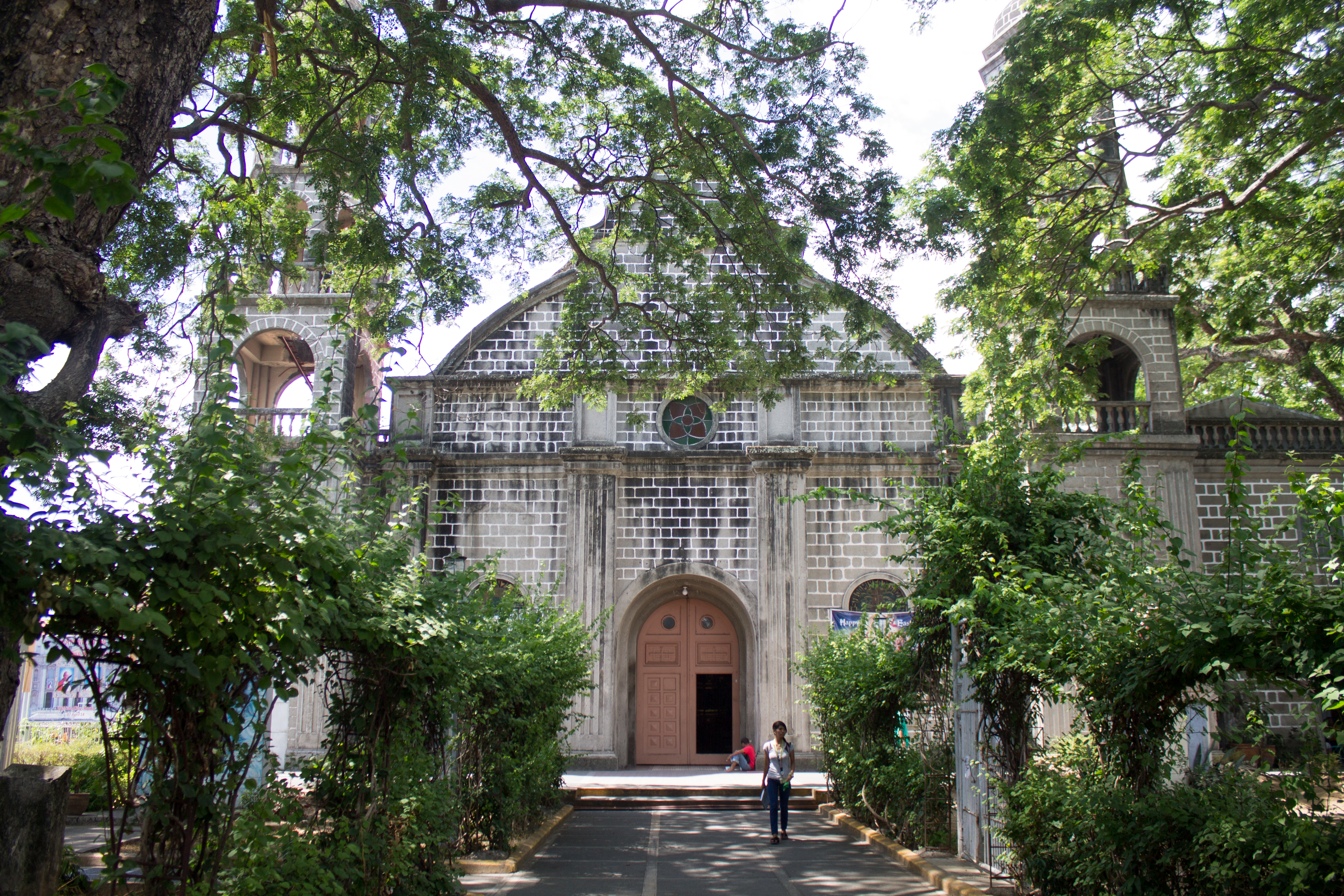
A Calamba Church (Saint John Baptist, Parish Church)

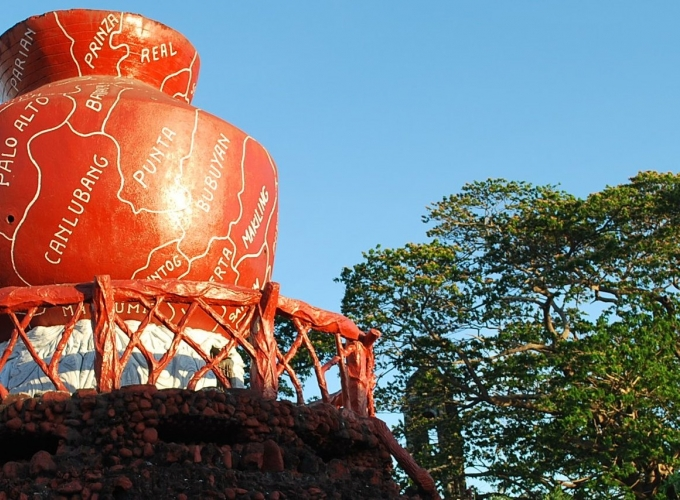
Calamba Claypot in (Pob. 5)

== See also ==
- Rizal Shrine (Calamba)
- Calamba Claypot
