= Turbina, Calamba =

Turbina
- Barangay
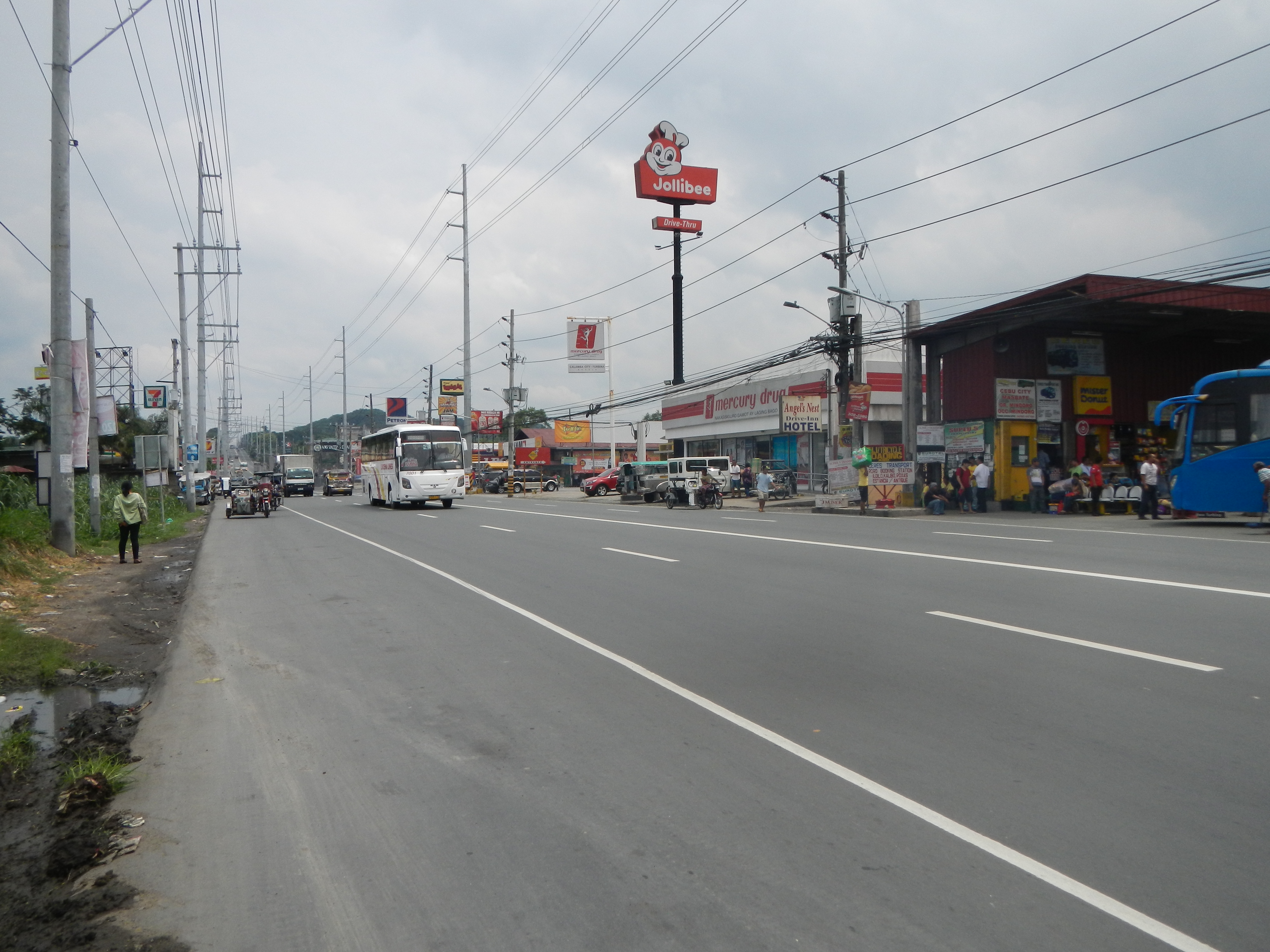
- Maharlika Highway in Turbina

- Seal
- Coordinates: 14°11′16″N 121°08′21″E
- Country: Philippines
- Province: Laguna
- Region: Calabarzon (Region IV-A)
- City: Calamba
- Puroks: 5

Government
  - Barangay: Rodel V. Manalo
  - Councilors: Isabelita M. Dela Cruz; Noriel R. Bustillo; Reynaldo C. De Leon; Virgilio M. Ocampo; Bernan A. Tagapan; John Regine B. Paral; Gregorio A. Mesina

Area
  - Land: 0.515 km^{2} (0.199 sq mi)

Population (2024)
  - Total: 5,541
  - Density: 10,800/km^{2} (27,900/sq mi)

Turbina is an urban barangay of Calamba in Laguna. It is geographically situated in the south of the city. Turbina is known for the barangay terminal station of Calamba, located at the Maharlika Highway, which is accessible by South Luzon Expressway's Calamba Exit. It is a major hotspot for transportation, such as buses, jeepneys, and vans.

== Neighboring barangays ==
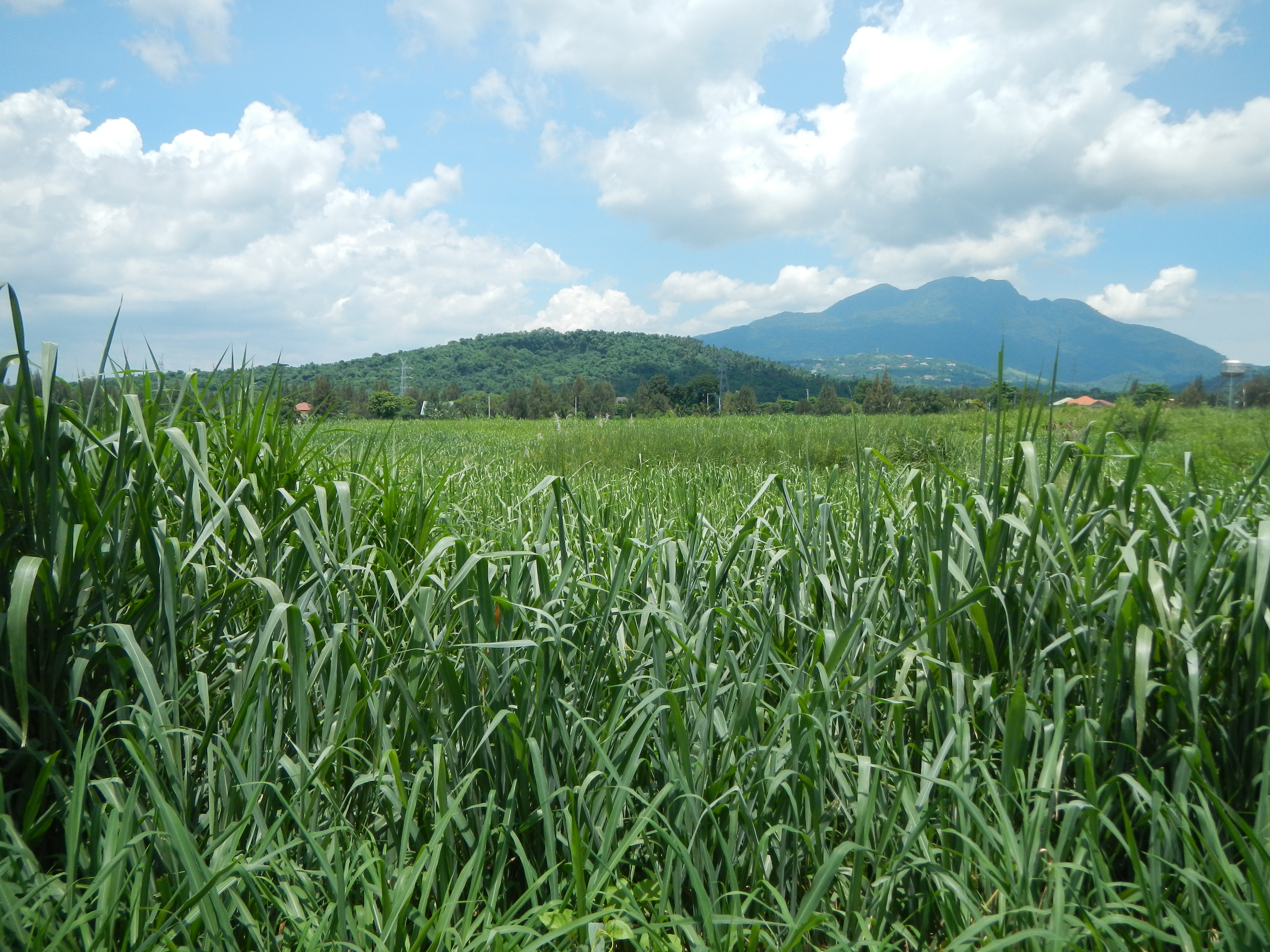
A green field in Turbina

Directions	Barangays
West	Barandal
East	Real,
South	Milagrosa
North	Prinza

Population census of Brgy. Turbina
Year	Pop.	±% p.a.
1980	607	—
1990	1,384	+8.59%
1995	1,482	+1.29%
2000	2,143	+8.23%
2007	3,677	+7.73%
2010	4,051	+3.59%
2015	4,191	+0.65%
2020	6,268	+8.84%
2024	5,541	−2.92%

== Transportation ==
Turbina is a major transportation hub in Calamba, and serves as a hotspot, hubs, and fuel stops for buses, jeepneys, vans, etc. Turbina is situated next to SLEX, making multiple routes from other areas such as Batangas, Metro Manila, and Bicol, creating more demands, and customers.

Buses

Buses are a major transportation in Turbina from multiple bus companies, such as DLTBCo, Philtranco, Bicol Isarog, Bobis Liner, Raymond, Superlines, JAC Liner, Peñafrancia, and other small bus commuters; most who have built their own bus terminals to serve routes such as Laguna, Batangas, Metro Manila, and Bicol. DLTB is also headquartered at Turbina.

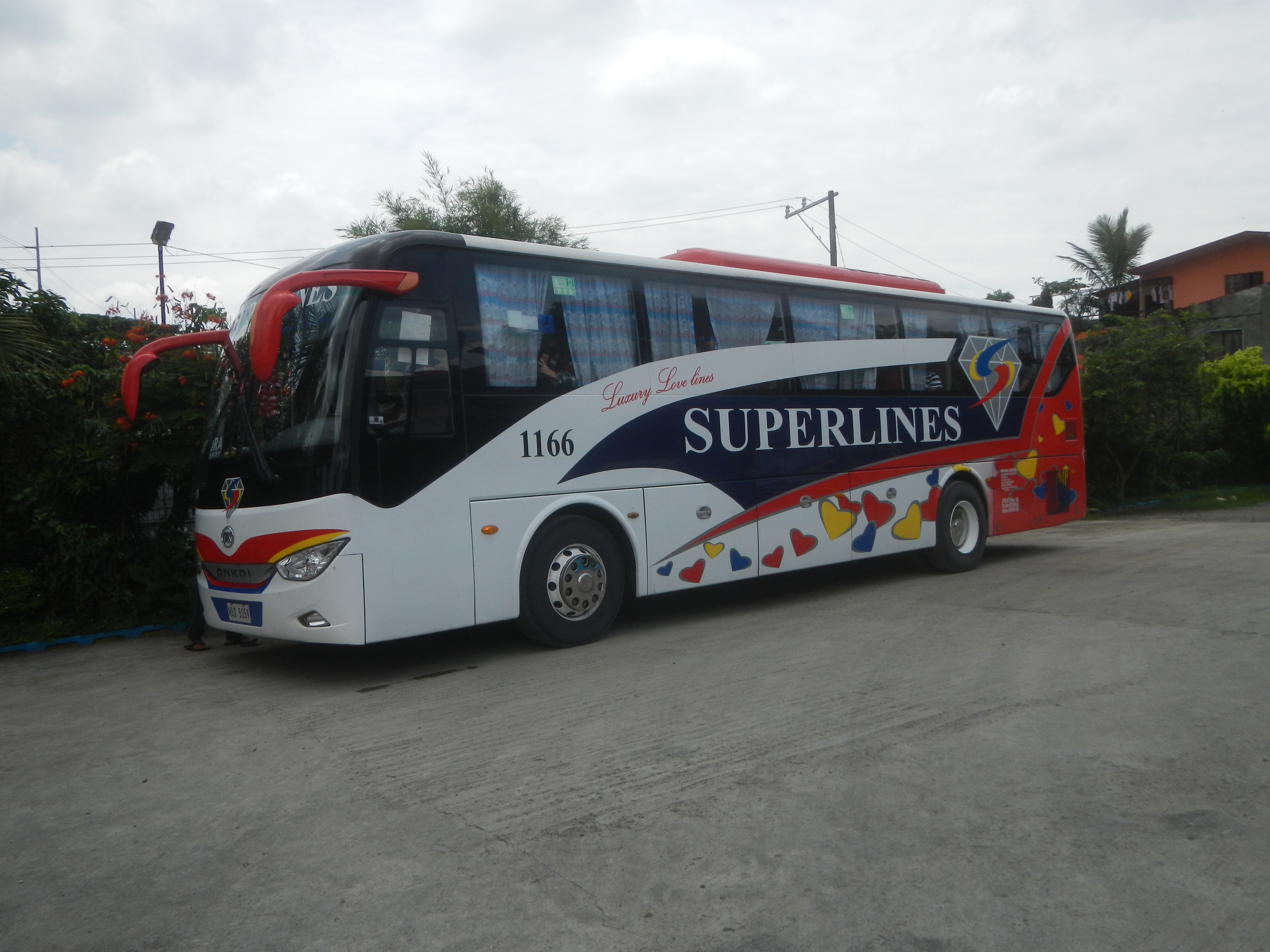
A Superlines bus parked at Turbina.

Buses also serve fuel stops in Turbina, as a way to refuel from long-distance routes. Bus stops are also common.

Jeepneys

Jeepneys and Modern PUVs are also a common transportation in Turbina, and are available from passing the area, a stop, or near the gas station. Jeepneys from this area serves local routes such as Alabang, Balibago, Batangas, Calamba Crossing, etc.

Vans

Van services can be found near stops, gas stations, or passing through the area. Van services are operated by local services.
