= Calamba Premiere International Park =

Industrial Park in Laguna, Philippines

- Industrial Park
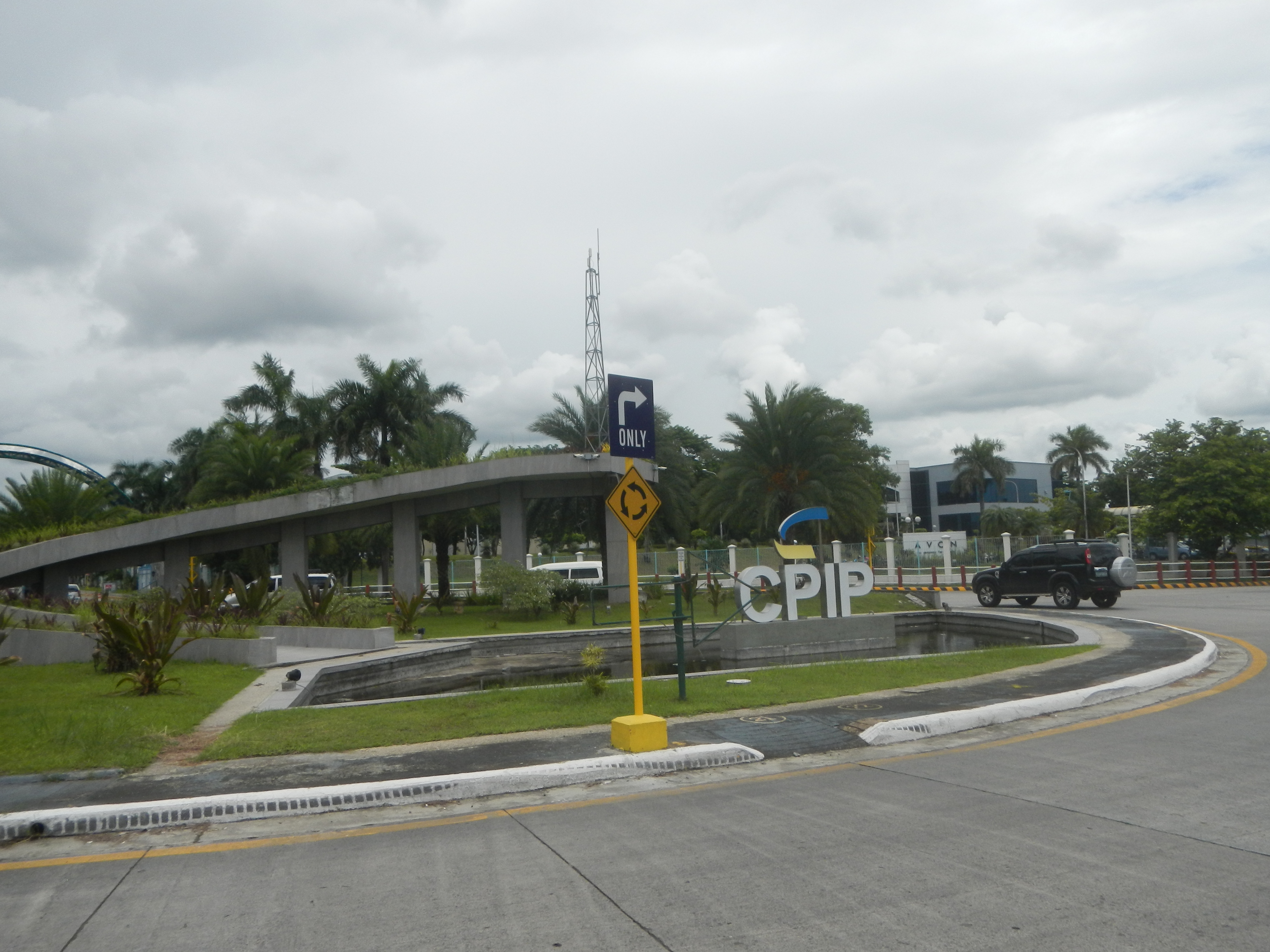
- Calamba Premiere International Park in July 2019
- Interactive map of Calamba Premiere International Park
- Coordinates: 14°11′50″N 121°08′00″E
- Country: Philippines
- Region: Calabarzon (Region IV-A)
- Province: Laguna
- City: Calamba
- Barangay: Batino, Barandal and Prinza

The Calamba Premiere International Park (CPIP) operated by the legal entity Calamba Premiere Realty Corporation as established in 1999, is one of the first industrial parks in the Philippines. It is a comprehensively-planned industrial estate located at Batino, Barandal, and Prinza in Calamba, Laguna and provides a workplace for technology-based, light and medium industries.

== Industrial Park Locators ==
One of the most important of the industrial parks in the Philippines, with four in this region of Calabarzon in Laguna: Calamba Premiere International Park or CPIP (formerly known as Calamba Premiere Industrial Park), Carmelray Industrial Park 1 in Canlubang, Carmelray Industrial Park 2 in Punta, and Light Industry and Science Park of the Philippines II in Real.

== Locators ==
Companies	Partnership companies
Avon Products Mfg; Inc.	(United States) USA
Calamba Shinei Industry Philippines, Inc.	Japan & Philippines
Microprecision Calibration Inc.	(United States) USA & Philippines
Cerelion, Inc.	Philippines
Frescano Food Int'l, Inc.	Philippines
L & K Industries Philippines, Inc.	Philippines
Lux Manufacturing, Inc.	Philippines
Pulse Integrated Technology Inc.	Philippines
Milo - Nestlé	Switzerland
Mold Parts Manufacturing Asia Inc.	South Korea
Nanax Philippines, Inc.	South Korea
Shin Heung Electro Digital, Inc.	Japan
Yeon Ho Philippines, Inc.	Japan
Sampo Molding and Assembly Industry Corp.	South Korea
Samsung Electro-Mechanics Philippines Corp.	South Korea
THN, Inc.	Taiwan
Trustful Inc.	Taiwan

== See also ==
- Light Industry and Science Park of the Philippines II
