= Rizal Monument (Calamba) =

Monument in Laguna, Philippines

José Rizal Monument in Calamba
- Bantayog ni José Rizal sa Calamba (Filipino)
- Interactive map of José Rizal Monument in Calamba
- Location: The Plaza, Calamba, Laguna, Philippines
- Coordinates: 14°11′45″N 121°09′35″E
- Designer: Jose Dionas "Jonas" F. Roces
- Type: Monument
- Material: Bronze, Granite
- Height: 43 feet (13 m) (total height)
- Beginning date: December 2010
- Completion date: April 2011
- Opening date: June 19, 2011
- Dedicated to: José Rizal

The Rizal Monument in Calamba is a monument built to commemorate the sesquicentennial (150th) birth anniversary of Dr. José Rizal, the Philippines' unofficial national hero and the greatest son of Calamba. It is a 6.7 metres (22 ft) statue sculpted by Jonas Roces and is located at The Plaza, a 6.7-hectare (17-acre) park in front of the Calamba City Hall Complex along Bacnotan Road in the barangay of Real. President Benigno Aquino III led the unveiling of the monument on June 19, 2011. The monument was cited as the tallest Rizal monument in the world before former Laguna Governor Jeorge 'E.R.' Ejercito Estregan inaugurated a 26 feet bronze Rizal Monument sculpted by Jonas Roces in Santa Cruz, Laguna, for the 2014 Palarong Pambansa hosted by the province.

== History ==
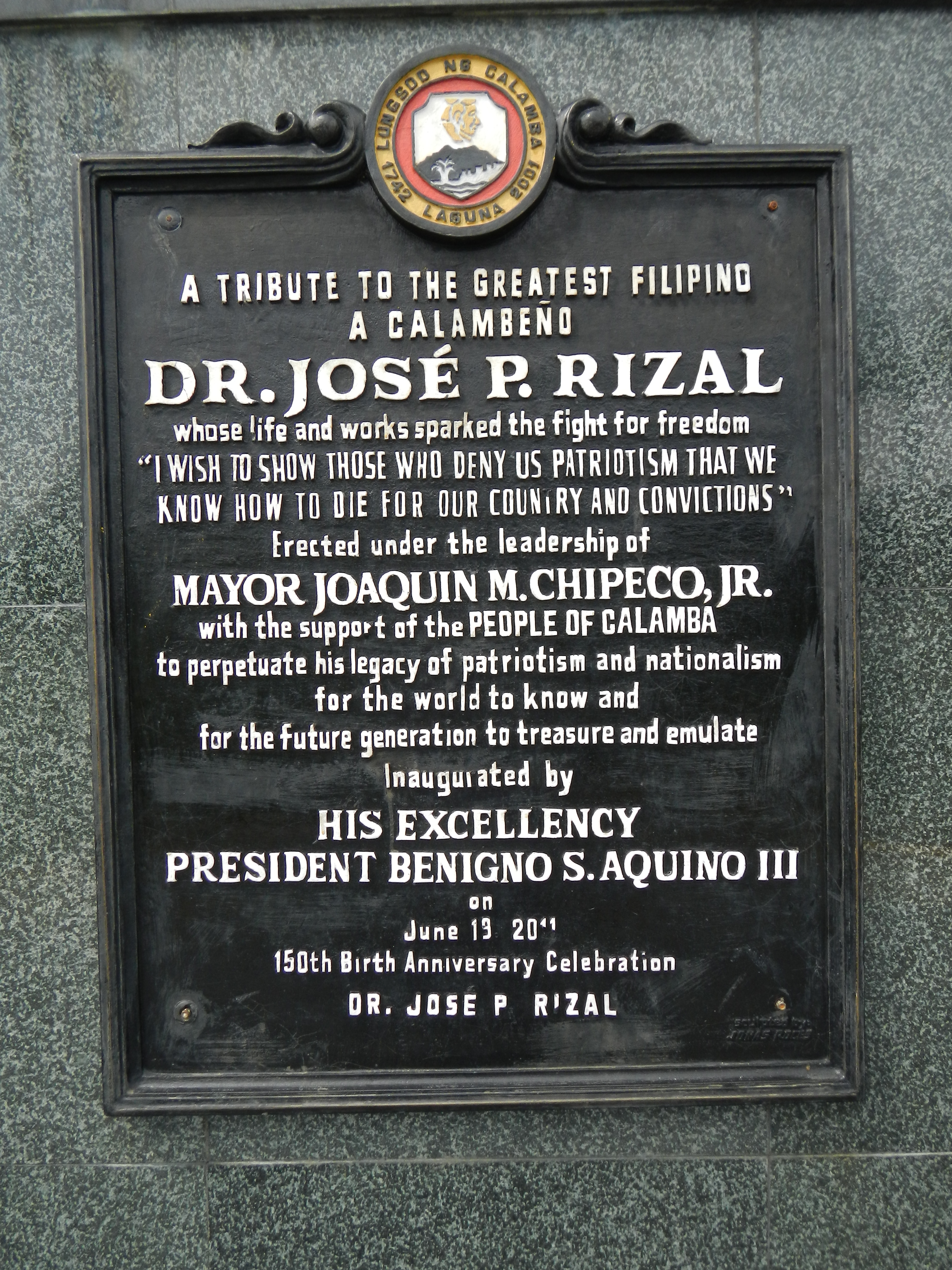
Marker installed by the City Government of Calamba

The City Government of Calamba, through the leadership of then Mayor Joaquin Chipeco started the idea of building the tallest Rizal monument as a gift of the people of Calamba as a tribute to its greatest son. He realized that it is proper and fitting to have the tallest monument in honor of Rizal in his hometown. Together with the local government unit of Calamba, the Philippine Amusement and Gaming Corporation (PAGCOR) initially funded the construction of the Rizal Monument. A young sculptor Jonas F. Roces from Marikina was commissioned to build the Rizal monument in December 2010. The original plan was to build a 16.4 feet monument. However, then Mayor Chipeco learned that the monument being sculpted is behind the current tallest Rizal monument in Nueva Vizcaya built by a Jordanian national. Three months before the official unveiling, the Rizal@150 Executive Committee increased the height of the monument to 22 feet. It was officially unveiled by President Benigno Aquino III on June 19, 2011, on the sesquicentennial birth anniversary of Rizal. It consists of two markers from the National Historical Commission of the Philippines and from the City Government of Calamba.

== Symbolisms ==
The statue depicts Rizal holding a book in his right hand and is made of bronze. It stands 22 feet (6.7 meters) which symbolizes the 22 languages and dialects Rizal mastered during his time such as Spanish, English, German, Japanese, Chinese and others. It is placed on top of a 2.8-metre (9 ft 2 in) podium consisting of a 15-step stairway which symbolizes one decade since Rizal was born in 1861. It also has a granite pedestal of 7.87 feet (2.40 m) and a 13.12 feet (4.00 m) circular stairway base. The monument's total height is 43 feet (13 m) (equivalent to a four-storey building) and its weight is 2 tons.

== Management ==
The Rizal Monument and Plaza is managed by the local government unit of Calamba.

== See also ==
- José Rizal
- Rizal Monument
- First José Rizal Monument (Daet)
