= Light Industry and Science Park =

Series of industrial parks in the Philippines

Coordinates: 14°08′10″N 121°09′10″E

Light Industry and Science Park (LISP) is the name of a series of industrial parks in the Philippines owned and developed by Science Park of the Philippines. It has six locations, namely: LISP I in Cabuyao, Laguna, LISP II in Calamba, Laguna, LISP III in Santo Tomas, Batangas, LISP IV in Malvar, Batangas, Cebu Light Industrial Park (CLIP) in Lapu-Lapu City, and Hermosa Ecozone Industrial Park (HEIP) in Hermosa, Bataan.

LISP II, which is located in Barangay Real, Calamba, Laguna, sold out after two years. It has an area of 68 ha (170 acres) and is home to 24 locators which employ more than 10,000 people. LISP II is 6.3 kilometers (3.9 mi) from LISP-I, located in Barangay Diezmo, Cabuyao in Laguna, Philippines.

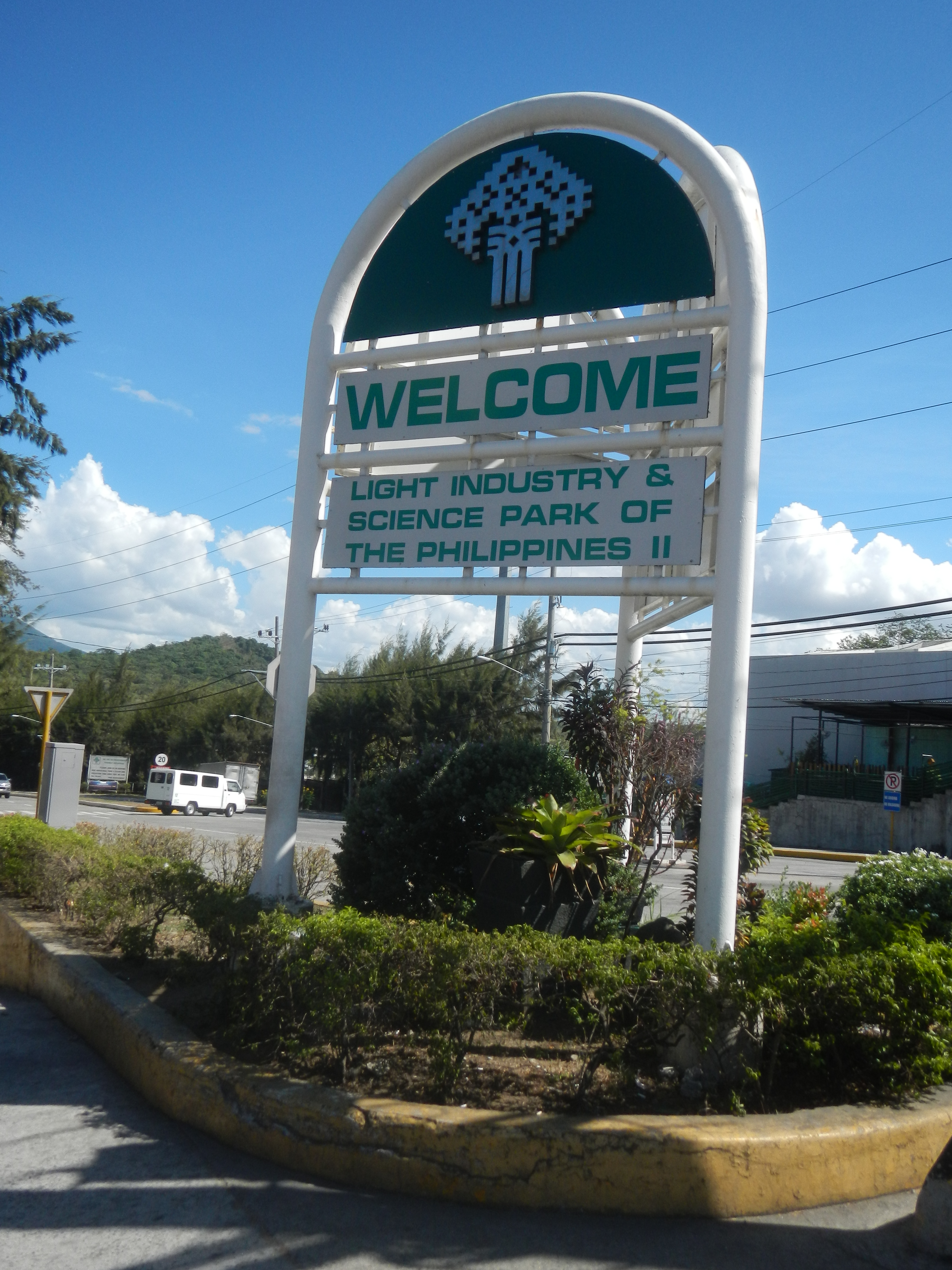
LISP II, Calamba

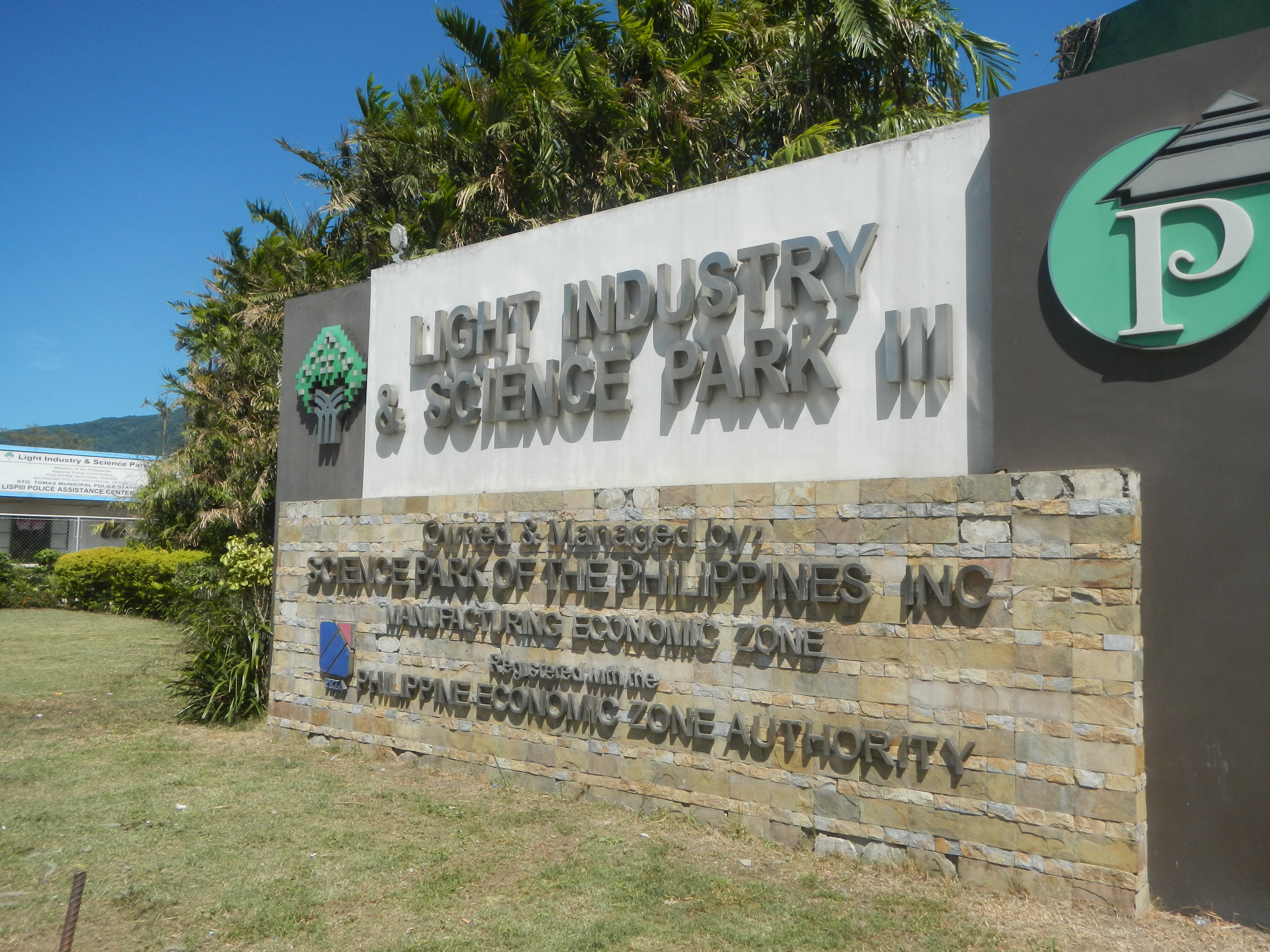
LISP III, Santo Tomas

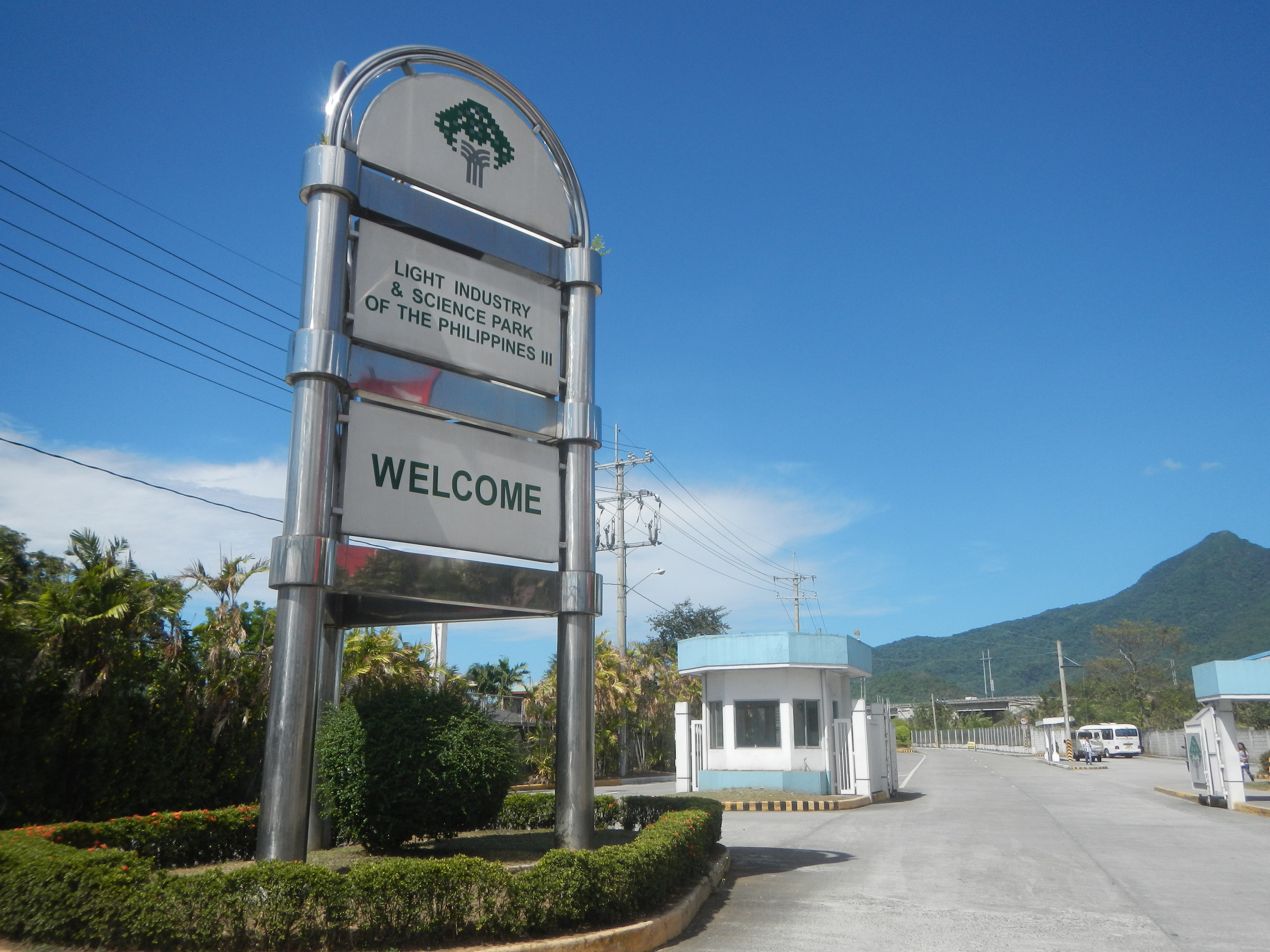
LISP III, Santo Tomas
