= Calamba Bayside National High School =

Public high school in Laguna, Philippines

Coordinates: 14°12′56″N 121°11′10″E

The Calamba Bayside National High School is located in Calamba, Laguna, Philippines. It was established in 1989 as the Lingga Rural High School.
