= Real, Calamba =

Real
- Barangay
- Barangay Real
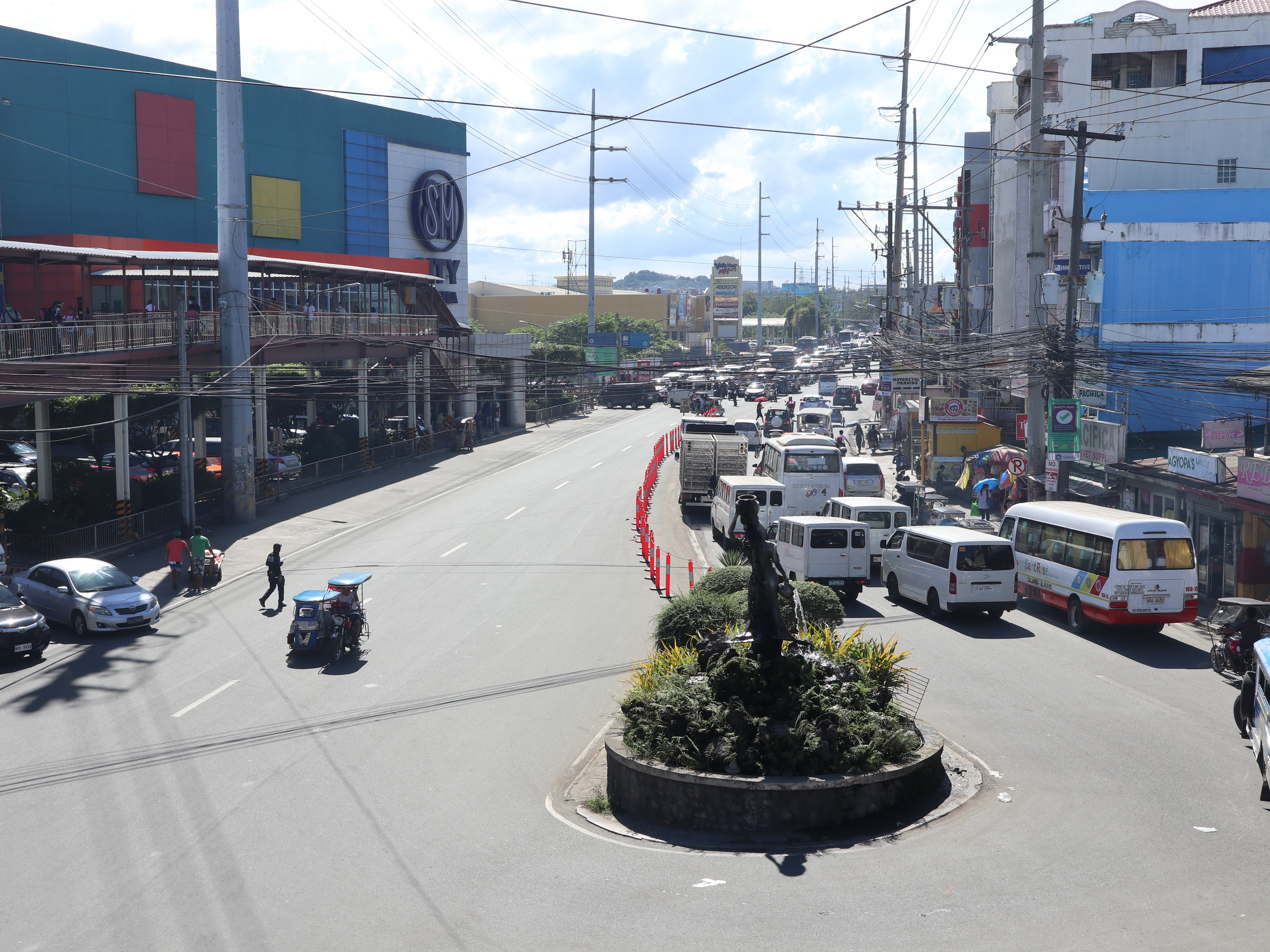
- National Highway (Real Road) near Calamba Crossing
- Coordinates: 14°11′49″N 121°9′2″E
- Country: Philippines
- Islands: Luzon
- Region: Calabarzon (Region–IV-A)
- Province: Laguna
- City: Calamba

Government
  - Chairman: Florencio A. Morales Jr.
  - Councilors: Kimberly P. Marquez; Aris V. Leyva; Roderick G. Catindig; Neilson C. Aviles; Macario H. Marasigan; Sherlyn M. Lactao; Eulogio E. Morales

Area
  - Land: 1.329 km^{2} (0.513 sq mi)

Population (2024)
  - Total: 18,607
  - Density: 14,000/km^{2} (36,260/sq mi)

Real is a barangay in the city of Calamba. It is also where the new Calamba City Hall and the Rizal Monument are located.

== Industrial Park ==
This barangay is one of the most important in the city like some barangays in Calamba are; Canlubang, Batino and Milagrosa. The barangay is a known location of Light Industry and Science Park of the Philippines II, an industrial park in the city.

== Neighboring Barangays ==
Directions	Barangays
West	Turbina
East	Barangay 1, Lecheria & Halang
South	La Mesa
North	Lawa, Parian

== Population ==
Population census of Brgy. Real
Year	Pop.	±% p.a.
1980	5,463	—
1990	7,409	+3.09%
1995	9,645	+5.07%
2000	11,019	+2.90%
2007	13,375	+2.71%
2010	13,805	+1.16%
2015	14,356	+0.75%
2020	16,371	+2.80%
2024	18,607	+3.12%

== Notable spots ==
- 268 Shopping Mall (Real Road)
- Calamba Terminal via (Canlubang)
- Calamba City Hall
- Meralco Calamba Branch
- Rizal Monument
- Saint Benilde International School (Main)
- SM City Calamba
- Walter Mart Calamba

== See also ==
- Calamba Premiere International Park

== Notable people ==
- Jeric Gonzales, actor and one of the grand winners on Protégé
- Thea Tolentino, actress and one of the grand winners on Protégé

== Gallery ==
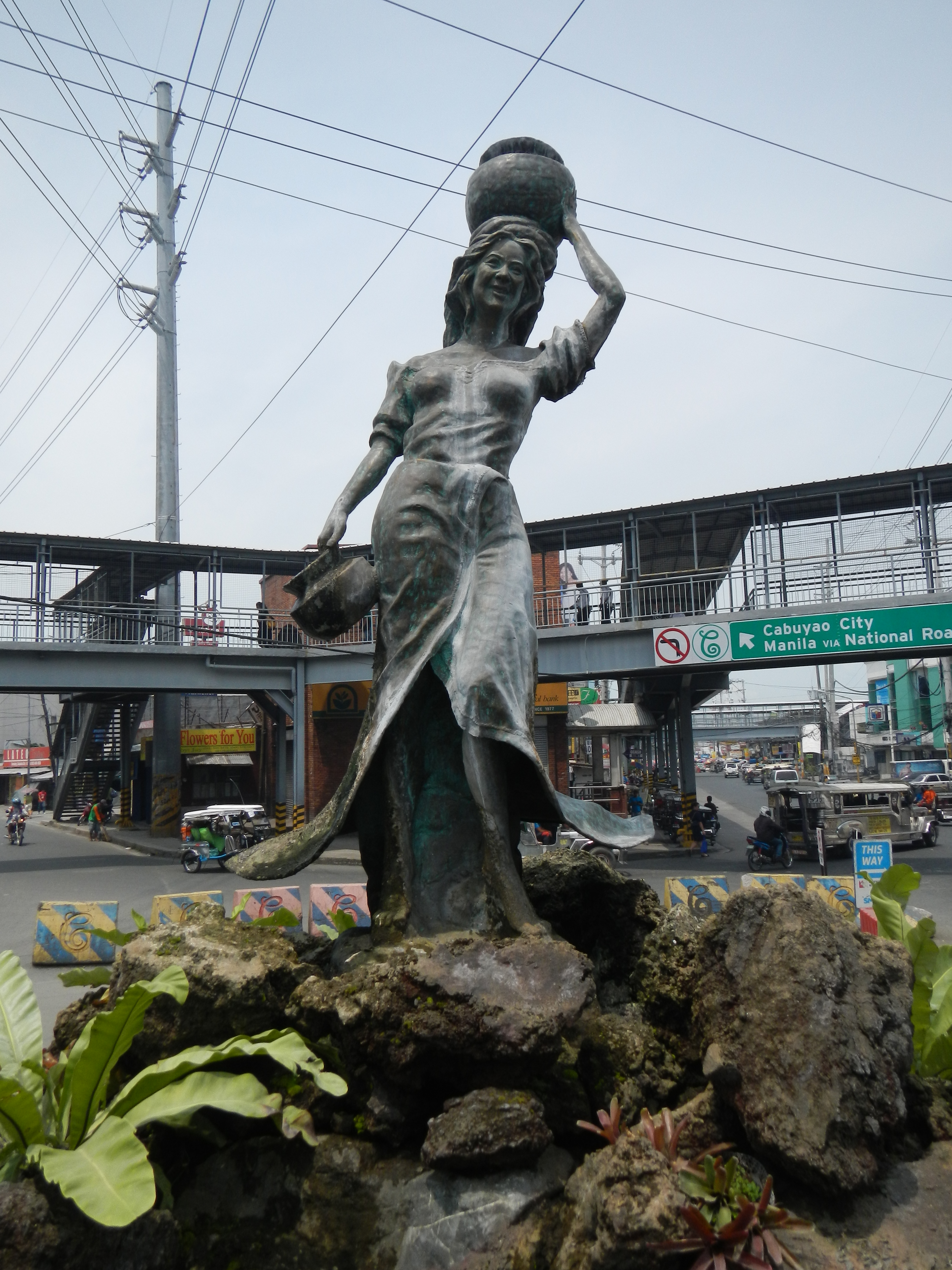
A Virgo Monument at Triangle Road

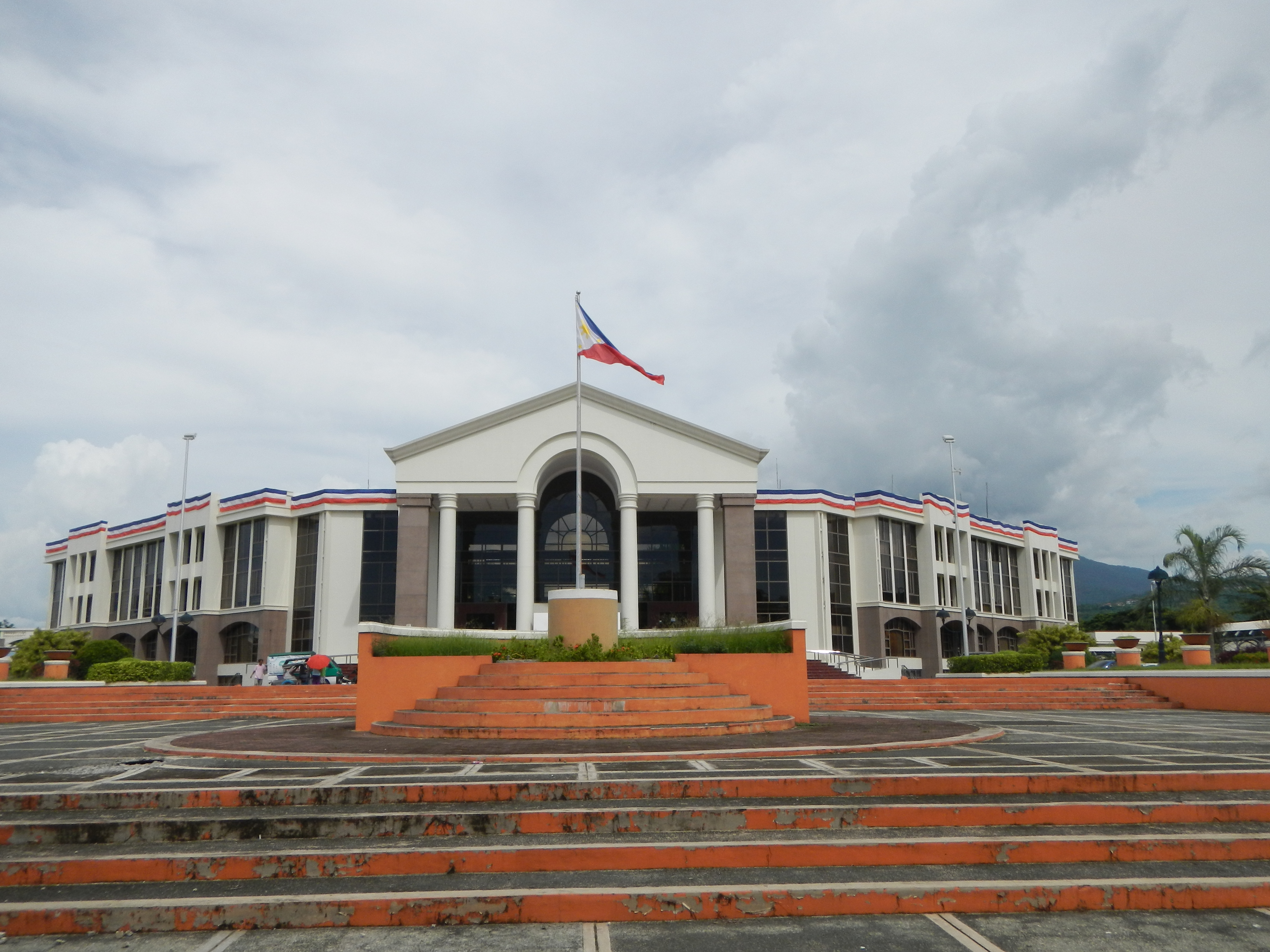
Calamba City Hall

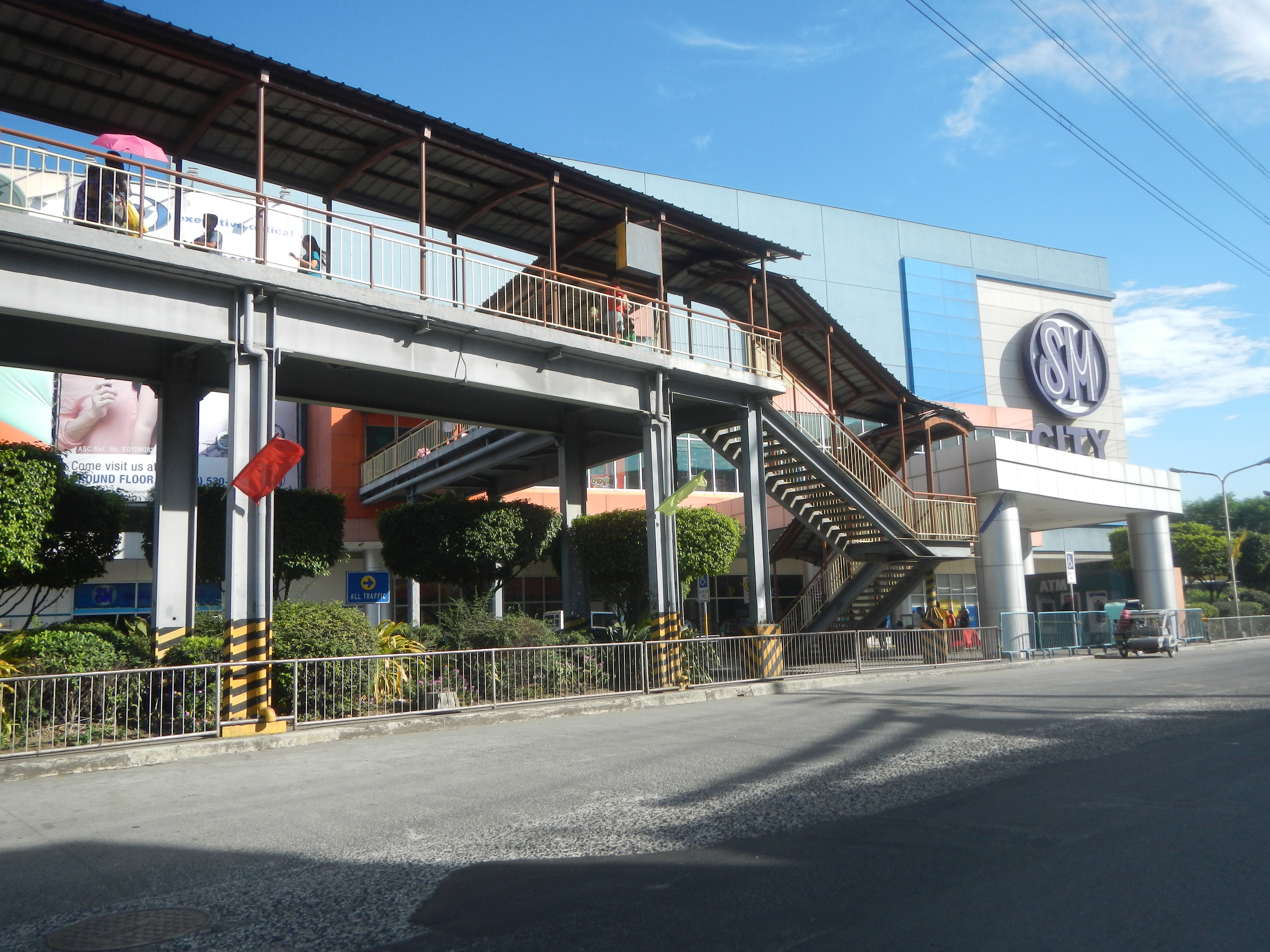
SM City Calamba

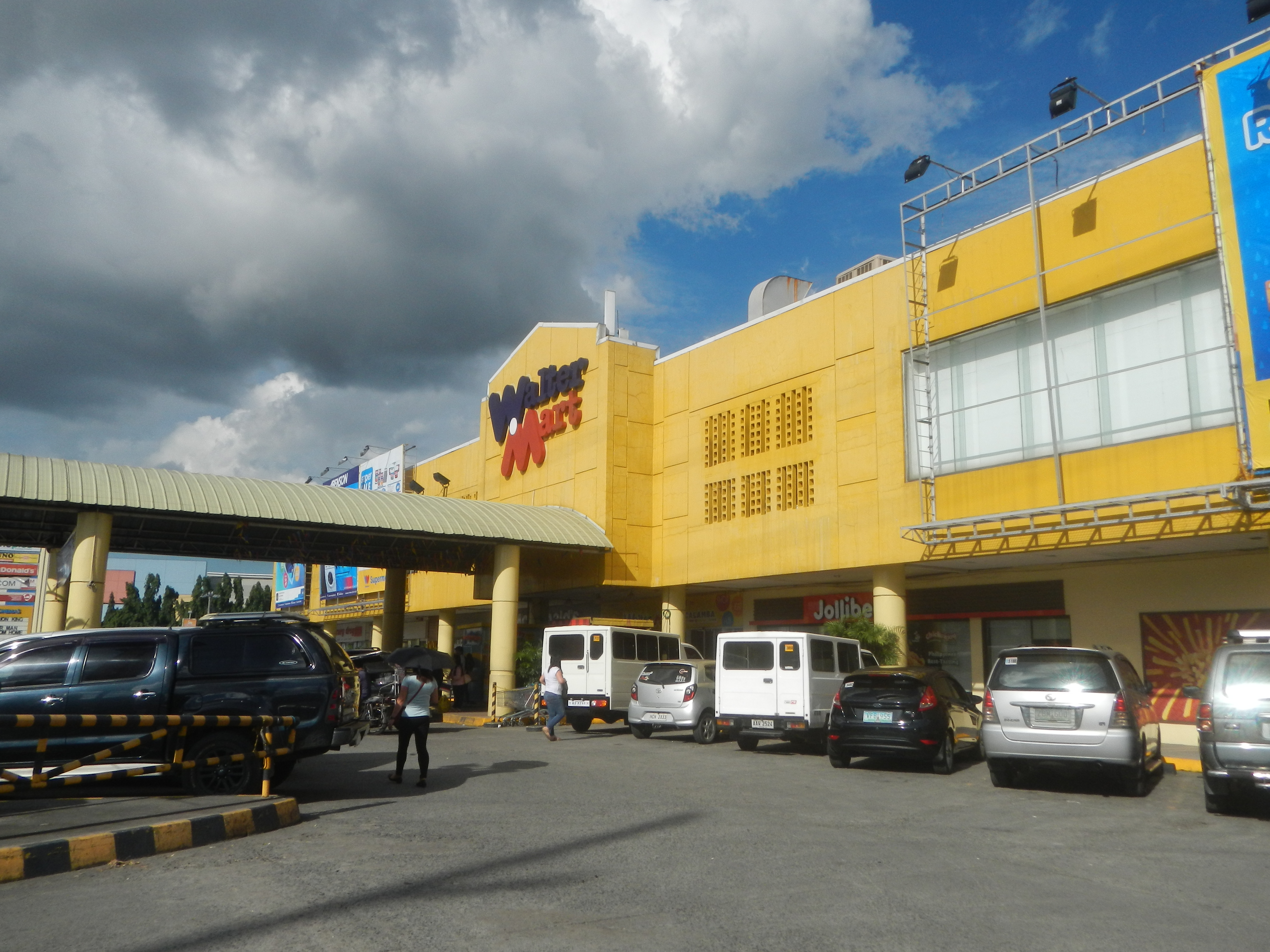
Walter Mart Calamba
