= Calamba Claypot =

Landmark in Laguna, Philippines

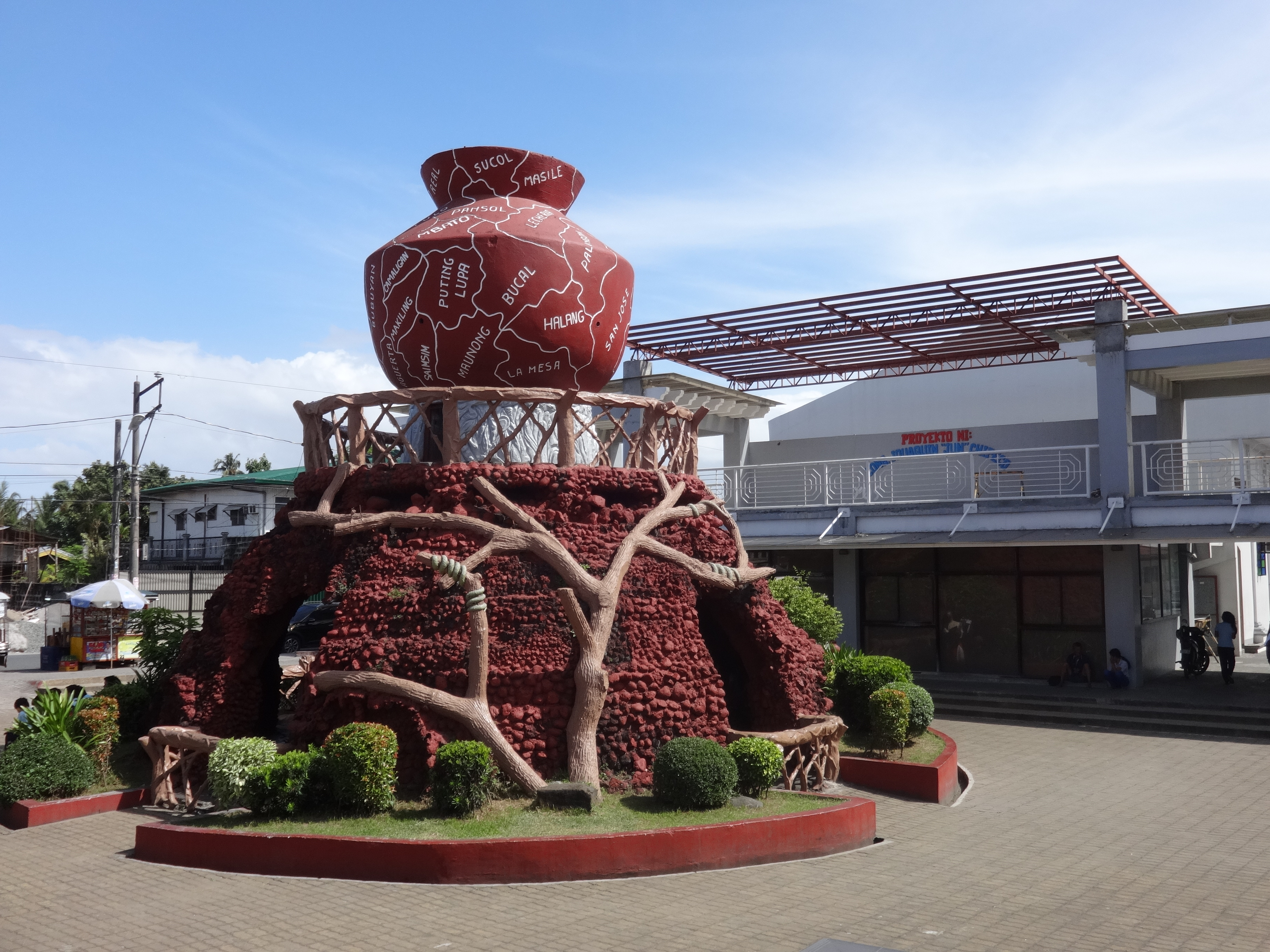
- Interactive map of Calamba Claypot
- Location: City Plaza, Poblacion 5, Calamba, Laguna, Philippines
- Coordinates: 14°12′51″N 121°10′01″E
- Beginning date: 1937
- Completion date: 1939

The Calamba Claypot, also known as the Calamba Jar and the Banga, is a landmark in Calamba, Laguna, Philippines, considered the largest claypot in the world. It is located at the City Plaza near Calamba Church and Rizal Shrine. Built in 1937, it was constructed to reference the origin of the town's name (kalamba, meaning "water jar") with names of the cities and villages inscribed on its exterior. The giant claypot can also be found in the city's official seal.

The plaza was proposed by the then-town councillor, Agapito Alzona, to utilize the area where the old town market once stood. The resolution was approved by the then-town mayor, Roman Lazaro. The giant claypot was designed and created by the sculptor Felipe Samaniego, a University of the Philippines graduate trained under the famed National Artist for Visual Arts Guillermo Tolentino. Construction of the monument began in 1937 and completed in 1939.
